= Japanese philosophy =

Fusion of ideologies

Japanese philosophy has historically been a fusion of both indigenous Shinto and continental Asian religions, such as Buddhism, Taoism and Confucianism. Japanese philosophy has been heavily influenced by both Chinese philosophy and Indian philosophy, as with Mitogaku and Zen. Modern Japanese philosophy is in addition influenced by Western philosophy.

== Ancient and medieval thought ==
Before feudalism was firmly established in Japan, Buddhism occupied the mainstream of Japanese thought. The Buddhist culture introduced politically by Prince Shōtoku was completed as the "making a country safe" thought in the Nara period. When the Heian period (794–1185) began, in substitution for the "making a country safe" thought, a form of esoteric Buddhism collectively known as mikkyō became widespread. However, in the late noble era when pessimism was popular due to the "belief that Buddhism will decline during the latter days of this world", the Pure Land movements spread out encouraging anticipation of a "future life" as a means to cope with desperation over "life in this world". During the Kamakura period (1185–1333) when government dominated by the samurai class began, a “new” Buddhism for the newly-risen class (samurai) appears.

=== Arrival of Buddhism and early influence in Japan ===
In ancient Japan, the arrival of Buddhism closely relates to the national construction and the national centralization of power. Prince Shōtoku and the Soga family fought and overcame the Mononobe family, who had handled the ancient Japanese religion, and elaborated a plan for national governance based on the unification of the legal codes system and Buddhism. While cooperating with the Soga family, Prince Shōtoku, who was the regent of the Empress Suiko, showed a deep understanding in "foreign" Buddhism, and planned to stabilize national politics through the use of Buddhism. The thought that national peace and security came through the power of Buddhism is called the "making a country safe" thought. In the Nara period, in particular the times of Emperor Shōmu, the Kokubun-ji temples and Kokubun-ni-ji temples were erected throughout the whole country and Tōdai-ji Temple and the Daibutsu were erected in Nara. The Buddhist policy of the state reached its apex during the Nara period, as evidenced by Jianzhen of the Tang dynasty bringing an imperial ordination platform to Todai-ji Temple,

While Nara Buddhism followed only the "making a country safe" thought, Heian Buddhism brought not only national peace and security but also the personal worldly profit. Because practitioners of Heian Buddhism frequently performed severe ascetic practices, incantations and prayers in the mountains; this Buddhism came to be called mikkyō. Kūkai, a Buddhist monk, learned Chinese esoteric Buddhism while on a diplomatic mission to the Chinese court, and combined Japanese Buddhism with Chinese esoteric Buddhist practices to form Japanese Shingon Buddhism. Saichō, a Buddhist monk who also journeyed to China, learned the practices of the Chinese Tendai sect and argued that the teachings of the Lotus Sutra should be the core of Japanese Buddhism.

By the late Heian era, the earthly focus of Heian Buddhism led Buddhist monks to declare a "sinful age" wherein the possibility of relief in this world was denied and therefore a trend of looking for reincarnation to the Buddhists' paradise after death arose. Additionally, the new thought that "Buddhism will decline during the latter days of this world" led to the rise of the Pure Land movement. This movement, spearheaded by Kūya, a follower of Pure Land Buddhism, preached faith to the Amitābha and taught that all people could reach the Buddhist paradise, not just Buddhist monks.

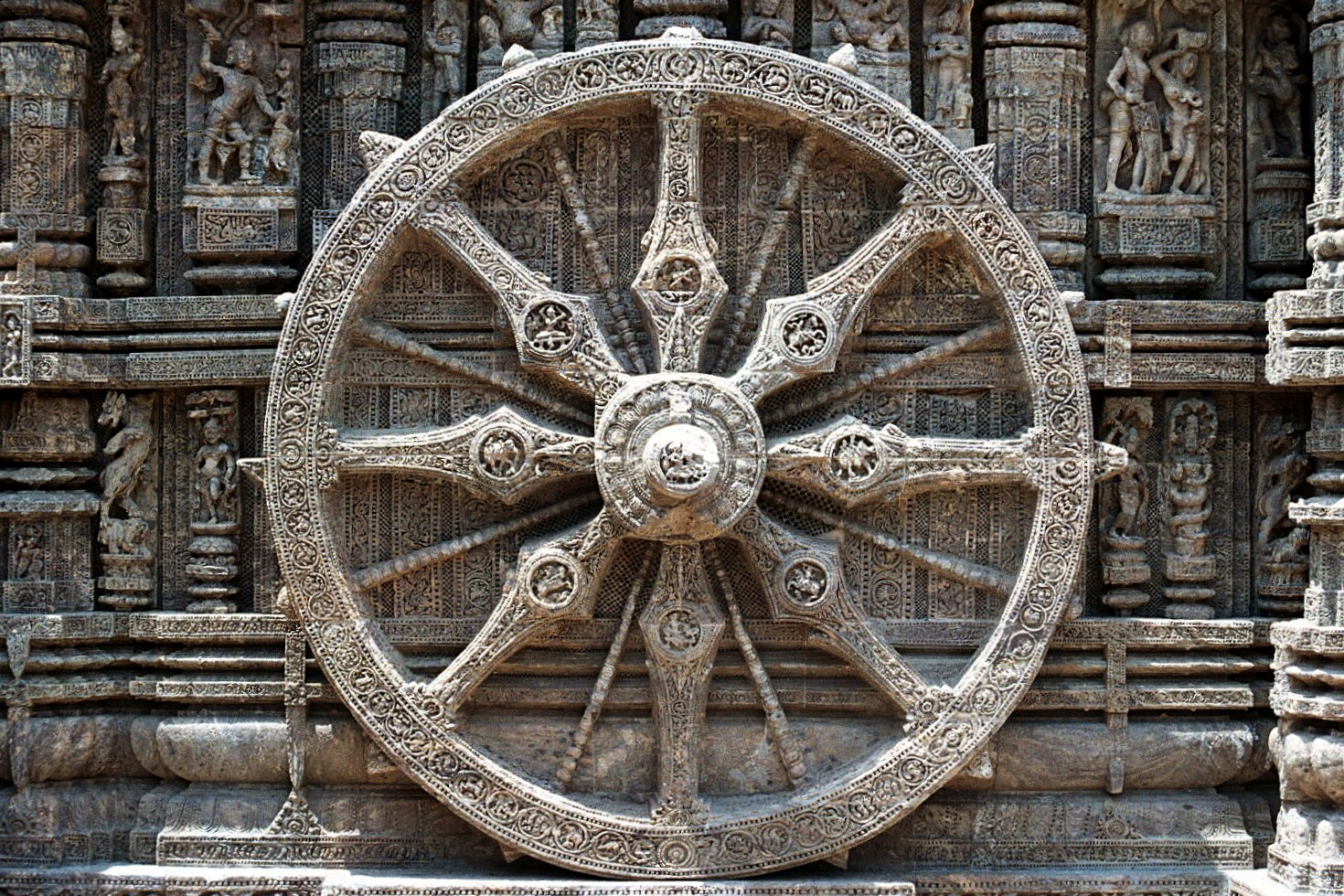
Dharmāchakrā (Buddhist Wheel) Category:Buddhist symbols

=== Kamakura Buddhism ===
The Jōdo faith, which affected by the Jodo sect of the late Heian period, relies on salvation through the benevolence of Amitābha, and is going to be relieved by its power. Hōnen, who initiated the Jodo sect of Buddhism, abandoned other ascetic practices entirely. He preached his pupils to believe in Amitabha and to earnestly pray "namu-amida-butsu", and so they would go to the paradise. His pupil, Shinran who initiated Pure Land Buddhism, thoroughly carried out Honen's teaching and preached the absolute dependence. In addition, Shinran advocated that an object of the relief of the Amitabha was a criminal who was aware of a worldly and desirous criminal oneself. Ippen, who initiated the Jishu sect, began "the chanting religious dance".

As contrast with dependent Jōdō faith, Zen Buddhism attempts to be spiritually self-awakened by Zen meditation. Eisai learned the Rinzai sect in China. He gave pupils a difficult problem and he made them solve it, and so they would be enlightened by themselves. Rinzai Zen was supported widely by the upper samurai class in the Kamakura period. Dōgen learned the Sōtō sect in China. Oppose to Eisai, he preached enlightenment by earnest sitting meditation (zazen). Soto Zen was supported by the local samurais.

Most schools of Nichiren Buddhism (Japanese: 法華系仏教 Hokke-kei Bukkyō) refer to the priest and teacher Nichiren as their founding father. In his teachings he underlined the, to his mind, supremacy of the Lotus Sutra. He advocated the attainment of Buddhahood during one's lifetime and regarded his interpretation of the Buddhist teachings as the correct form of practice for the Latter Day of the Law mappō. One of his major treatises is the "Rissho Ankoku Ron" (On Establishing the Correct teaching for the Peace of the Land). The chanting of the Mantra "Namu Myōhō Renge Kyō" is to this day the central practice to almost all Nichiren Buddhist schools and organisations.

== Early modern thought ==
Whereas the ancient and medieval thought of Japan was tied closely to Buddhism, the early modern thought of Japan was mainly Confucianism or Neo-Confucianism, which was designated for official study by the Tokugawa shogunate. In addition, rational Confucianism stimulated Kokugaku, Rangaku and the non-official popular thought after the middle Edo period.

=== Confucianism ===
In the Edo period, Confucianism was the authorised study. Various schools of neo-Confucianism were popular.

The Zhu Xi school of neo-Confucianism respected family-like feudal order which upheld fixed social positions. Hayashi Razan assumed the Zhu Xi school of neo-Confucianism to be the theoretical basics of the Tokugawa shogunate. Through the principle of civilian government, Yushima Seidō dedicating to Confucius was established. By the Kansei Reforms, the Zhu Xi school of neo-Confucianism were still more strengthened and authorized by the Tokugawa shogunate. In addition, the thought of a school of the Zhu Xi school of neo-Confucianism gave big influence to the political movement advocating reverence for the Emperor and the expulsion of foreigners of the late Tokugawa era.

In contrast with the Zhu Xi school of neo-Confucianism, the Wang Yangming school of neo-Confucianism respecting practical ethics was consistently monitored and oppressed by the Tokugawa shogunate because of its criticisms against the socio-political conditions under the Tokugawa shogunate.

The third schools of neo-Confucianism took consideration into the real intentions of original texts by Confucius and Mencius. Yamaga Sokō established his philosophy on Confucian ethics, and assumed the samurai to be the highest class. Itō Jinsai paid attention to "ren" of Confucius and he respected "ren" as the love for another person and "truth" as pure consideration. In addition, deriving from his substantial studies of ancient Chinese classics, Ogyū Sorai insisted that the original Confucian spirit is to rule the world and to save a citizen.

=== Kokugaku and Rangaku ===
In the middle of the Edo period, Kokugaku, the study of ancient Japanese thought and culture, became popular against foreign ideas such as Buddhism or Confucianism. By the Sakoku policy of the Tokugawa shogunate, Edo intellectuals could not have any positive contact with Western civilization, and so Rangaku, Dutch learning, was the only window to the West.

In the middle days of the Edo period, Kokugaku became popular while being influenced by positivist Confucianism with nationalism as a background. Kokugaku positively studied ancient Japanese thought and culture, including "Kojiki", "Nihon Shoki" and "Man'yōshū", and they aimed at excavating original moral culture of Japan which was different from Confucianism and Buddhism. Kamo no Mabuchi wrestled with the study of "Manyoshu" and called "masurao-buri" for masculine and tolerant style, and he evaluated the collection as pure and simple. Through his study of the Kojiki, Motoori Norinaga argued that the essence of the Japanese literature came from "mono no aware" which were natural feelings to occur when you contacted an object. He respected Japanese "Yamato spirit" instead of Chinese (Confucianism / Buddhism) "Kara spirit". According to him, Kokugaku should pursue the Japanese old way of "Shinto". Through his study of Kokugaku, Hirata Atsutane advocated nationalistic State Shinto, the obedience to the Emperor and abolition of Confucianism and Buddhism. It was a driving force to the end of the Tokugawa shogunate and the Meiji Restoration.

In the Sakoku period of the Edo period, there was no direct contact with the West, but Rangaku became popular by encouraging importation of Western books translated in Chinese from China during the Kyōhō Reforms. Maeno Ryotaku and Sugita Genpaku translated the Dutch "Tafel Anatomie" into Japanese. Dutch learning unfolded to other Western studies such as British, French and American studies by the late Tokugawa era. The manner of "Japanese spirit, Western civilisation" was completed by Sakuma Shōzan’s straightforward expression, "Eastern ethics and Western technology". Because Takano Chōei and Watanabe Kazan criticized Sakoku strictly, they were oppressed by the Tokugawa shogunate.

=== Popular thought ===
In the Edo period, private schools were opened by samurais, merchants and scholars who played an active part. Their thoughts were criticisms for the dominant feudal order.

Ishida Baigan synthesized Confucianism, Buddhism and Shinto, and established practical philosophy for the masses. He recommended working hard at commerce as the effect of honesty and thrift. Ando Shoeki called nature's world the ideal society where all human beings engaged in farming and they lived self-sufficiently without artificiality. He criticized a lawful society where there was feudal class discrimination and the difference between the rich and poor. Ninomiya Sontoku insisted that people must repay the virtues, which supported their existence, with their own virtue.

== Late Modern thought ==
While the early modern Japanese thought developed in Confucianism and Buddhism, English Enlightenment and French human rights were prevalent after the Meiji Restoration had become rapidly affected by Western thought. From the time of Sino- and Russo-Japanese Wars, Japanese capitalism highly developed. Christianity and socialism also developed and became tied to various social movements. In addition, nationalistic thought and study were formed while being opposed to foreign study.

=== The Enlightenment and people's rights ===
In the Meiji Restoration, English and French civil society was introduced, in particular, utilitarianism and social Darwinism from England, and popular sovereignty of Jean-Jacques Rousseau from France.

The thinkers of the early Meiji period advocated the British Enlightenment values derived from Western civil society. They attempted to criticise Japanese traditional authority and feudalism. However they were finally in harmony with the government and accepted the modernization from the above without the radicalness. In 1873, Mori Arinori formed Meirokusha. The people who gathered in this cultural association had much in common with points such as regarding practical learning as important, catching human characteristics practically and assuming the form of government that accepted the conditions of a country an ideal. Mori Arinori promoted national education as Minister of Education. Nishi Amane affirmed a human behaviour based on interest. Katō Hiroyuki threw away natural rights under influence of social Darwinism, and instead advocated the survival of the fittest.

Fukuzawa Yukichi, who introduced British utilitarianism to Japan and advocated natural rights, assumed that human rights were given by Heaven. He considered the development of the civilization to be the development of the human spirit, and it was assumed that one's independence led to independence of one country. Fukuzawa thought that government is for the "sake of convenience", and its appearance should be suitable to the culture. He said that there is no single ideal form of government. In addition, he insisted that Japan should have gone into the continent externally against the Great Powers.

While members of Meirokusha finally advocated harmonization of the government and people, democratic thinkers absorbed radical people's rights from France and they supported national resistance and revolution verbally against the Meiji oligarchy after the Satsuma Rebellion. In 1874, Itagaki Taisuke introduced the establishment of the elected legislature. It spread nationwide as the Freedom and People's Rights Movement. Ueki Emori helped Itagaki and he drew up a radical draft. Strongly influenced by Rousseau, Nakae Chōmin argued for people's sovereignty and individual freedom. However, concerning the Japanese situation, he pointed out the importance of parliamentary monarchy. According to him, the Imperial Constitution should be gradually revised by the Diet.

From the late period of Meiji to the Taishō era, a democratic trend spread as a background of bourgeois political consciousness. Its current led to political movements for safeguarding the Constitution and for the popular election. Yoshino Sakuzō argued for party cabinet politics and popular election. He did not deeply pursue who was the sovereign but he insisted the political goal aim for people's happiness and political decisions aim for people's intentions. Minobe Tatsukichi interpreted a sovereign as not an emperor but the state. According to him, an emperor only excises his power as the highest organ under the Meiji Constitution. Although his theory was widely acknowledged at first, he was politically suppressed by the military and the rightists afterwards.

In 1911, Hiratsuka Raichō formed Seitosha. She asked for awakening of women's own right and development of feminist movement. While Yosano Akiko denied gender differences, Raicho emphasised motherhood raising a child and she acknowledged the official aids for women to demonstrate their feminine ability. In 1920, Raicho formed a new association for women with Ichikawa Fusae and Oku Mumeo. Soon after their activities were successful in getting women's participating at political addresses, the association fell apart due an internal schism. Later, Ichikawa formed a new one and continued a movement for female suffrage.

=== Christianity and socialism ===
It was Christians and socialists who struggled with social contradictions derived from Japanese modernity. Christian social movements were active after the Sino- and Russo-Japanese Wars, which brought capitalism and its contradiction to Japanese society. Many Japanese socialists were influenced by Christian humanism, and in that point they were deeply associated with Christianity.

Christianity, banned by the Tokugawa shogunate, influenced many Meiji intellectuals. Uchimura Kanzō developed "two Js" to unite Bushido and Christian spirit. He believed that his calling was to serve "Japan" and "Jesus". He argued for the nonchurch movement. He challenged the Imperial Rescript on Education and spoke against the Russo-Japanese War. Nitobe Inazō was a Quaker and attempted to unite Japanese culture and Christianity. He introduced Japanese culture abroad and he became secretary-general of the League of Nations. Joseph Hardy Neesima studied theology abroad in the United States. He established Doshisha University at Kyoto and he was engaged in Christian character building.

About the time of Sino- and Russo-Japanese wars, Japan succeeded in capitalization through the Industrial Revolution as soon as socialism spread against capitalism. However, the social movements were suppressed by the security police law of 1900, and finally in the High Treason Incident of 1910 socialists were pressed by the military and the fascist government. Kawakami Hajime wrote articles about poverty in a newspaper. He emphasized personal remodeling to solve poverty at first, however, later he became a Marxist and he argued for social remodeling by social compulsion. Kōtoku Shūsui originally attempted to realize socialism through the Diet, however he became a unionist and he argued for a direct action by a general strike. He was executed as the mastermind of the high treason incident of 1910. Osugi Sakae argued for individual freedom using the principles of anarchism and unionism. He was seen as a threat by the government and was assassinated by military police in the disorder following the 1923 Great Kantō earthquake.

=== The development of Japanism ===
The Age of Enlightenment, Christianity and socialism have influenced Japanese thought since the Meiji Restoration. The emphasis on Japanese political culture and national tradition rose as a reaction against westernization. This trend has had an ideological side of legitimizing imperialism and militarism/fascism.

Tokutomi Sohō published a magazine in which he argued for liberal democracy and populism against Japanese westernization. However, he was disillusioned with the bourgeois who should play a political part in ... Kuga Katsunan regarded Japanese political culture and national tradition very highly. He aimed for restoration and enhancement of national emotion; however, he was not a narrow-minded nationalist. He criticized the military and argued for a parliamentary system of government and expansion of suffrage.

After the Meiji Restoration, Japanese government protected Shinto and treated it not as a special religion but as State Shinto. The government closely related Shinto with the holy emperor, and they used Shinto as a tool for their state governance. State Shinto was clearly distinguished from private sects of the Shinto religion. It was a model of ideological state governance to form State Shinto and to promulgate the Imperial Rescript on Education. Meiji statism attempted to restore national sovereignty and pursued imperialism and colonialism through the Sino- and Russo-Japanese Wars. However, its militaristic trend developed to ultra-nationalism. Kita Ikki advocated the exclusion of the zaibatsu, senior statesmen and political parties and the establishment of government for direct connection with the emperor and the people.

Yanagita Kunio was at the forefront of study of Japanese folklore. He named members of the general public who are not political leaders and intellectuals as “jomin”. Other folklorists are Minakata Kumagusu, Yanagi Muneyoshi and Orikuchi Shinobu.

In pre-war Japan, German philosophy was eagerly studied and introduced. However, from the late Meiji to Taishō period, Kyoto School attempted to harmonize Western thought with Eastern thought such as Zen Buddhism. Nishida Kitaro established an original thought by fusion of Zen and Western thought. His thought is called Nishida philosophy. He insisted on pure experience in which there is no opposition between subjectivity and objectivity. His ontology derived from absolute nothingness. Watsuji Tetsuro criticized Western selfish individualism. His ethics says human beings are not in an isolated existence but related existence. He insisted that individual and social beings should be aware of their own individuality and social membership. He is also well known as his Climate and Culture in which he studied the relationship between the natural environment and local lifestyle.

=== Contemporary Japanese philosophy ===
After World War II, many academic philosophers have published books on Continental philosophy and American philosophy. Among those, Ōmori Shōzō, Wataru Hiromatsu, Yasuo Yuasa and Takaaki Yoshimoto created original works under the influence of Marxism, phenomenology and analytic philosophy. Ōmori Shōzō created a unique monist epistemology based on his concepts of "representation monism", "double depiction", and "language animism". Wataru Hiromatsu developed his theory of "multi-subjective ontological structure of the world". Yasuo Yuasa advanced a new theory of the body influenced by Merleau-Ponty and the body image found in Chinese medicine. Takaaki Yoshimoto is famous for his "shared illusion theory" and various philosophical essays on Japanese culture. Today, such scholars as Kojin Karatani (literary theory), Hitoshi Nagai (solipsism), Shigeki Noya (analytic philosophy), Masahiro Morioka (philosophy of life), Motoyoshi Irifuji (analytic philosophy) are considered to be characteristic philosophers in the Japanese academy.

== See also ==
- Budō
- Giri (Japanese)
- Grace – "itsukushimi"
- Haibutsu kishaku
- Hakkō ichiu
- Hermit – e.g., Yoshida Kenkō, Kamo no Chōmei
- Kami
- Kokutai
- Ma (negative space)
- Maruyama Masao – "Bamboo whisk" culture and "octopus pot" culture
- Nihonjinron
- Shame society
- Wabi-sabi
- Yamato-damashii
- Taoism in Japan
- William Vorilong, one of the first Europeans to get some knowledge about Japanese philosophy

== Bibliography ==
Texts

- James W. Heisig, Thomas P. Kasulis, John C. Maraldo (eds.), Japanese Philosophy: A Sourcebook, Honolulu: University of Hawaiʻi Press, 2011.
- David A. Dilworth & Valdo H. Viglielmo, with Agustin Jacinto Zavala (eds.), Sourcebook for Modern Japanese Philosophy: Selected Documents, Westport: Greenwood Press, 1998.
- R. Tsunoda, W.T.de Bary, D. Keene (eds.), Sources of Japanese Traditions, New York: Columbia University Press, 1964, 2 vols.

Studies

- H. Gene Blocker, Christopher L. Starling, Japanese Philosophy, Albany, N.Y.: State University of New York Press, 2001.
- Hajime Nakamura, History of Japanese Thought: 592–1868. Japanese Philosophy before Western Culture Entered Japan, London – New York: Kegan Paul, 1969.
- Gino K. Piovesana, Contemporary Japanese Philosophical Thought, New York: St John's University Press, 1969.
