= Tsuda Mamichi =

Japanese politician

Baron Tsuda Mamichi
- 津田 真道
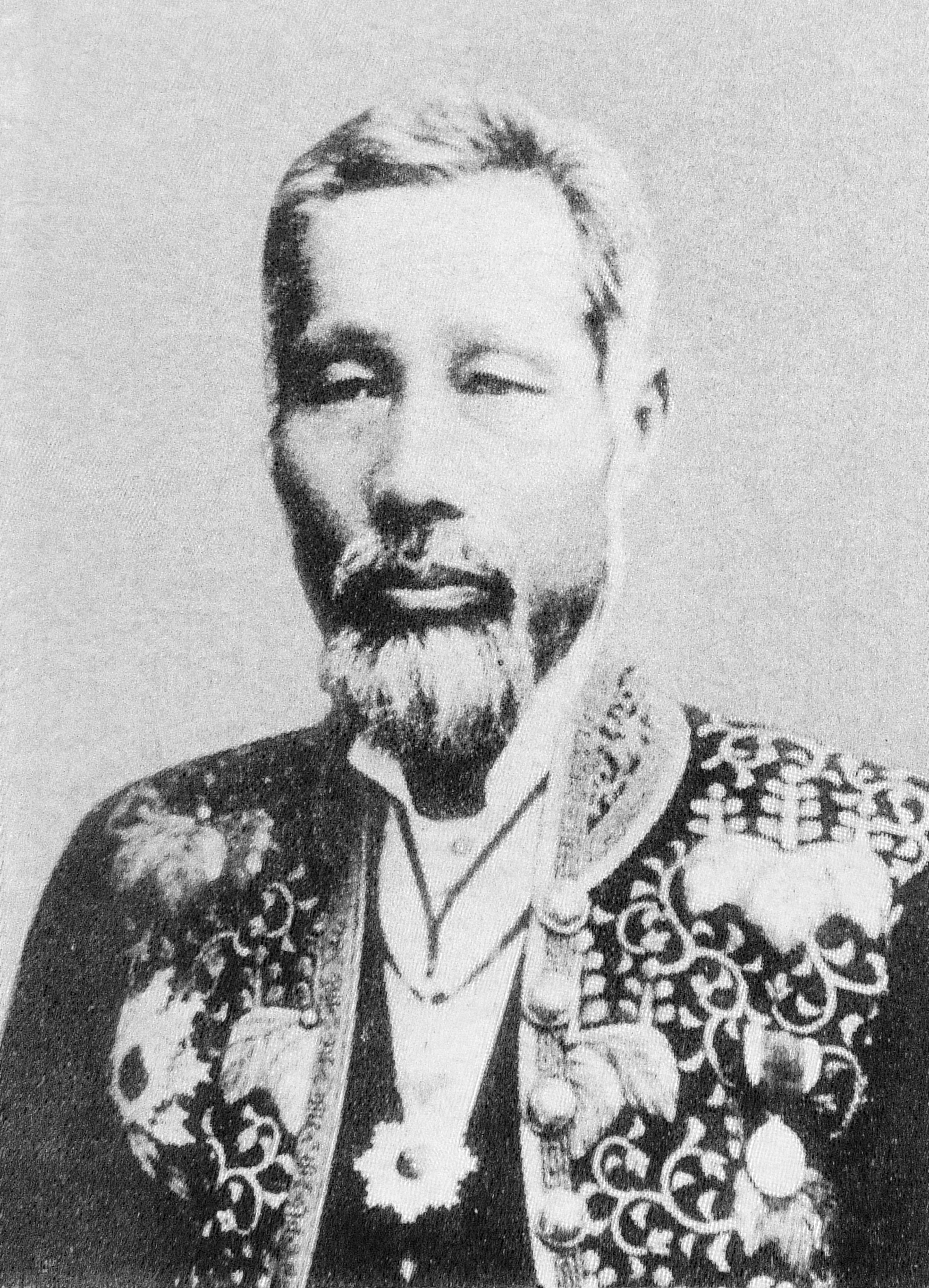

Vice Speaker of the House of Representatives
- In office 26 November 1890 – 25 December 1891
- Speaker: Nakajima Nobuyuki
- Preceded by: Position established
- Succeeded by: Sone Arasuke

Member of the House of Peers
- In office 31 January 1896 – 3 September 1903 Nominated by the Emperor

Member of the House of Representatives
- In office 2 July 1890 – 30 December 1893
- Preceded by: Constituency established
- Succeeded by: Kōsuke Abe
- Constituency: Tokyo 8th

Member of the Genrōin
- In office 8 April 1876 – 20 October 1890

Personal details
- Born: 25 July 1829 Tsuyama, Okayama, Japan
- Died: 3 September 1903 (aged 74)
- Party: Taiseikai (1890–1891)
- Education: Leiden University
- Occupation: Legal Scholar, Politician

Baron Tsuda Mamichi (津田 真道; 25 July 1829 – 3 September 1903) was a Japanese statesman and legal scholar in the Meiji period. He was one of the founding members of the Meirokusha with Mori Arinori, Nishimura Shigeki, Fukuzawa Yukichi, Kato Hiroyuki, Nakamura Masanao, and Nishi Amane.

== Early life ==
Tsuda was born into a local samurai household in Tsuyama Domain (present-day Okayama Prefecture). In his early days, he studied rangaku under Mitsukuri Gempo and military science under Sakuma Shozan. He became an instructor at the Bansho Shirabesho institute run by the Tokugawa bakufu to study western books and science. In 1862, he was selected, together with Nishi Amane, by the government for training in the Netherlands in western political science, constitutional law, and economics. They departed in 1863 with a Dutch physician Dr. J. L. C. Pompe van Meerdervoort, who had set up the first teaching hospital for western medicine in Nagasaki.

The two Japanese students were put in the care of Professor Simon Vissering, who taught Political Economy, Statistics and Diplomatic History at the University of Leyden. They developed a genuine friendship with Vissering who was conscious of the long-standing friendship between Japan and the Netherlands through Dejima. He felt that the students' desire for knowledge would make them likely future participants in Japan's modernization. Vissering, a member of La Vertu Lodge No, 7, Leyden introduced them to Freemasonry, of which they became the first Japanese adherents on 20 October 1864.

== Government career ==
After his return to Japan in 1868, Tsuda wrote the Kaisei Kokuho ron (On Western Law), which was the first book in Japanese on the subject. He was recruited by the new Meiji government and helped in the first codification of Japanese laws. In 1869, he drafted Japan's first laws prohibiting human trafficking, and the new national law code was promulgated in 1870. In 1871, he assisted the Foreign Ministry in negotiations with Qing dynasty China and accompanied Date Munenori to Beijing. He also served in the Genrōin and in the House of Representatives of the Diet of Japan after the 1890 Japanese general election. Tsuda was also an active member of the Meirokusha, and contributed numerous articles to its journal, Meiroku zasshi.

He was ennobled with the title of danshaku (baron) under the kazoku peerage system.

== References and further reading ==
- Auslin, Michael R. Negotiating with Imperialism: The Unequal Treaties and the Culture of Japanese Diplomacy. Harvard University Press (2006). ISBN 0-674-02227-0
- Gordon, Andrew. A Modern History of Japan: From Tokugawa Times to the Present Oxford University Press, 2003. ISBN 0-19-511061-7
- Sims, Richard. Japanese Political History Since the Meiji Renovation 1868-2000. Palgrave Macmillan, 2001. ISBN 0-312-23914-9

Specific
