= Historiography of Chinese philosophy =

The debate over whether the ancient Chinese masters can be counted as philosophers has been discussed since the academic study of philosophy was introduced in China in the 19th century. Cultural immersion in the West by figures such as Hu Shih and Feng Youlan led to an increased interest in a Chinese philosophy and stimulated the creation of this field which had not yet been labeled nor discussed as such until this point.

冯友兰 (Feng Youlan) made a distinction between 中国的哲学 (the philosophical studies of China) and 中国土上的本土哲学 (indigenous philosophy from Chinese soil). The debates over the legitimacy of Chinese philosophy primarily concern the indigenous philosophy of China. They range in their central focus: whether the discipline of "philosophy" existed in traditional Chinese thought; whether the subjects and issues involved in the discipline existed in Chinese thought; and whether the now established discipline of Chinese philosophy can be truly be considered Chinese. These contentions have led to larger discussions about the nature of philosophy and its discipline.

== Confucian Orthodoxy ==
Confucian orthodoxy (Dao tong, 道統) is a historical conception of the "history of Chinese philosophy". It is a conception different from western philosophy emphasizing a continuous transmission of teachings.

== Academic Discipline of Chinese Philosophy ==
The discipline of philosophy did not enter China until the 19th century. Nishi Amane, a Japanese scholar, first translated the term "philosophy" into Chinese as zhexue (wisdom learning) in 1873. Though he originally coined this term solely to refer to the concept of Western Philosophy, the argument posed was that the nature of the discipline of philosophy was in a constant flux, creating an opening for the realm of Chinese philosophy. After the Western infusion at the turn of the 20th century, an emulation of the Western educational system and its way of categorization spread through China. While ancient Chinese education had been based on ethical education, after the Opium War the educational system was considered an obstruction in the realization of Chinese potential. The Dao tong (Confucian orthodoxy) was refashioned into the "history of Chinese philosophy".

The Chinese philosophy of the past included classical learning (jinxue), the learning of the ancient masters (zhuzixue) speculative learning (xuanxue), Buddhist learning, and learning of principle (lixue). While all these branches share common elements with Western philosophy, it was decided that these were not philosophy in their original state. Hence, there was the subsequent distillation by later scholars using Western notions to form a history of Chinese philosophy.

The Rules for Colleges and Universities in 1903 divided academic subjects into disciplines, with classics as one of these disciplines. By 1913, the discipline of classical studies was dropped. There were no divisions of scholarship based on the nature of knowledge in China prior to Western importation. By 1914, Beijing University created a Division of Chinese Philosophy, and in 1919, Cai Yuanpei, the new president, changed the name to the Department of Philosophy. This marked the start of the new academic discipline of Chinese Philosophy.

Chinese philosophy developed under the paradigm of Western philosophy, rather than the other way around, because of the prevalent view in the early twentieth century of the superiority of Western culture. With advanced military, technology, and a wider dissemination of culture, Western systems of knowledge attained a "universal" quality that relegated Chinese paradigms as "local particularities". Yet because any global contact will most likely stimulate change, the transformation of traditional Chinese academics can be seen as both an imposition by the West, as well as a conscious choice by the Chinese to move towards a seemingly inevitable direction.

== Arguments Against the Legitimacy of Chinese Philosophy ==
=== Misinterpretation of Chinese Thought ===
The lack of a formal system in traditional Chinese philosophy motivates the creation of a "systemic overcoat". There is no historical narrative in Chinese philosophy similar to the one that exists in Western philosophy. The material studied under the discipline of Chinese philosophy had been sifted in the early 20th century from the paradigms of classics, poetry, masters, and collected writings to create this field. The academic philosophical model that is applied now to this discipline appeared only after Hu Shih's "Outline of the History of Chinese Philosophy" and Feng Youlan's "History of Chinese Philosophy".

Both Feng Youlan and Hu Shih comprehended the lack of narrative in Chinese thought and thus proceeded to create a categorization that mirrored that of the Western paradigm. However, by preformatting the outline and selectively choosing material that fit, they presented a warped version of the original. An accurate understanding of these texts is impossible because the original context has become obscured. The overcoat may express the concepts of Western philosophy that are present in Chinese thought, but in the process it causes an abstraction from the reality these concepts were couched in originally.

Some argue that Chinese thought cannot be translated into Western jargon, when the philosophical method of the West is used to interpret the non-philosophical texts of China. There are systematic differences in expression between Eastern thought and Western philosophy that prevent comparisons between the two. Some scholars would rather prefer the use of only terminology native to Chinese philosophy to research the history of Chinese philosophy, but others object on the basis of academic diversification. Moreover, the explanation of Chinese philosophy with Chinese terms excludes those without a highly specialized and advanced education in this field. The use of Western terminology allows for a facilitated and more widespread understanding of Chinese philosophy. Still, the danger remains that the continued use of Western discourse will suppress the voices of Chinese scholars and allow the West to retain its dominant position over the East.

Zhang Dainian argues that the overcoat does not harm the inner content; that the cleavage does not destroy the content. Although there are concepts and principles in Chinese philosophy that do not come up in Western philosophy (and vice versa), until there can be a definitive interpretation of the text, a systematic overcoat cannot really be said to confuse the material.

=== The different natures of ancient Chinese thought, modern Chinese thought, and Western philosophy ===
The early pioneers of the field of Chinese philosophy (Fu Sinian, Cai Yuanpei, Zhang Taiyan, Hu Shih) acknowledged the distinctive origin of Chinese thought as Dao Shu (Dao craft) and its implicit difference from Western philosophy. Yet, they also conceded that at that point in time, the Western mode of thought was the only method to convey Chinese philosophy. Along the same vein, a few decades prior to Fu Sinian and Hu Shih's studies there were similar ideas forming in Japan, particularly among the intellectual society known as the Meiji Six Society, as they attempted to introduce Western philosophy to Japan in order to bridge the intellectual gap between the East and the West.

Now modern philosophical scholars, when referencing these ancient texts in their own work, reconstruct these studies and create a logical system that do not retain the spirit of these works. There is a dispute over whether the retention of the traditional Chinese spirit is necessary for the label of Chinese philosophy.

Even modern Western philosophers are in stark contrast with ancient Greek philosophers, demonstrating the nonexistence of a universal philosophy. The two forms of contemporary philosophy are analytical philosophy and continental philosophy, both of which differ greatly from traditional Western philosophy. The modern logical reasoning system of Western philosophy renders it closer to the sciences, while Chinese philosophy stems from history and can be considered a religion.

Scholars whose studies involve an examination of Western philosophy have concluded that the presence of ontology is what makes Western philosophy distinct. However, ontology is not present in traditional Chinese philosophy, which again brings up the issue of whether to the term "philosophy" is appropriate.

=== Political, psychological, and nationalistic motivations ===
==== Blind veneration of the West ====
In attempts for inclusion into the field of philosophy, scholars such as Feng Youlan emphasized certain aspects of classical texts that aligned with Western concepts. Though at least highlighting some shared ideas, these interpretations presented a skewed perspective of classical texts for they did not stay faithful in presenting the true significance of the works. Rather than creating a philosophical model that reflects the Chinese spirit, what has been created is an exaltation of the Western model by imitation.

==== Nationalism ====
The creation of Chinese philosophy can also be seen as a response to the oppressive West. By establishing an independent discipline with a history just as long as the Western version, Chinese scholars hoped to challenge the domination of the West in this field, as well as stimulate national pride.

==== Postcolonial Theory ====
A rejection of the term Chinese philosophy is a rejection of European ethnocentrism. The West has structured the subject, cultural identity, and history of the Third World in a way that forces the Third World to be submissive for they cannot express their subjective experience on their own terms. Instead of advocating a complete overthrow of Western philosophy and its corresponding models, the proposal is to incorporate the Western theories that have already infiltrated the culture and meld them with the national position. While "Western hegemony" per se may be deposed of, Western discourse cannot also go, for it allows the means for the expression and research of philosophy.

=== Linguistic integrity of the term "philosophy" ===
Philosophy itself does not mean just thought; the word is linked to a European history that makes it specific to the West. This is not to say that Eastern thought does not have an equal value to Western thought, but that the label of philosophy can only be assigned beyond this Western European realm.

However, Jing Haifeng argues that this is a rather narrow view of philosophy. Rather, he insists that the development of Western philosophy into China and its subsequent tumultuous transformation created a new discipline that, while unique from indigenous learning, still counts as philosophy.

== Arguments For the Legitimacy of Chinese Philosophy ==
=== Ambiguous definition of "philosophy" ===
There has never been a complete consensus of the definition of "philosophy". If there is to be an argument for a solely Western connotation of philosophy, then the concept of philosophy should be widened to include Chinese thought. However, this sacrifices a conscious definition of what is and what is not philosophy. Those in favor of this prospect refer to the extension of the definition of religion by Western theologians to include Eastern religions. Philosophical models have varied from individuals and civilizations for all of history. Recognition of a pluralistic world culture by both Eastern and Western is necessary for a broader definition of philosophy.

Some argue that Chinese philosophy and Western philosophy have evolved independently and are equally as legitimate. This view escapes the frame of the supreme Western philosophic model and proposes the question of what is philosophy. Western philosophy has the essential component of ontology and developed in that direction. Similarly, Chinese philosophy centers on self-cultivation and thus developed towards ren (benevolence) in self-conduct.

=== Past recognition of Chinese philosophy ===
Western missionaries in the 17th century called Confucius a philosopher. The works of the ancient masters resemble premodern/ancient Western philosophy more so than post-Kantian thought, which could be considered a link to philosophy.

=== Universal topics discussed in Chinese philosophy ===
The topics discussed in ancient Chinese thought are universal in philosophy, the term used generally. The term "philosophy", itself, may not have existed, but the same subject matters were discussed. These include topics such as humanity, human nature, and principle. Deep reflections of life manifest in a multitude of cultures. Mou Zongsan used the concept of the particular and universal in explaining the compatibility of Chinese and Western philosophy: each views the world through their own narrow aperture, but through this aperture, each can attain the truth.

Western disciplines come from universals extracted from studies of individual phenomena and then condensed into systems of knowledge. Though the Chinese did not develop thought to this extent, it can be said that the subjects of these disciplines still existed in Chinese thought. While the strict, regulated Western mode of thinking called logic was not to be found in China, there was still a form of thinking.

The search for wisdom has been prevalent in both ancient Greek and ancient Chinese texts. Socrates thought of philosophy as a lifestyle search for wisdom. Rather than a form of academic thought, philosophy meant a path towards truth and wisdom. Despite the differences in methodology, both the ancient Greeks and ancient Chinese discussed the same topics. The subject of philosophy has been a tradition for both. Hence, the West cannot be said to have an exclusive hold on the term. Philosophy has existed for the Chinese in the Aristotelian sense. These pre-Socratic philosophers bear a resemblance to the ancient Chinese philosophers known as sages.

The ancient Chinese masters' studies were inherently connected to a way of life. Using Socrates and Plato's definition of philosophy as universal knowledge, it follows that if all people must deal with the issue how to conduct themselves, this should be a philosophical issue.

Moreover, in order to assert the legitimacy of Chinese philosophy, many Chinese scholars have argued that it is more than just an ethics-based philosophy. They claim that it contains a metaphysical nature and is both transcendental and immanent. However, the religious nature of this argument has caused sharp criticism from Western sinologists.

== The Crisis Over the Legitimacy of Chinese Philosophy ==
The recent flare up of the debates over the legitimacy of Chinese philosophy has been brought on by a variety of issues. First, there is the lack of recognition from Western colleagues of the legitimacy of this field. Moreover, there is disagreement over appropriate uses of methodology and terminology. The main concern is how scholars can narrate the history of Chinese philosophy in a manner that allows for comprehensive understanding of the topics touched upon. For at the moment, the Western systematic overcoat creates a Chinese history of philosophy that seems incomplete due to the lack of total overlap between China and the West.

In addition, there is disagreement over the quality of contemporary research on ancient Chinese thought. Yu Wujin noted especially a lack of knowledge of both philosophy and classical Chinese texts, lack of perspective, weak abstract thinking, in addition to copying and plagiarizing.

Most do not see these debates over the value of Chinese philosophy, but rather its future.

== Legitimacy of the "Legitimacy of Chinese Philosophy" ==
To interpret Chinese thought as philosophy requires a complete understanding of both fields of Eastern and Western thought. Those who have undertaken this interpretation have been trained in a (Western) philosophical discourse that underlies any study of Chinese thought and directs these studies in a corresponding philosophical manner. Their conclusion has been that philosophical models are not compatible with Chinese models of thought. However, since these scholars themselves have been immersed in the philosophical model, objective evaluation between the two fields becomes impossible. There can be no impartial evaluation because these discussions must stand outside the realm of both philosophy and Chinese thought.

The focus on the methodologies of interpretation rather than the actual text blocks the more significant matter of whether the original material itself can be considered philosophy. A rejection of the concept of "Chinese philosophy" does not answer this question. However, it does help shape the direction for the future of Chinese thought. The acceptance of Chinese thought as a philosophy will only occur if this new field can deepen understanding of fundamental philosophical problems outside of its cultural context.

== Final Analysis and Possible Solutions ==
As a result of this debate, it has been suggested that the legitimacy of Western philosophy must also be considered anew. It is only logical that if there is an examination of Chinese thought by the standards of Western philosophy, there must be a reciprocal examination as well. However, just as the argument goes that Chinese thought cannot be made to fit to the standards of Western philosophy, the reverse is as true.

Another solution proposed is the introduction of more methodologies in order to have more philosophical interpretations to replace the uniform approaches of the 20th century. Since Chinese and Western philosophies are different forms of philosophy, it follows that the two should have distinct forms of expression. However, China has not had one solitary mode of expression through its history of philosophy. There has been a range in the subjects discussed and the means of discussion. Therein lies a primary difference of Chinese philosophy: its value does not lie in the organization of its thinking, but rather whether it can answer significantly the issues of the times.

A history of Chinese philosophy may as well coexist alongside a history of Chinese thought. While Chinese philosophy would remain the particular Chinese ideas that coincide with Western philosophies, Chinese thought would retain the wider spectrum of general knowledge, thoughts, and beliefs that are more applicable in a societal setting and which are included in classical Chinese texts.

A return to the traditional form of Chinese learning seems implausible at this time, as Chinese universities have divided their disciplines in the same manner as the West; as a result, philosophic thinking will most likely follow in the Western direction. In addition, a complete rejection of the term "philosophy" concerning Chinese thought would isolate this field from Western contemporaries making it irrelevant. Instead, much emphasis has been placed on the special nature of Chinese philosophy in an attempt to highlight the inherent differences.

Another solution is to consider all research done thus far on the history of Chinese philosophy as comparative research. Such studies are beneficial in that they allow new perspectives and reveal the unique characteristics of each type of philosophy. Yu Xuanmeng advocates a new structure for comparative study between Western and Chinese philosophy that grants them both the presence of transcendence, though through different means. The Western definition of transcendental means a property-transcending-experience. He reasons that the extension of life in time – that is, the conscious choices made by man of how to involve himself with the world after he examines himself – is also a type of transcendence.

The argument over the legitimacy of Chinese philosophy and the use of the term should not be of higher priority than an extensive study of traditional Chinese thought for the knowledge and understanding of how to solve contemporary societal issues in a global community.

== See also ==
- Legal orthodoxy
