= Japan Academy =

Japanese national academy of science

- 日本学士院; Nihon Gakushiin

Science academy overview
- Formed: 1879; 147 years ago
- Preceding agencies: Tokyo Academy; Imperial Academy
- Jurisdiction: Government of Japan
- Headquarters: Taitō, Tokyo, Japan; 35°42′58″N 139°46′38″E
- Employees: 150
- Annual budget: ¥631,133,000 (2021)
- Science academy executive: Ryōji Noyori, President
- Parent department: Ministry of Education, Culture, Sports, Science and Technology
- Website: www.japan-acad.go.jp/en/index.html

The Japan Academy (Japanese: 日本学士院, Nihon Gakushiin) is an honorary organisation and science academy founded in 1879 to bring together leading Japanese scholars with distinguished records of scientific achievements. The Academy is currently an extraordinary organ of the Ministry of Education, Culture, Sports, Science and Technology with its headquarters located in Taito, Tokyo, Japan. Election to the Academy is considered the highest distinction a scholar can achieve, and members enjoy life tenure and an annual monetary stipend.

== History ==
In 1873, Meiroku-sha (Meiroku Society) was founded. The main people of Meiroku-sha involved in Meiroku-sha were from Kaiseijo (later transformed into University of Tokyo) and Keio Gijuku.

In an effort to replicate the institutional landscape found in many Western nations, the leaders of the Meiji government sought to create a national academy of scholars and scientists modelled to the British Royal Society.

In 1879, Nishi Amane was made the head of what was then called the Tokyo Academy.

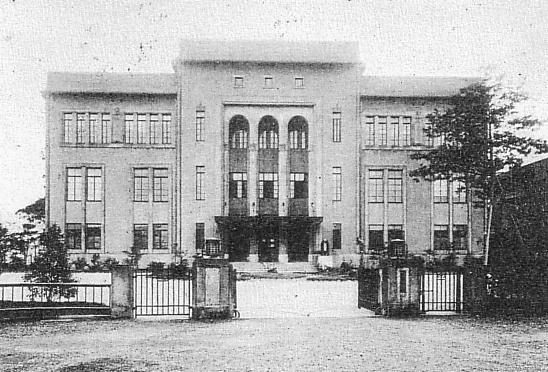
The Imperial Academy circa 1930

In 1906, it was renamed the Imperial Academy, and in 1947 it was renamed the Japan Academy.

== Prizes awarded ==
The Imperial Prize and Japan Academy Prize are awarded to persons who have achieved notable research landmarks or who have authored outstanding academic papers or books. One of the Academy's most important functions involves conferring these prizes, which have been awarded annually since 1911. Since 1949, these prize award ceremonies have been graced by the presence of HIM the Emperor of Japan; and since 1990, both the Emperor and Empress have attended.

=== Japan Academy Prize ===
From 1911 until 1947, the academy annually conferred the Imperial Prize of the Japan Academy (Gakushiin Onshi Shō). Amongst past winners are Hideyo Noguchi (1915) and Tasuku Honjo (1996). After 1947, the name of the award was changed to Japan Academy Prize (Gakushiin Shō).

=== Duke of Edinburgh Prize ===
In 1987, HRH Prince Philip, Duke of Edinburgh suggested that the Academy take responsibility for conferring the biennial Duke of Edinburgh Prize to a Japanese scientist with outstanding achievements in the area of wildlife protection and species preservation. In addition to this specific award, some 75 prizes and medals are associated with The Duke of Edinburgh.

=== Japan Academy Medal ===
Since 2004, the Academy has annually conferred the Japan Academy Medal.

== Timeline ==
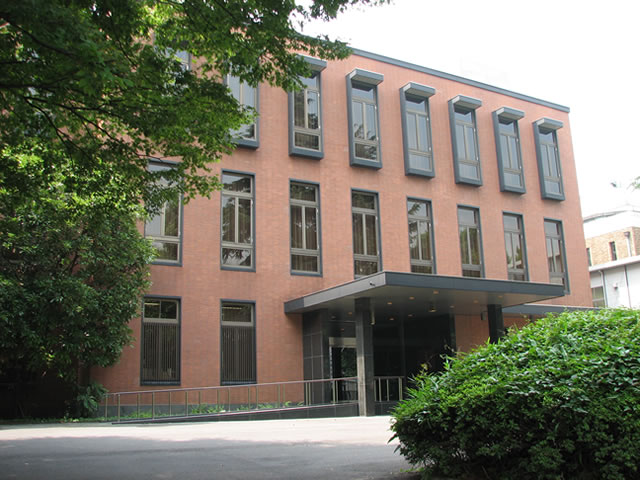
The modern Japan Academy building

The early-Meiji era Tokyo Academy was institutionally re-organized into an Imperial Academy in 1906; and this institution was renamed the Japan Academy in 1947:

- 1879 The Tokyo Academy established; Tokyo Academy Magazine (Vol. 1, No. 1).
- 1890 Tokyo Academy Statute promulgated.
- 1895 Honorary Membership established.
- 1906 Statute of the Imperial Academy promulgated; joined Internationale Assoziation der Akademien (IAA).
- 1911 Imperial Prize and Imperial Academy Prize established; first award ceremony.
- 1912 Proceedings of the Imperial Academy (Vol. 1, No. 1).
- 1919 Imperial Academy joined Union Académique Internationale (UAI).
- 1925 Statute of the Imperial Academy amended (increased membership).
- 1942 Transactions of the Imperial Academy (Vol. 1, No. 1).
- 1947 Imperial Academy renamed Japan Academy.
- 1949 Japan Academy institutionally linked to Science Council of Japan.
- 1956 Law of the Japan Academy promulgated; Japan Academy de-linked from Science Council of Japan.
- 1971 Exchange program with foreign academies started.
- 1983 Visiting program of Honorary Members started.
- 1984 First public lecture meeting was held.
- 1987 Duke of Edinburgh Prize was adopted.
- 2004 Japan Academy Medal established.

== President ==
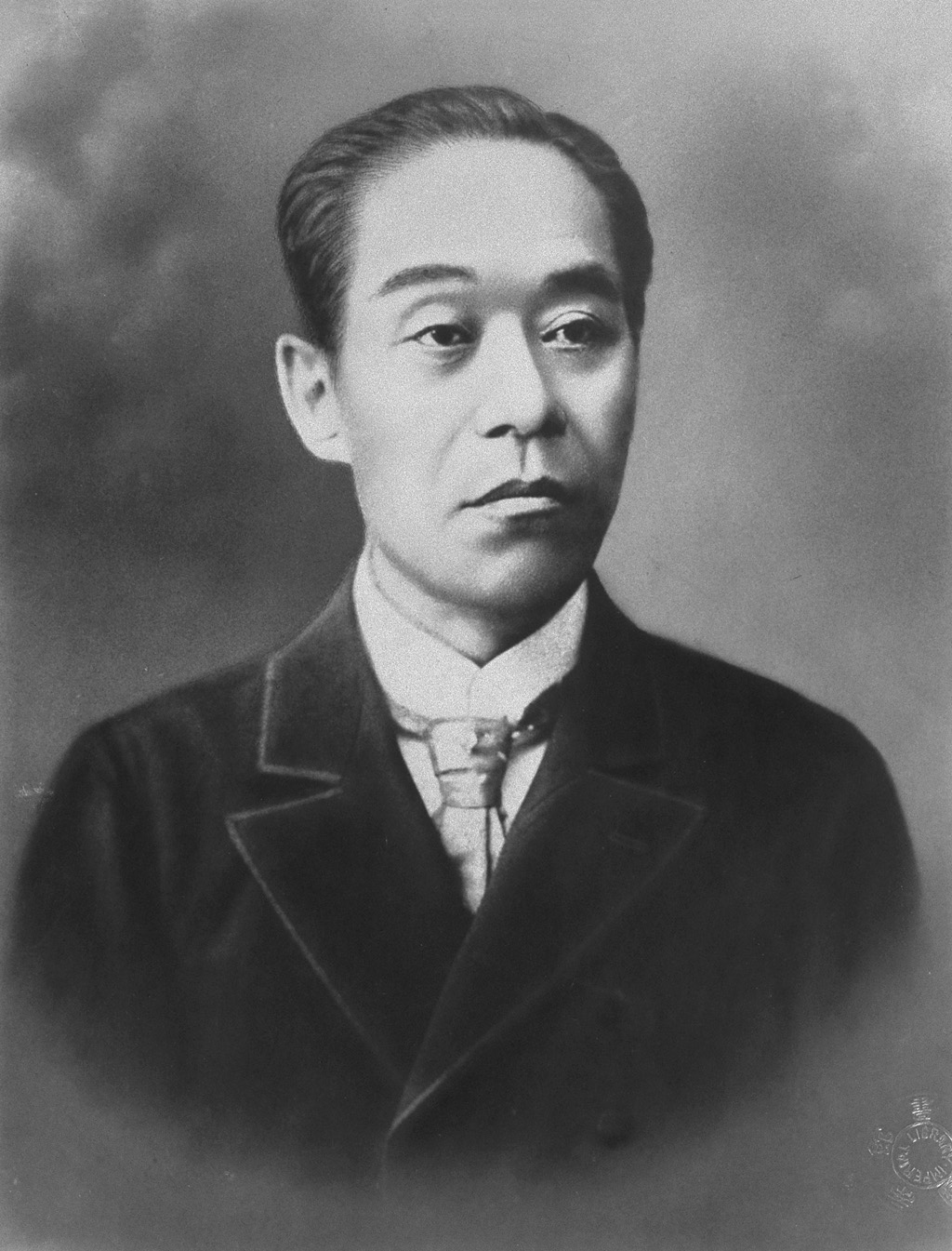
Fukuzawa Yukichi, founder of Meiroku Society, Keio University, and the First President of Tokyo Academy

=== President of the Tokyo Academy ===
No.	Name	Start of Term	End of Term	University
1.	Fukuzawa Yukichi	1879	1879	Keio Gijuku
2.	Nishi Amane	1879	1880	Yōrōkan
3.	Katō Hiroyuki	1880	1882	University of Tokyo
4.	Nishi Amane	1882	1886	Yōrōkan
5.	Katō Hiroyuki	1886	1895	University of Tokyo
6.	Hosokawa Junjirō	1895	1897	Bunbukan
7.	Katō Hiroyuki	1897	1906	University of Tokyo

=== President of the Imperial Academy ===
No.	Name	Start of Term	End of Term	University
8.	Katō Hiroyuki	1906	1909	University of Tokyo
9.	Kikuchi Dairoku	1909	1917	University of Tokyo
10.	Hozumi Nobushige	1917	1925	University of Tokyo
11.	Okano Keijirō	1925	1925	University of Tokyo
12.	Sakurai Jōzi	1925	1939	University of Tokyo
13.	Hantaro Nagaoka	1939	1948	University of Tokyo

=== President of the Japan Academy ===
No.	Name	Start of Term	End of Term	University
14.	Yamada Saburō	1948	1961	University of Tokyo
15.	Shibata Yuzi	1961	1970	University of Tokyo
16.	Shigeru Nambara	1970	1974	University of Tokyo
17.	Kiyoo Wadati	1974	1980	University of Tokyo
18.	Hiromi Arisawa	1980	1986	University of Tokyo
19.	Kurokawa Toshio	1986	1988	Tohoku University
20.	Wakimura Yoshitarō	1988	1994	University of Tokyo
21.	Yoshio Fujita	1994	2000	University of Tokyo
22.	Ichiko Teizi	2000	2001	University of Tokyo
23.	Nagakura Saburō	2001	2007	University of Tokyo
24.	Kubo Masaaki	2007	2013	University of Tokyo
25.	Takashi Sugimura	2013	2016	University of Tokyo
26.	Hiroshi Shiono	2016	2019	University of Tokyo
27.	Hiroo Imura	2019	2022	Kyoto University
28.	Takeshi Sasaki	2022	2025	University of Tokyo
29.	Ryōji Noyori	2025	Present	Kyoto University

== Counterparts in other countries ==
- Royal Society of London
- British Academy
- Romanian Academy
- Hungarian Academy of Sciences
- Royal Swedish Academy of Sciences
- Bulgarian Academy of Sciences
- Academy of Sciences, Institute of France
- Royal Society of Canada
- National Academy of Sciences of the Republic of Korea
- Union of the German Academies of Sciences and Humanities
