= Hiroshi Shiono =

Japanese legal scholar (1931–2026)

- 塩野宏
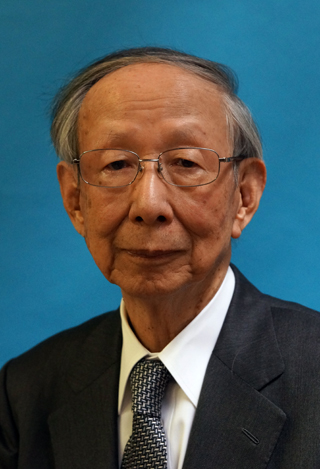
- Born: 13 June 1931; Tokyo, Japan
- Died: 15 April 2026 (aged 94)
- Citizenship: Japan

Hiroshi Shiono (Japanese: 鹽野 宏, 13 June 1931 – 15 April 2026) was a Japanese legal scholar who specialised in administrative law. He held the title of Order of Culture and was an honorary professor at the University of Tokyo, a member of the Japan Academy and its president from 2016, as well as a recipient of the Person of Cultural Merit.

Due to the old character form of his surname, "鹽" is also spelled as "塩野 宏" (Shiono Hiroshi) using the new character form.

Shiono held various positions throughout his career, including professor at the Faculty of Law of the University of Tokyo, professor at the Faculty of Law of Seikei University, professor at the graduate school of University of East Asia (東亜大学, Tōa daigaku), and director of the Japan Broadcasting Culture Foundation, a public interest foundation.

He was president of the Japan Academy from 2016.

== Early life ==
Shiono was born in Tokyo Prefecture and also resided in Kanazawa City. His father was Naomichi Shiono, a top arithmetic and abacus professor. He graduated from the Faculty of Law at the University of Tokyo.

== Legal career ==
Shiono started as an assistant professor and associate professor at the Faculty of Law at the University of Tokyo before becoming a professor. After reaching retirement age, he served as a professor at the Faculty of Law at Seikei University and later at University of East Asia Graduate School of Correspondence Education.

In 1994, he was involved in formulating specific district division proposals for the "300 single-member districts and 200 proportional representation" in the House of Representatives electoral district delimitation deliberation council. In 1998, he became the chairman of the Ministry of Posts and Telecommunications' Radio Wave Management Deliberation Council and received the Order of the Sacred Treasure. In 1999, he became a member of the Japan Academy. In 2009, he was recognized as a Person of Cultural Merit. Since 2011, he has been serving as the Chairman of the Broadcasting Culture Fund. In 2015, he received the Order of Culture. In 2016, he became the 26th President of the Japan Academy.

== Research ==
Shiono studied under Jiro Tanaka, a former Supreme Court judge and honorary professor at the University of Tokyo. He has written numerous articles and case commentaries, including "The Structure of Otto Mayer's Administrative Law" (Yuhikaku, 1962). He has been involved in many legislative processes and has been deeply involved in the amendment of the Administrative Case Litigation Act in 2004 as the chairman of the Administrative Lawsuit Study Group. He also served as the former chairman of the "Human Rights Protection Promotion Deliberative Council" (a consultative body consisting of the Ministry of Justice, Ministry of Education, and other three ministers) that recommended the need for the Human Rights Protection Act in 2001.

== Death ==
Shiono died on 15 April 2026, at the age of 94.
