= Mitsukuri Rinsho =

Japanese politician (1846–1897)

Baron Mitsukuri Rinshō
- 箕作 麟祥
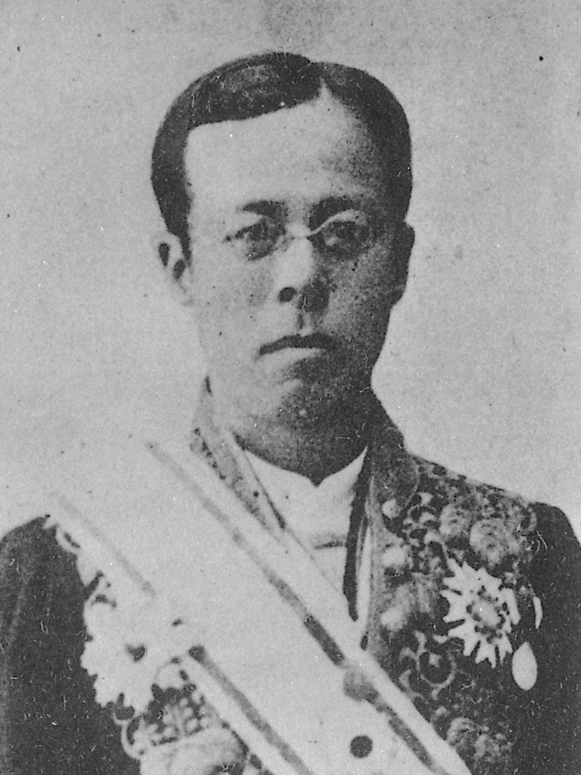

Member of the House of Peers
- In office 29 September 1890 – 29 November 1897 Nominated by the Emperor

Member of the Genrōin
- In office 10 April 1880 – 9 November 1888

Personal details
- Born: 19 September 1846 Edo, Musashi, Japan
- Died: 29 November 1897 (aged 51) Chiyoda, Tokyo, Japan
- Relatives: Ishikawa Chiyomatsu (son-in-law); Hantaro Nagaoka (son-in-law)
- Occupation: Entrepreneur

Baron Mitsukuri Rinshō (箕作麟祥; 19 September 1846 – 29 November 1897) was a Japanese statesman and legal scholar in Meiji period Japan.

== Early life ==
Mitsukuri was born in Edo (present-day Tokyo) to a noted family of scholars working for the Tokugawa bakufu. He studied rangaku and received a posting to the Bansho Shirabesho, the Shōgun's research institute for foreign technology. In 1867, he was selected to accompany the Shogunate's expedition to the Paris World Exposition, which proved to be an eye-opener.

== Meiji Bureaucrat ==
On his return to Japan, Mitsukuri joined the new Meiji government as a translator. He worked closely with foreign advisors from France, especially Gustave Emile Boissonnade, de Fontarabie on drafting Japan's new commercial law and civil law codes. He also served on the Genrōin, and was active in the Meirokusha.

He later served as Vice Minister of Justice from 1888–1889, the House of Peers and as chief justice of the Administrative Court. He was also president of Wafutsu University, the predecessor of Hosei University. Shortly before his death, he was ennobled with the title of danshaku (baron) under the kazoku peerage system.
