= Kanda Takahira =

Japanese politician

Baron Kanda Takahira
- 神田 孝平
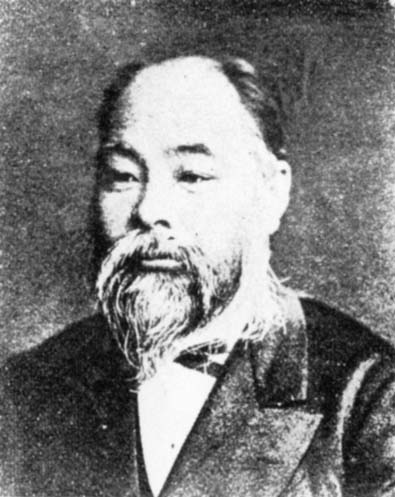

Member of the House of Peers
- In office 29 September 1890 – 10 February 1891 Nominated by the Emperor

Member of the Genrōin
- In office 28 February 1880 – 20 October 1890
- In office 3 September 1876 – 6 February 1877

Governor of Hyōgo Prefecture
- In office 20 November 1871 – 3 September 1879
- Monarch: Meiji
- Preceded by: Nakayama Nobuyoshi
- Succeeded by: Morioka Masazumi

Personal details
- Born: 31 October 1830 Fuwa, Mino, Japan
- Died: 5 July 1898 (aged 67) Awajichō, Tokyo, Japan

Kanda Takahira (神田 孝平; 31 October 1830 – 5 July 1898; pen name Kanda Kōhei) was a scholar and advisor on economics and governmental structure in Meiji period Japan. His translation of William Ellis's Outlines of Social Economy (1846), which he translated to Japanese from a Dutch edition in 1867, is regarded as Japan's earliest study of western economics.

His many other works include An Outline of Natural Law (Seihō ryaku), a volume published in 1871 which he edited based on Nishi Amane's lecture notes which in turn drew from Dutch economist Simon Vissering.

== Early life and education ==
Kanda was born in the Fuwa District of Mino Province, (present-day Gifu Prefecture). He studied rangaku and taught algebra. In 1855, he started meeting with Katsuragawa Hoshū II and Yanagawa Shunsan to work on the Collected Dutch Words (Oranda jii), a Dutch–Japanese dictionary.

In 1862, he became a scholar at the Tokugawa shogunate's Institute for the Study of Barbarian Books (Bansho Shirabesho), researching western science and technology.

== Career ==
After the Meiji Restoration, Kanda worked for the new Meiji government in many roles including general-affairs official of the Bureau of Institutional Investigation. He was appointed governor of Hyōgo Prefecture.

In 1869, he proposed adoption of a Chinese-style civil service examination system which was rejected, although exams were later introduced for professional appointments. In 1870, Kanda drew on the taxation section of Outlines of Social Economy to propose land tax reforms, which were later implemented during the Land Tax Reforms of 1873. He also established local administration structures. He was a charter member of the Meiji Six Society (Meirokusha) established in 1873.

He served in the Council of Elders (Genrōin), and was afterwards appointed to the House of Peers in 1890. He was ennobled with the title of danshaku (baron) in the kazoku peerage system.

In 1887, Kanda was appointed the first president of the Anthropological Society of Tokyo. An avid collector of ancient stone implements, he was the author of the illustrated catalog Notes on Ancient Stone Implements, &c., of Japan (1884).

== Personal life ==
His adopted son was Kanda Naibu.
