= Meiroku zasshi =

Japanese magazine (1874–1875)

- Publisher: Hochisha Company
- Founded: 1874
- First issue: 2 April 1874
- Final issue Number: 14 November 1875; 43
- Country: Japan
- Based in: Tokyo
- Language: Japanese

Meiroku zasshi (明六雑誌) was a Japanese language magazine which was in circulation between 1874 and 1875 during the Meiji period.

== History and profile ==
Meiroku zasshi was launched in 1874, and the first issue was published on 2 April 1874. The founders were the members of Meirokusha, a group of Japanese intellectuals, including Fukuzawa Yukichi. The publisher was the Hochisha Company, and it was published on a B6 size or A5 size calligraphy paper. Leading contributors included Mori Arinori, future education minister of Japan, and Tsuda Mamichi.

Meiroku zasshi is one of the earliest publications in Japan which covered writings on Western culture. Given that it was a publication of the Meiji period it frequently discussed education-related topics in regard to morality in the family as well as in the nation. Meiroku zasshi sold nearly 3,000 copies in 1884.

Meiroku zasshi was published twice or three times per month and folded following the 43rd issue which appeared on 14 November 1875.

In 1975 William Braisted published a book on the magazine entitled Meiroku Zasshi: Journal of the Japanese Enlightenment.
