= Nishi Amane =

Japanese politician

Baron Nishi Amane
- 西 周
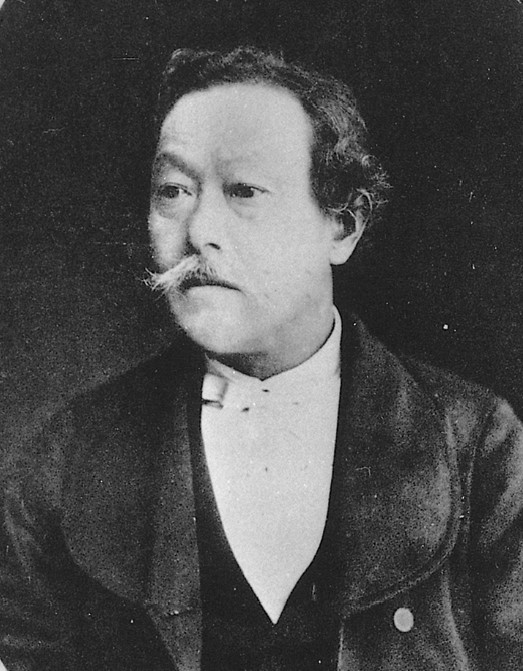

Member of the House of Peers
- In office 30 September 1890 – 10 February 1891 Nominated by the Emperor

Member of the Genrōin
- In office 24 May 1882 – 20 October 1890

Personal details
- Born: 7 March 1829 Tsuwano, Iwami, Japan
- Died: 30 January 1897 (aged 67)
- Resting place: Aoyama Cemetery
- Occupation: Politician, Philosopher

Baron Nishi Amane (西周; 7 March 1829 – 30 January 1897) was a Japanese philosopher. He studied law and economics in the Netherlands. He became a political advisor to Tokugawa Yoshinobu before and after the Meiji Restoration. He served as a bureaucrat in the Ministry of War, the Ministry of Education, the Ministry of Popular Affairs, and the Ministry of the Imperial Household under the Meiji government. He was involved in the drafting of the Military Precepts and the Imperial Rescript to Soldiers and Sailors. With Mori Arinori and others, he formed the Meirokusha and worked to introduce Western philosophy.

== Early life ==
Nishi was born in the Tsuwano Domain of Iwami Province (present day Tsuwano town, Shimane Prefecture) as the son of a samurai physician who practiced Chinese medicine. A child prodigy, he is said to have read the Classic of Filial Piety at the age of four and Four Books and Five Classics at the age of six. In 1853, after studying Confucianism at his domain school and in Osaka, Nishi was sent to Edo to study rangaku, with the goal of becoming an interpreter for conducting business with the outside world via Dutch traders based at Dejima in Nagasaki. His duties also included the translation of European books into Japanese for review by a select group of government officials within the Tokugawa bakufu. In 1854 Nishi, as well as several fellow Japanese intellectuals of the time, denounced the Japanese feudal system and their samurai status in favor of a pursuit of Western studies, as these intellectuals believed that the Japanese feudal system was incompatible with Western studies. Nishi was then appointed by the government as a Yōgakusha or specialist scholar of Western learning. Aside from Nishi, the Yōgakusha included Fukuzawa Yukichi, Mori Arinori, and Nakamura Masanao, who were all schooled in kangaku, a kind of traditional Chinese learning. Later, in 1857, Nishi was appointed a professor at the Bansho Shirabesho.

With increasing foreign pressure on Japan to end its national isolation policy, in 1862 the Shogunate decided to send Nishi and Tsuda Mamichi to the Netherlands to learn western concepts of political science, constitutional law, and economics. They departed in 1863 with a Dutch physician Dr. J. L. C. Pompe van Meerdervoort, who had set up the first teaching hospital for western medicine in Nagasaki.

The two Japanese students were put in the care of Professor Simon Vissering, who taught Political Economy, Statistics and Diplomatic History at the University of Leyden. They developed a genuine friendship with Vissering who was conscious of the long-standing friendship between Japan and the Netherlands. He felt that the students' desire for knowledge would make them likely future participants in Japan's modernization. Vissering, a member of La Vertu Lodge No, 7, Leyden introduced them to Freemasonry, of which they became the first Japanese adherents on October 20, 1864.

== Meiji philosopher ==
Nishi returned to Japan in 1865, and was an active participant in the Meiji Restoration. He promoted contact with the West and Western intellectualism because he feared that in the long run, a domestic resistance to modernization and change in relation to contact with the West would be more destructive to Japan than any plausible repercussions of contact with the West. While abroad, Nishi became enthralled with Western philosophy and discerned that this intellectual pursuit subsisted at the foundation of Western civilization, and thus upon his return, he aimed to spread the Western Philosophy he came into contact with in order to help bridge the intellectual gap between the East and the West. Nishi brought back to Japan the philosophies of positivism, utilitarianism and empiricism, which he transmitted through his writing, lectures and participation in Mori Arinori's Meirokusha, and contributed numerous articles to its journal. Through Nishi’s transmissions, positivism was able to thrive in Meiji Japan because it gave the Japanese people a chance for stabilization and understanding in a society and culture that was undergoing rapid revolutionary change. To Nishi, positivism was the Western counterpart to Eastern practical studies (jitsugaku), with an emphasis on a hierarchy of knowledge similar to that of Confucianism. Nishi’s translations of utilitarianism were also taken to well during the restoration period because utilitarianism promotes the social over the individual, which is a concept that is easily reconcilable with a Confucian-trained mind in Meiji Japan. Utilitarianism also assisted Japanese modernization because Nishi and others have applied it to the justification of an industrial and commercial economy. As for empiricism, Nishi and the rest of the Yogakusha intellectuals became leading figures in the Meiji Enlightenment (bummei kaika, i.e. "civilization and enlightenment" ), in which they promoted empiricism and practical studies instead of abstract reasoning in order for each person to attain an understanding of truth.

In 1868, Nishi translated and published "International Law". He also published an encyclopedia, The Hyakugaku Renkan, patterned after the French encyclopedia of Auguste Comte, while promoting the teachings of John Stuart Mill. Nishi’s encyclopedia essentially classified and categorized the intellectual realm of Western civilization, including topics such as literature, natural sciences, mathematics, theology, and politics. One of Nishi’s most significant topics in his encyclopedia was the importance of the study of history, as he believed history was an objective, scholarly discipline that was necessary for the understanding of all human relations and interactions. In this way, learning should not just be for learning’s sake, as it does not serve a greater purpose if it is just to learn. This argument stood in direct contradiction to the Confucian denial of the study of history as a progress of human events. Subsequently, the most distinguished topic of Nishi’s encyclopedia is his elaboration on philosophy. Nishi split the study philosophy into numerous subtopics, citing logic as the most important. He rejected the deductive method traditionally used by Confucian scholars in favor of inductive logic as a more scientific way of learning.

In 1873, Nishi helped to found Japan’s first scholarly society for solely academics (and not politics) known as the Meiji Six Society. The goals of this society were to educate and enlighten the people because they believed Japan needed an enlightened populace in order to understand and live up to its political and moral responsibilities of modernization and restoration. Nishi felt that if the new state were to become enlightened as it should be, there would be no more conflict between political and scholarly obligations within the Meiji Six Society, and within Japanese society in general. Nishi was unique in this society in that he maintained a view of Japanese modernization in which he reconciled traditional Confucianism with Western Philosophy and pragmatism together in order to ascertain the correct path for Japan to take.

In his Hyakuichi-Shinron, published in 1874, he went so far as to reject Confucian ethics altogether as no longer appropriate for Japan, but was careful not to reject Japanese heritage. This publication was an original piece of Nishi scholarship that dealt with two main topics: the separation of politics and morals, and the distinction between human and physical principles. In regards to the first topic, Nishi felt that the later Confucians who presumed that self-cultivation was all that was necessary for ruling society were wrong, but that the original Confucians who proclaimed that the morality taught had practical application in society were right. What is more is that Nishi portrayed Confucius as a teacher of politics with a sideline of morality. Nishi attempted to sever the philosophical connection between morality and politics because he thought that although they obtained the same objective – to better people’s lives – they used different methods to obtain this objective, stemming from his belief that rightness was at the base of law, whereas goodness was at the base of morality. To Nishi, morality is an omnipresent thing existing within every human activity, but law is strictly limited to its defined aspects of human relations. Though morality must rely on the law within politics to keep order, it is morality, rather than the law, that will eventually penetrate and shape the people’s minds and values. Nishi concludes this first topic with the idea that when it comes to civilization, politics is the machinery and morality is the lubricant that is responsible for keeping the machinery running and intact. In the second topic, Nishi determines, for the first time in the East, the relationship and differences between human principles and physical principles. He discerns that physical principles and laws are a priori prerequisites for the existence of society, whereas human principles and laws are a posteriori devices derived from these physical principles and laws. Because human principles are a posteriori, they have infinite possibilities of distinctions and greater flexibility in premonitions. Nishi considers morality and law to be human principles; however, that does not mean that he deems morality man-made; rather, there are feelings (not unlike the Mencian Sprouts) that exist in all humans, and it is up to human will to act upon those feelings of morality that are constant in human nature. What Nishi’s discernment led to was the first expression in the East that human society was not, in fact, a product of the invariable structure of the universe. In this way, Nishi opened up room for humans to divert the inevitability of the social hierarchy.

In Jinsei Sampo Setsu (1875) he urged all Japanese to seek the goals of health, knowledge and wealth, or what he called the “three treasures,"in place of Confucian subservience and frugality. In order for society to maintain a balance of these three treasures, Nishi felt that individuals should not disrespect others’ treasures, and that individuals should assist others in acquiring their treasures, thus, if the three treasures were honored and preserved, all of society would be independent and free. Moreover, Nishi thought that the Japanese government should be responsible for promoting the pursuit of these three treasures in society as well, and in turn, the political and national strengthening within the Meiji Enlightenment would not require Western rule or governmental tactics. Nishi promoted that if policy were structured based on enhancing general happiness through an equal balance of domestic enforcement of law, diplomacy and military defense of society, encouragement of industry and finance, and obtainment of the state’s own three treasures, this would be the key to good government.

== Meiji bureaucrat ==
While working at the Ministry of Military Affairs, Nishi helped in drafting the Conscription Ordinance of 1873, which introduced universal conscription and laid the foundation for the Imperial Japanese Army. In his lectures to the military, he emphasized discipline and obedience over seniority and hierarchy. These ideals found their way into the subsequent Imperial Rescript to Soldiers and Sailors in 1882.

In 1879 Nishi was made the head of the Tokyo Academy, and by 1882 was a member of the Genrōin. He became a member of the House of Peers of the Diet of Japan after the 1890 Japanese general election.

He was ennobled with the title of danshaku (baron) in the kazoku peerage system. His grave is at Aoyama Cemetery in Tokyo.

== Legacy ==
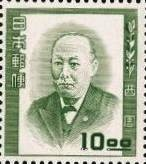
Nishi Amane

Nishi Amane is considered to be the father of Western philosophy in Japan. Nishi was a tireless advocate of Western civilization as a role model for Japan's modernization, stressing the need to evolve without losing the Japanese character. He was responsible for using classical Chinese terminology to translate and/or transmit common terms used in Western Philosophy into Eastern dialect, and many of these philosophical words are currently in use today. By using classical Chinese terminology, that is, something of cultural importance and tradition to Meiji Japan, Nishi was able to generate enthusiasm for reform, as traditional Chinese characters were seen by the Eastern population as a notion of authority. Furthermore, it is the nature of Chinese characters to be combined in various ways to form neologisms, as the characters often obtain multiple meanings and are capable of interchangeability.

He was honored on a 10-yen Japanese commemorative postage stamp in 1952.

=== Coinage of tetsugaku as a translation for "philosophy" ===
Nishi is credited for coining the term tetsugaku (哲学; in kyūjitai, 哲學) sometime in 1867 or earlier as a translation of the Dutch term filosofie, although it only occurred in a publication for the first time in 1874. Prior to this, he had used various translations, some more directly from Dutch, including kitetsugaku (希哲學; 1861, 1862, 1870–1871), hirosohi (no gaku) (ヒロソヒ(之學); 1861–1862) and hirosohī (斐(ヒ)鹵(ロ)蘇(ソ)比(ヒー); 1863–1865). The original term, kitetsugaku (希哲學), was a literal translation from the Greek philosophía, and was composed of ki (希; lit. 'admire') for philo‑, tetsu (哲; lit. 'wisdom') for sophía, and ‑gaku (學; lit. 'study'; suffix for academic disciplines). The Sino-Japanese verbal morpheme ki (希) was inspired by the Neo-Confucianist Zhou Dunyi's quote in Tōngshū (通書), 聖希天賢希聖士希賢 (lit. 'the holy admire heaven, the wise admire the holy, the learned admire the wise'), specifically the last two characters, 希賢 (lit. 'admire the wise'), which Nishi said to be a possible translation, only to end up opting for 希哲 instead. The ki, however, was eventually omitted, so instead of "the study of admiring wisdom", the final term tetsugaku (哲學) simply means "the study of wisdom." Nishi had studied philosophy in the Netherlands, although in explaining the etymology of tetsugaku in his 1873 treatise Seisei Hatsuun (生性發蘊), he also mentioned the English philosophy and the French philosophie. The term rigaku (理學), which referred to Neo-Confucianism, (Note: Also used as a Japanese term for western natural sciences in general.) had also been used as a translation (for example, of the French philosophie) by the likes of Nakamura Masanao and Nakae Chōmin; as stated in Seisei Hatsuun, however, Nishi deliberately avoid conflating the Chinese philosophy with what he conceived of as western philosophy and opted for tetsugaku instead of rigaku.

Tetsugaku is the first known recording of an Eastern term representing the notion of philosophy, which Nishi referred to as “the study of human nature and the principles of things.” Though Nishi felt that Confucius for the East was comparable to Socrates for the West, in creating this term tetsugaku, Nishi was actually attempting to separate the notion of Western philosophy from the notion of Eastern thought, as he believed the two to entail two different things. Moreover, Nishi did not concur that philosophy even existed in the East, as he studied philosophy solely in the context of the Western style. However, regardless of Nishi’s personal beliefs on the definition of “philosophy”, it is still because of him that China and Japan have even been able to engage in the discourse of “philosophy.” In Hyakugaku Renkan, Nishi concluded that because the discourse of philosophy is innately concerned with addressing and attacking theories of past writers and philosophers in order to portray new discoveries, the field of philosophy is constantly being made over. Under this light, Nishi opens up the possibility of vast Eastern participation in the discourse of philosophy, regardless of whether or not Eastern thought can be reconciled with Western Philosophy. During his time, Nishi concurred that although the West was superior in the realm of philosophy, the East still had the means to become better equipped in philosophy, as he professed that philosophy was essential for making the East intellectually modernized.

The Japanese coinage has become the sole word for "philosophy" as an academic discipline in Chinese and Sino-Xenic vocabulary, including Mandarin zhéxué, Korean 철학 (cheolhak) and Vietnamese triết học.

== Nishi Amane former residence ==
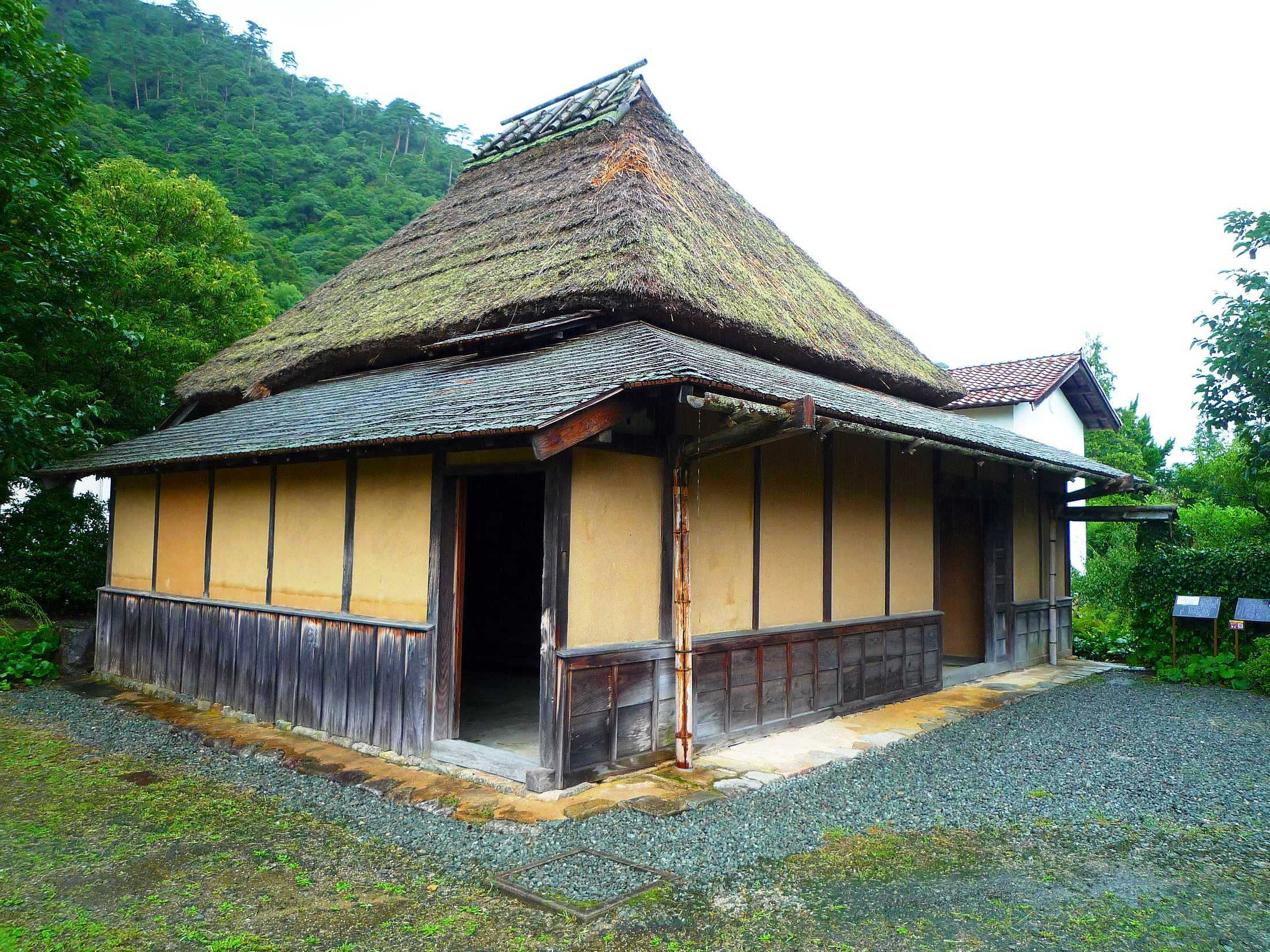
Nishi Amane former residence in Tsuwano

The building which Nishi Amane used as his study from the age of 4 to 25 in Tsuwano still exists and is preserved as a museum. The site is surrounded by earthen walls, and in addition to the main house and storehouse, there is a garden and a farmland on the back side, which is the basic layout of a samurai residence. The main building where Nishi lived was destroyed in a fire in 1853, and the main building that remains today was rebuilt after the fire. However, the storehouse survived the fire, and is a one-story wooden structure with earthen walls and a thatched roof. Nishi's study was a three tatami mat room on the left side of the building. It was designated a National Historic Site in 1987. Across the Tsuwano River, is the former residence of Mori Ogai.

== See also ==
- Japanese encyclopedias

== Bibliography ==
- Cooney, Owen. "Shaping Modern Japan Through Kangaku: The Case of Nishi Amane". Masters Thesis. Columbia University. Retrieved 2012-05-08.
- Defoort, Carline. "Is 'Chinese Philosophy' a Proper Name? A Response to Rein Raud", in Philosophy East and West 56, no. 4 (2006): 625–660.
- Gluck, Carol. (1985). Japan's Modern Myths: Ideology in the late Meiji Period. Princeton: Princeton University Press.
- Godart, George Clinton (January 2008). "'Philosophy' or 'Religion'? The Confrontation with Foreign Categories in Late Nineteenth Century Japan". Journal of the History of Ideas. 1 69: 71–91.
- Havens, Thomas R.H. (1970). Nishi Amane and modern Japanese thought. Princeton: Princeton University Press.
- Jansen, Marius B. (2000). The Making of Modern Japan. Cambridge: Harvard University Press.
- Marra, Michael F. (2002). Japanese hermeneutics: Current Debates on Aesthetics and Interpretation. Honolulu: University of Hawai'i Press.
- Minear, Richard (Summer 1973). . "Nishi Amane and the Reception of Western Law in Japan". Monumenta Nipponica. 2 28: 151–175.
- Murphy, Alex. "Traveling Sages: Translation and Reform in Japan and China in the Late Nineteenth Century". Studies on Asia. Kenyon College. Retrieved 2012-05-08.
- Ramsey, Robert (April 2004). "The Japanese Language and the Making of Tradition". Japanese Language and Literature. 38 1: 81–110.
- Saitō, Takako. "The meaning of Heaven according to Nishi Amane," in Frontiers of Japanese Philosophy, edited by James W. Heisig (Nagoya: Nanzan Institute for Religion and Culture, 2006): 1–21.
- Steben, Barry. "Nishi Amane and the Birth of "Philosophy" and "Chinese Philosophy" in the Early Meiji Japan".
- Wei-fen, Chen. "The Formation of Modern Ethics in China and Japan: The Contributions of Inoue Tetsujiro and Cai Yuan-pei". Article. Retrieved 2012-05-08.
