= Sakuma Shōzan =

Japanese politician and scholar

- 佐久間 象山
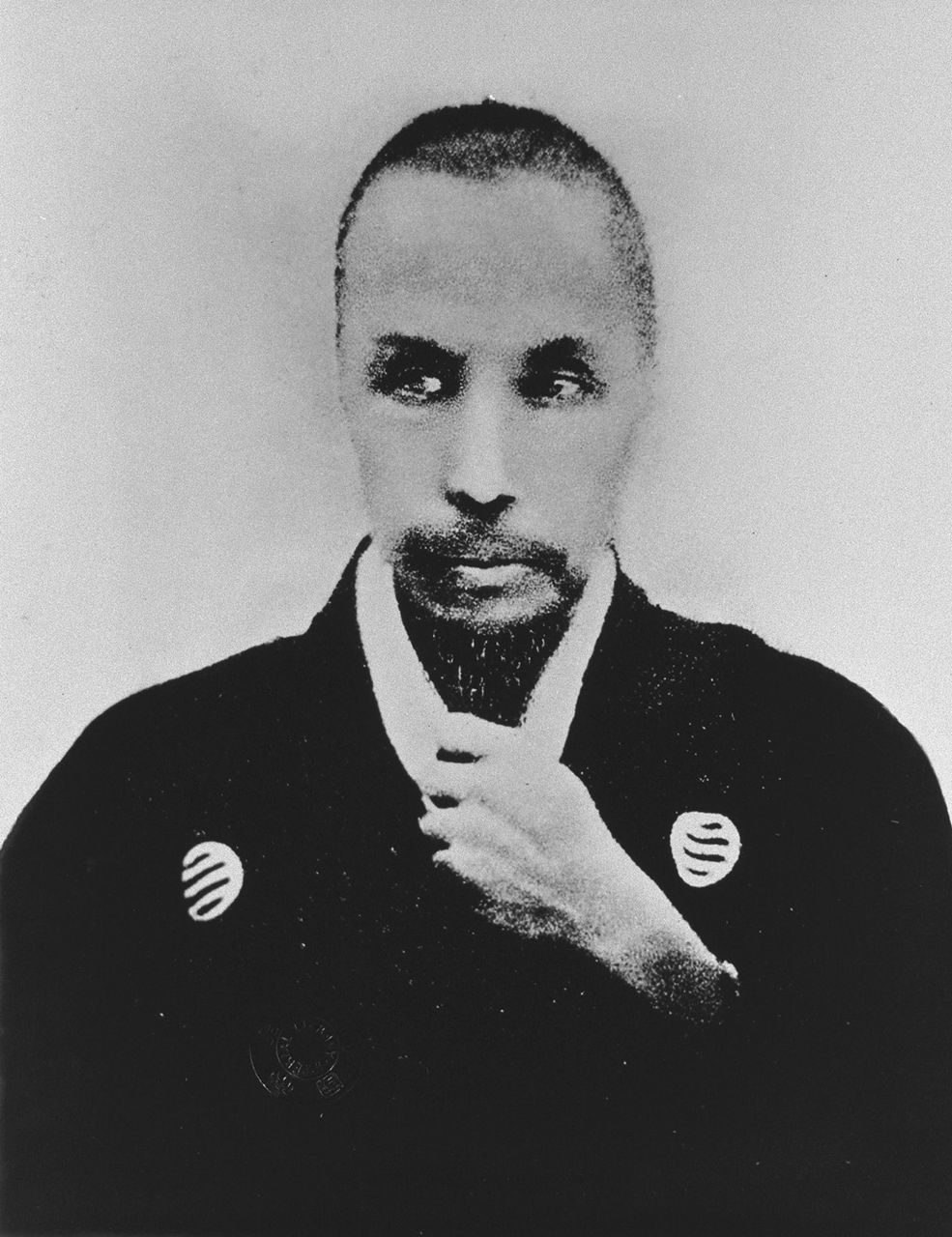
- Born: Sakuma Kunitada; March 22, 1811; Shinano Province, Japan
- Died: August 12, 1864 (aged 53); Kyoto, Kyoto Prefecture, Japan
- Cause of death: Assassination
- Other name: Sakuma Zōzan
- Occupations: politician, scholar
- Spouses: Ochō; Katsu Junko (m. 1853–1864)
- Children: Miura Keinosuke (son), with Ochō
- Parent(s): Sakuma Ichigaku (father); Arai Mann (mother)

Academic background
- Education: Nirayama Juku

Academic work
- Era: Edo period
- Notable students: Yoshida Shōin; Katsu Kaishū; Sakamoto Ryōma; Nakaoka Shintarō; Hashimoto Sanai; Katō Hiroyuki; Nishimura Shigeki; Yamamoto Kakuma
- Main interests: rangaku
- Notable works: Kaibō hachi-saku (海防八策, Eight policies for the defense of the sea)

Sakuma Shōzan (佐久間 象山) (sometimes called Sakuma Zōzan; March 22, 1811 – August 12, 1864) was a Japanese politician and scholar of the Edo period.

== Biography ==
Born Sakuma Kunitada, he was the son of a samurai and scholar Sakuma Ichigaku (佐久間 一学) and his wife Arai Mann (荒井 まん), and a native of Shinshū (信州) (or Shinano Province) in present day's Nagano Prefecture. At the age of 23, he went to Edo and for 10 years studied Chinese learning (漢学).

He then started to study Western sciences ("rangaku") at the age of 33, with the help of the rangaku scholar Kurokawa Ryōan (黒川良安). In 1844, he obtained the Huishoudelyk Woordboek", a Dutch translation of Nöel Chomel's encyclopedia, from which Sakuma learned how to make glass, and then magnets, thermometers, cameras and telescopes. The encyclopedia was later translated into Japanese by Utagawa Genshin (宇田川玄真) under the title Kōsei shinpen (厚生新編).

In 1849, he learned about electricity, through the book of the Dutch scientist Van den Bergh, and created Japan's first telegraph, five years before the introduction of such a telegraph by Commodore Perry in 1854. He also invented electric machines derived from the erekiteru electric device.

From 1842, following an analysis of the defeat of China against Great Britain in the First Opium War and the spread of Western influence in Asia, Sakuma actively proposed the introduction of Western military methods to the Bakufu and the establishment of maritime defense, through his book Eight policies for the defense of the sea (海防八策, Kaibō hassaku ). After the Bakufu ordered Japanese translations of the Military History of the Qing dynasty (聖武記, Shèngwu Ji) and the Illustrated Treatise on the Maritime Kingdoms written by Chinese scholar Wei Yuan (1794–1857), Sakuma was struck by the similarities in their ideas in defending against the west. His writing brought some fame, and he became the teacher of several future leaders of modernization (Yoshida Shōin, Katsu Kaishū, Sakamoto Ryōma, Nakaoka Shintarō, Hashimoto Sanai, Katō Hiroyuki, Nishimura Shigeki, Yamamoto Kakuma).

In 1853, when Yoshida Shōin was convicted for attempting to stow away on one of Perry's ships, Sakuma was also sentenced by association to house arrest (蟄居), which he endured for 9 years. During the arrest, he continued to study Western sciences, and developed various electric machines based on the erekiteru and the Daniell battery, Japan's first seismometer, as well as improvements to guns. After his release, Sakuma Shozan emphasized that the only solution to the country's conflicts was to move the Imperial court from Kyoto to Hikone Castle, and continued to advocate opening Japanese ports to foreign traders, as well as reinforcing the Bakufu through collaboration with the Imperial administration (Kōbu gattai).

== Assassination ==
In July 1864, Shōzan and a few of his retainers were on their way to Kyoto on horseback. Shōzan's horse was mounted with a European saddle, and he possessed a copy of the imperial decree about the opening of the country's ports to foreign trade. He was on a mission to meet with a member of the imperial family to explain his ideas and to seek the permission of Emperor Kōmei to legally open Japanese ports to foreign trade. He was unable to meet with the member of the imperial family and decided to return from his failed visit.

On August 12, 1864, as he reached the Sanjō-Kiyamachi district of Kyoto, his retainers, a considerable distance behind and making no effort to catch up with him, failed to notice that two mysterious men were following him on foot. Soon Shōzan was ambushed and attacked by a small group of assassins from the Higo and Oki clans in broad daylight. Shōzan fell from his horse and bled profusely from the attack, with the assassins approaching him with swords drawn. Shōzan was killed by one of the assassins, a hitokiri named Kawakami Gensai, who landed a death blow on him. Upon his death, the assassins immediately fled from the scene before his retainers arrived. Shōzan was later found to have thirteen wounds inflicted on him by the assassins.

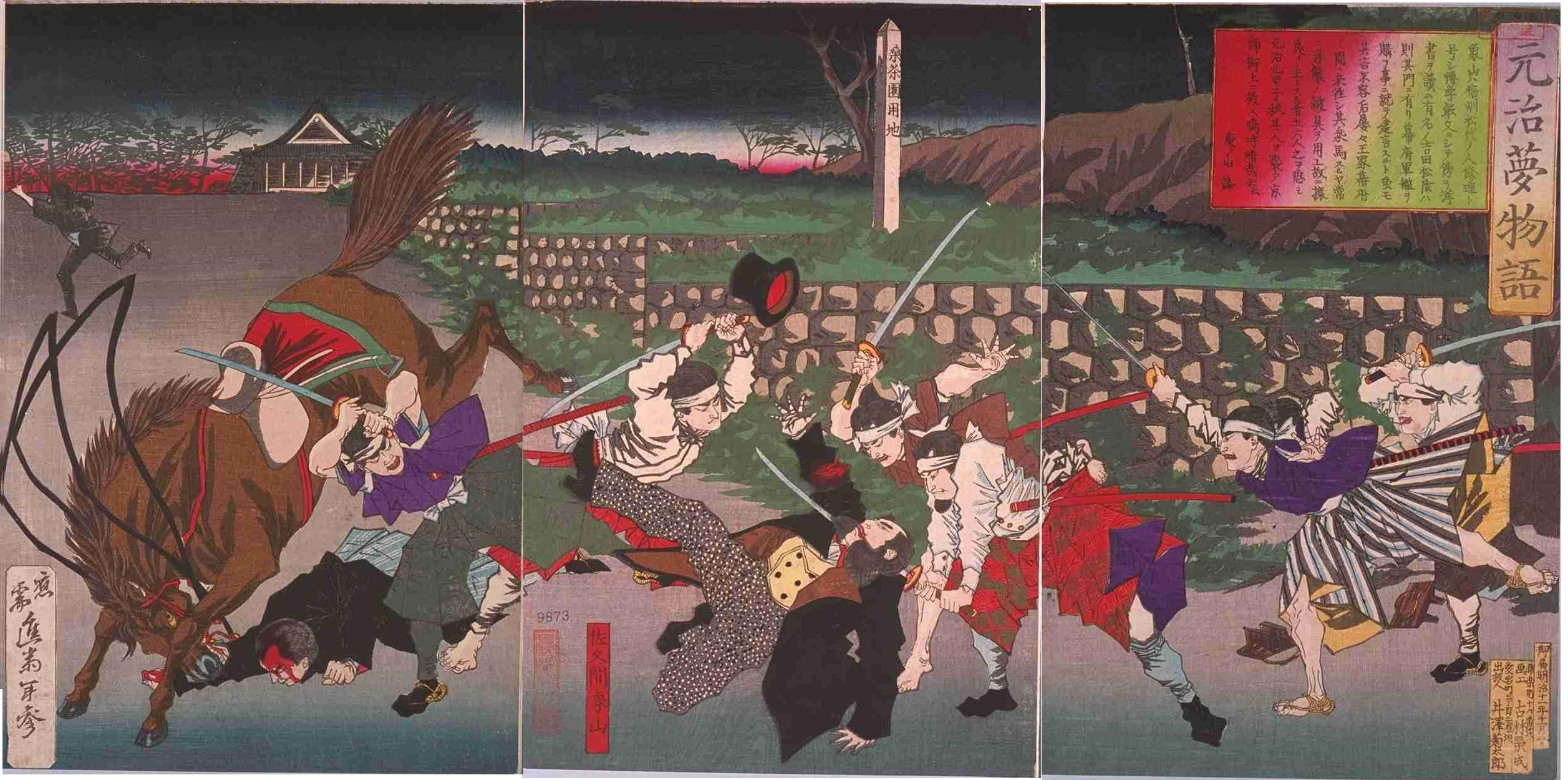
Genji yume monogatari (1878), woodblock print by Kobayashi Toshikazu depicting Shōzan's assassination during the Genji era

Shortly after the incident, at Tenryu-ji, Kyoto, Kawakami Gensai told his confederates, "It was the first time I actually felt I'd killed someone; the hair on my head stood on end because he was the greatest man of all time."

On the day following Shōzan's death, a sign was put up at the main gate of Gion Shrine explaining the reason for the killing:

Shōzan advocated European studies and maneuvered for the opening of ports to trade. That alone could not be ignored. Further, in conspiracy with the vile Aizu and Hikone clans, he tried to move the emperor to Hikone. Since he was an evil and heinous traitor, we inflicted just punishment upon him.

— Imperial Loyalists

== Family ==
Shōzan kept at least two mistresses. One whose name was Ochō bore his only son on 6 December 1848. Later at the age of 42 he married Katsu Kaishū's 16-year-old younger sister Katsu Junko in 1853.

His son Miura Keinosuke (三浦啓之助), real name Sakuma Kakujirō, was a member of the Shinsengumi, which he joined in September 1864 to avenge his father's death.

== Legacy ==
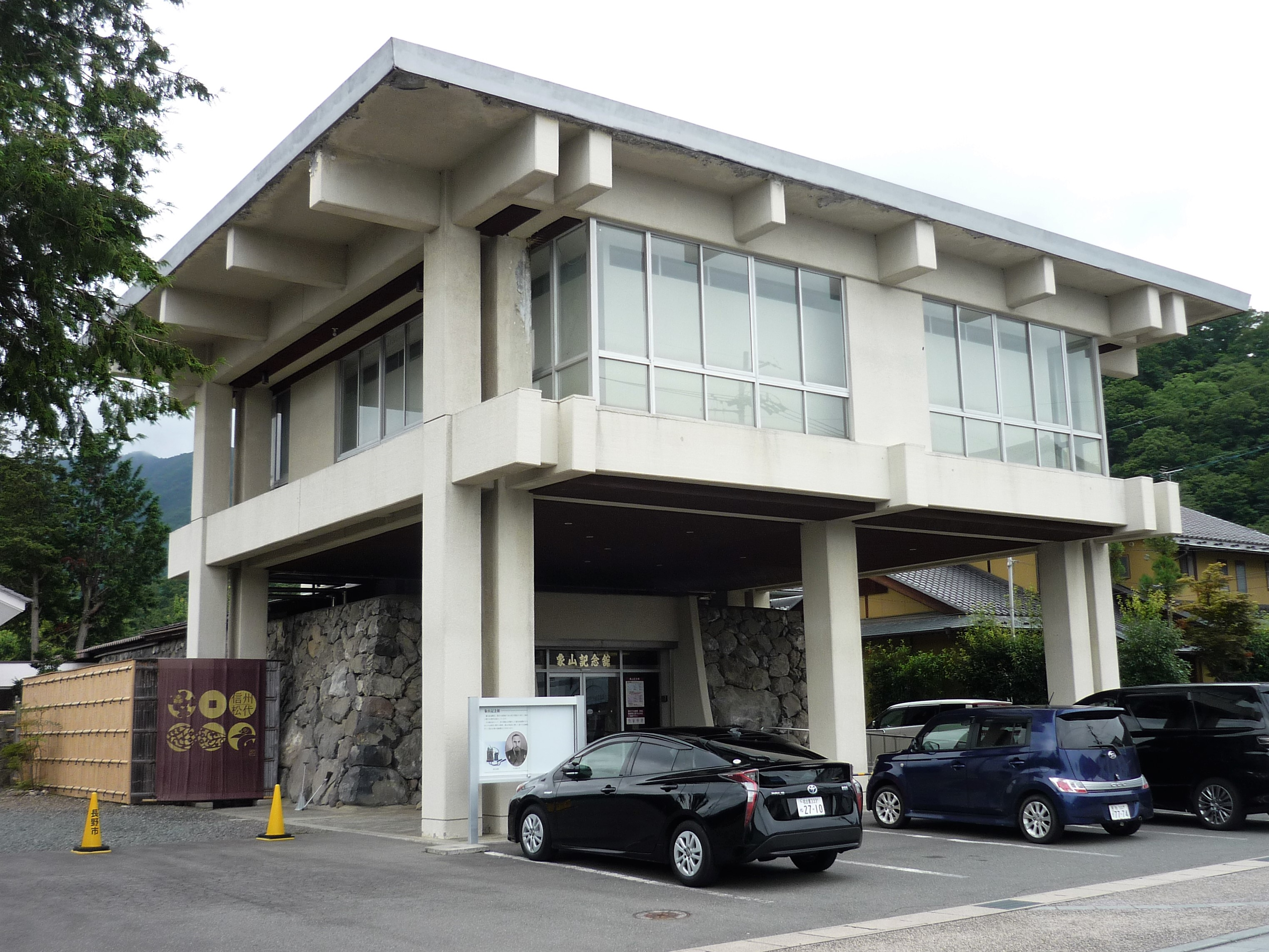
Zozan Memorial Hall

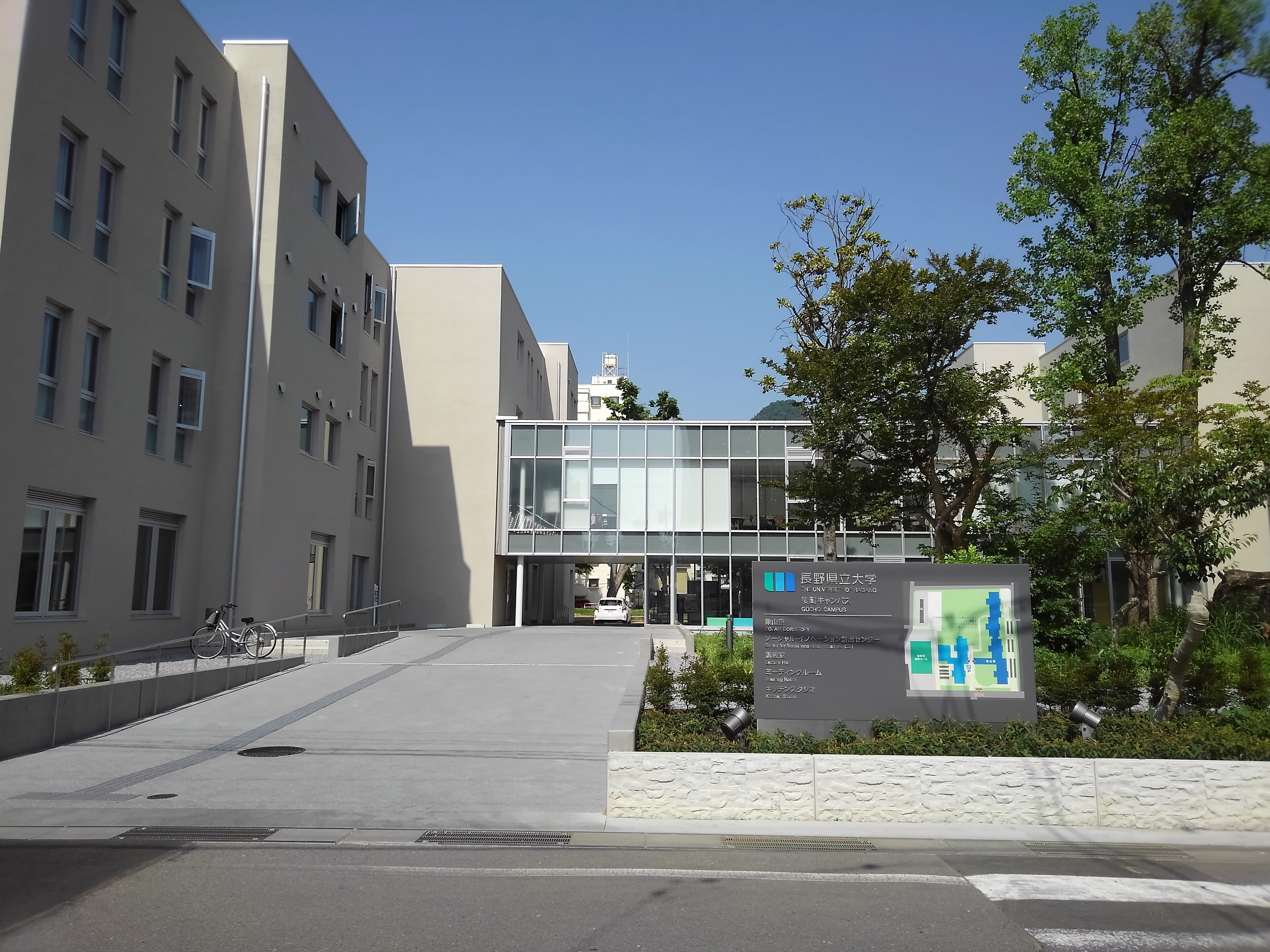
University of Nagano, Gochō Campus, with Zozan Dormitory indicated on the sign, and to the left

Sakuma Shōzan coined the phrase "Eastern ethics, Western technical learning" (tōyō dōtoku, seiyō gakugei, 東洋道徳西洋学芸) which was later further abbreviated as "Japanese spirit, Western technique" (wakon yōsai, 和魂洋才). This latter slogan is still in use as a description of the way that Japan ought to handle modernization.

The Shōzan Shrine was established in 1938 at Matsushiromachi Matsushiro, Nagano, with the two-story Shōzan Memorial Hall (象山記念館) which was later built nearby.

A memorial bearing his likeness was erected near his assassination site, along Kiyamachi Road along the banks of the Takase River in Kyoto.

A bronze statue of Sakuma Shōzan named Mr Sakuma Shōzan (佐久間 象山 先生) was erected at Kawanakajima, Nagano and unveiled on June 2, 1959 to commemorate the 100th anniversary of the opening of the Port of Yokohama.

Another statue of Sakuma Shōzan mounted on the horse, also named Mr Sakuma Shōzan (佐久間 象山 先生) was erected at the Shōzan Shrine to commemorate the 200th anniversary of his birth.

=== The University of Nagano ===
The University of Nagano (長野県立大学, Nagano Kenritsu Daigaku), a public university located in Nagano, Nagano, which opened in 2018, named its dormitory, Zozan Dormitory (Zōzan Ryō, 象山寮) at its Gochō Campus (後町キャンパス) after Sakuma Shōzan.

Sakuma Zozan, a scholar of Western learning in the last days of the Tokugawa Shogunate, was born in Shinshu. The young people who learned at his private school became a driving force in pioneering a new age. The University of Nagano aims to act as a source for regional revitalization and reinvigoration and as a base for knowledge that will activate industry, culture, and lifestyles in Nagano.

In addition, Sakuma is the name of the student-made, student resource guide at the University of Nagano; and Zōzangaku is a required course for first-year students in the Global Management Department at the university in which students hear from entrepreneurs, government officials, and others, about special innovations and initiatives.
