= Wataru Hiromatsu =

Japanese philosopher (1933–1994)

- Born: August 11, 1933; Yamaguchi Prefecture, Japan
- Died: May 22, 1994 (aged 60)
- Occupation: Philosopher

Academic background
- Education: University of Tokyo
- Influences: Ernst Mach, Immanuel Kant, Karl Marx, Friedrich Engels, Edmund Husserl, Martin Heidegger, Georg Wilhelm Friedrich Hegel, Maurice Merleau-Ponty.

Academic work
- Influenced: Shinji Miyadai, Satoshi Shirai, Masaru Sato, Japanese Communist League, Kyoji Chisaka.

Wataru Hiromatsu (廣松 渉, August 11, 1933 – May 22, 1994) was a Japanese philosopher. He was a professor emeritus at the University of Tokyo. His pen name was Gyōshō Kadomatsu (門松暁鐘).

== Life ==
He was born in Yanagawa, Fukuoka Prefecture. His birthplace was Asa District, Yamaguchi Prefecture (present-day Sanyo-Onoda). In 1946, when he was in the first year of junior high school, he joined the Democratic Youth League of Japan. In April 1949, he joined the Japanese Communist Party at the same time as he entered high school. When the Cominform criticized the JCP in 1950, he belonged to the Internationalists, and after the dissolution of the Internationalists' "National Unification Conference" in 1951, he did not return to the party and was active in the Zengakuren.

After being expelled from Fukuoka Prefectural Densikan High School, he passed the university entrance exam and obtained the qualification to enter university. He entered Tokyo Gakugei University but dropped out and re-entered the Department of Philosophy at University of Tokyo. Initially, he was strongly interested in Ernst Mach, but on the recommendation of his supervisor, he decided to concentrate on the study of Kant. He then went on to graduate school at the University of Tokyo. In 1965, he completed the course requirements for the doctoral program and left the university.

In July 1955, he rejoined the party following the Sixth National Conference of the Japanese Communist Party, but left the party the following year after his co-authored book The Student Movement in Japan (日本の学生運動), was criticized. In December 1958, when the Communist League, which was hostile to the JCP, was formed, he continued to support it by writing theory. It is said that the journal Situation (情況), first published in 1967, was founded with 1 million yen in aid from Hiromatsu, according to its founder Susumu Koga. In 1990, when socialism in the Soviet Union and Eastern Europe were collapsing, he was also involved in the launch of a civic organization, Forum 90s (フォーラム90s).

From 1965 to 1970, he taught German language and philosophy at Nagoya Institute of Technology and Nagoya University. He joined Nagoya Institute of Technologyin 1965, became an associate professor in 1966, a lecturer at Nagoya University in 1967, and an associate professor in 1969. In 1970, he resigned from Nagoya University in support of the student movement. He was also a lecturer at Hosei University and a professor at the College of Arts and Sciences at the University of Tokyo. He retired from the University of Tokyo in March 1994. He died of lung cancer on May 22, 1994.

== Philosophy ==
Hiromatsu's thought is based on Marxism and attempts to break away from modernity.

=== Reification ===
Hiromatsu argued for a shift from the Marx's theory of alienation to "reification theory" (物象化論), criticizing the former's reliance on the "subject-object" dichotomy. He claimed the "subject-object" dichotomy is a modern construct, and behind the construct lies in the "primacy of relations" (関係の一次性). While alienation theory posits that a subject, through labor, imbues a product with "value" and consequently becomes alienated from it, Hiromatsu challenges this understanding of "value."

From the perspective of reification theory, Hiromatsu argues that the determinant of "value" lies in the "social relations of producers to total labor." It is not the act of an individual's labor but rather the "total labor" (総労働) of individuals intertwined in a network of relations that paradoxically determines the "value" of individual labor. Thus, the value produced by an individual's labor is not directly attached to the product. Instead, the value of individual labor is assigned retroactively from the total labor, creating the illusion that a specific subject has imbued the product with value. Marx referred to this phenomenon as a "quid pro quo" and identified it as commodity fetishism.

=== Co-subjective existential structure of the world ===
Expanding upon reification theory, Hiromatsu developed his unique concept of the "co-subjective existential structure of the world" (世界の共同主観的存在構造). He argued that the modern "subject – object" schema leads to a problematic 3-fold schema of "act of consciousness – content of consciousness – object itself", which has been invalidated scientifically by Gestalt psychology.

Instead, Hiromatsu proposes the "objective two factors and subjective duality" (対象的二要因と主体的二重性) of phenomena. He argues that the phenomenal world we perceive inherently possesses a "four-limbed structural relation" (四肢的構造連関) where these overlap:

- Regarding phenomenal objects, Hiromatsu states that they "appear immediately, each time anew, as something more than mere sensory data." For example, when we see a pencil, we recognize it as a pencil. Objects are always cognized within the structure of "as something". This structure implies that the ideal "Something" (in this case, a pencil) is "incarnated" in the real given. Hiromatsu does not view the real and the ideal as mutually exclusive opposites; rather, he believes that the real and ideal are structurally unified in a dyadic manner within the object.
- Regarding the subject, Hiromatsu argues that phenomena can exist not only for me but also for others, and the phenomena vary by the subject. For example, when hearing the sound of a clock, a Japanese speaker might hear "kachi kachi," while an English speaker might hear "tick tock." In other words, the way the given "Something" is conscious is co-subjectivized by the community. Therefore, Hiromatsu believes that the subject to whom the object opens "towards" is not simply me as an individual but rather "me as we." He argues that the subject to whom the phenomenal world opens "towards" possesses a dyadic duality of "the who as someone" (誰かとしての誰).

Combining these respective dyadic qualities, Hiromatsu describes the tetradic structural relation as the mode of existence of the world where "the 'given', as something more, is true to a 'someone as someone' (Gegebenes als etwas Mehr gilt einem als jemandem)", that is, the world we experience is not simply an objective reality "out there" but is co-created with the given sensory data, our active interpretation, and our social and cultural context.

=== Overcoming modernity ===
Hiromatsu discusses the concept of "overcoming modernity" (近代の超克) as a summary of wartime thought. He specifically assesses the Kyoto School's theory of overcoming modernity from a Marxist perspective, noting that it addressed "human alienation" (人間疎外) and aimed to overcome this "alienated" historical situation. The Kyoto School's philosophical anthropology attempted to grasp human existence relatively, considering the "reality of life" (生の現実) and including "emotional aspects" (情意的な面) in contrast to the Enlightenment view of humans as merely "rational beings." Hiromatsu criticizes the Kyoto School for remaining within the framework of modernity. He points out that philosophical anthropology is rooted in humanism, which corresponds to the horizon of modernity, often referred to as the "age of anthropocentrism" (人間中心主義の時代). Consequently, he argues that it is merely a form of typical modern philosophy and ideology.

=== Marxism ===
Hiromatsu's political thought was heavily influenced by his mother, a member of the JCP. He developed a philosophy, engaging with Marx and Engels's theory of reification, as well as the ideas of Mach, Husserl, and Heidegger, in an attempt to overcome the subject-object dichotomy.

Regarding The German Ideology, which Marx and Engels left as a draft and was later edited and published, the edition by Vladimir Adoratsky, by the Marx-Engels-Lenin Institute in 1932. Hiromatsu pointed out the problems with this edition. He subsequently published his independently edited New Edition of The German Ideology and other monographs. In The German Ideology, he developed his own view that Marx's thought underwent a shift from the alienation theory of his earlier Economic and Philosophic Manuscripts of 1844 to the reification theory of his later period. At the time, many interpreted Marx and Engels's thought with alienation theory as the central axis, so Hiromatsu's interpretation, which attempted to understand Marx based on the later reification theory, caused controversy. He published his Marxist trilogy, The Formation of Marxism, The Horizon of Marxism, and The Logic of Marxism, (マルクス主義の成立過程, マルクス主義の地平, マルクス主義の理路) between the 1960s and 1970s.
