= Nishimura Shigeki =

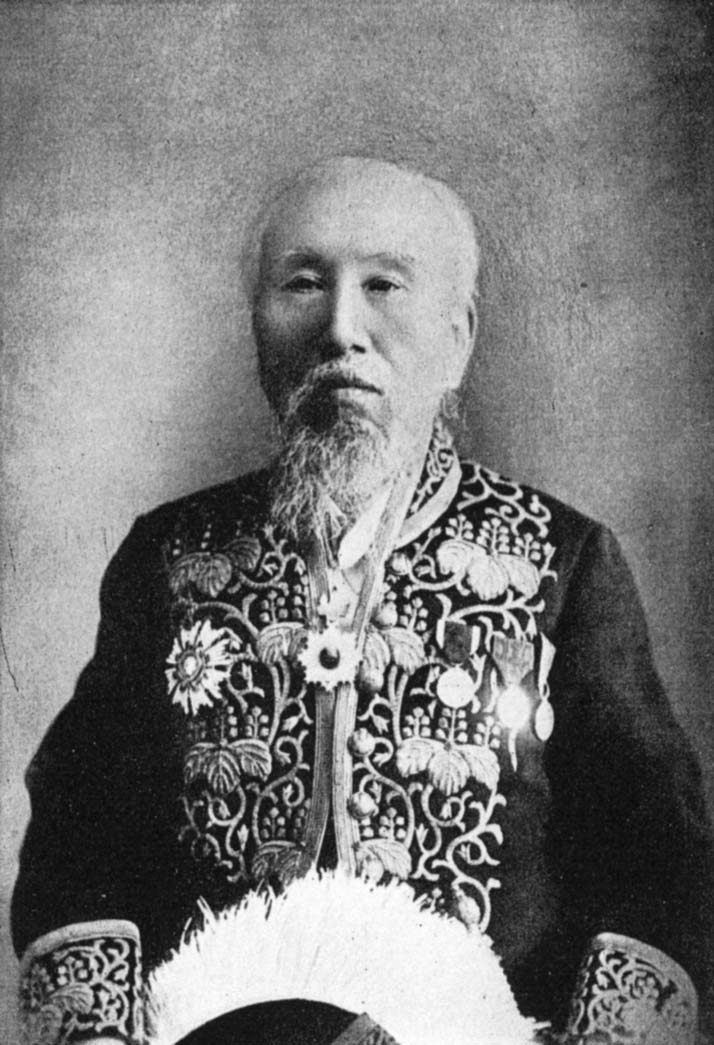
Nishimura Shigeki

Nishimura Shigeki (西村 茂樹; 26 April 1828 – 18 August 1902) was a Japanese educator and leader of the Meiji Enlightenment during the Meiji period. He also went by his pen-name of Nishimura Hakuo. He wrote more than 130 books and over 200 articles in his long literary career.

Born to the family of the samurai chief administer to the daimyō of Sakura domain, Shimōsa Province (present-day Chiba Prefecture), Nishimura was originally a Confucian scholar, but he studied rangaku as well. He supported the Tokugawa bakufu against the Meiji Restoration, but was so highly regarded that the new Meiji government recruited him to assist in the movement to educate the Japanese public on the western world.

He was a founding member of the Meirokusha with Mori Arinori, and contributed numerous articles to the Meiroku Zasshi journal, on a wide range of topics, including on the relevance of ethics to government, a comparison of world government systems and world economic systems.

Nishimura established his own intellectual society in 1876 to stress moral values. This became the Nihon Kodoka (Japan Society for Expansion of the Way), which proved to be a great success. The society promoted the belief that a reassertion of Japan's traditional moral values was necessary to strength Japan in the modern world.

Nishimura believed that the Meiji government should serve a purpose to the people of Japan. He thought the government was superficial and should be rigid and clear in its laws. (In comparison to the Meiji government constantly changing their policies.)

He was appointed to the House of Peers in 1890.
