= Imperial Rescript to Soldiers and Sailors =

1882 Japanese military ethics code

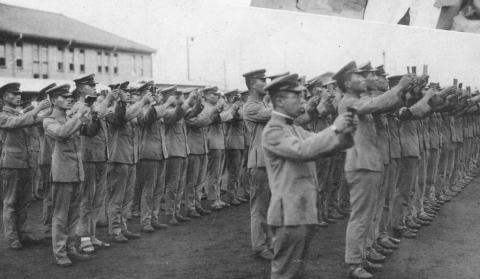
Daily formal reading of the Imperial Rescript to Soldiers and Sailors, at the IJA Engineering College, 1939

The Imperial Rescript to Soldiers and Sailors (軍人勅諭, Gunjin Chokuyu) was the official code of ethics for military personnel, and is often cited along with the Imperial Rescript on Education as the basis for Japan's pre-World War II national ideology. All military personnel were required to memorize the 2700 kanji document.

The Rescript was issued by Emperor Meiji of Japan on 4 January 1882. It was considered the most important document in the development of the Imperial Japanese Army and Imperial Japanese Navy.

== Description ==
The Imperial Rescript was primarily written by Inoue Kowashi and Yamagata Aritomo (two of the Meiji Oligarchs), along with some stylistic flourishes added by the pro-government author Fukuchi Gen'ichirō.

The Rescript was presented to Army Minister Yamagata Aritomo directly by Emperor Meiji in person in a special ceremony held at the Tokyo Imperial Palace. This unprecedented action was meant to symbolize the personal bond between the Emperor and the military, making the military in effect, the Emperor's personal army. Coming shortly after the Satsuma Rebellion, the Rescript stressed absolute personal loyalty of each individual member of the military to the Emperor. The Rescript also cautioned military personnel to avoid involvement with political parties or politics in general, and to avoid being influenced by current opinions in the newspapers, reflecting Yamagata's distrust of politicians in particular and democracy in general. The Rescript also advises military personnel to be frugal in their personal habits (reflecting back to the samurai tradition), and respectful and benevolent to civilians (reflecting on European traditions of chivalry). However, a clause that the military was subordinate to civilian authority did not make it into the final draft.

The Rescript also contains a number of Confucian themes such as "obedience to one's superiors", as well as drawing upon Buddhist influences in that "[t]he soldier and the sailor should make simplicity their aim." A precept in the Imperial Rescript to Soldiers and Sailors states that "duty is heavier than a mountain; death is lighter than a feather".
