= Katō Hiroyuki =

Japanese politician

Senior Second Rank Baron Katō Hiroyuki
- 加藤 弘之
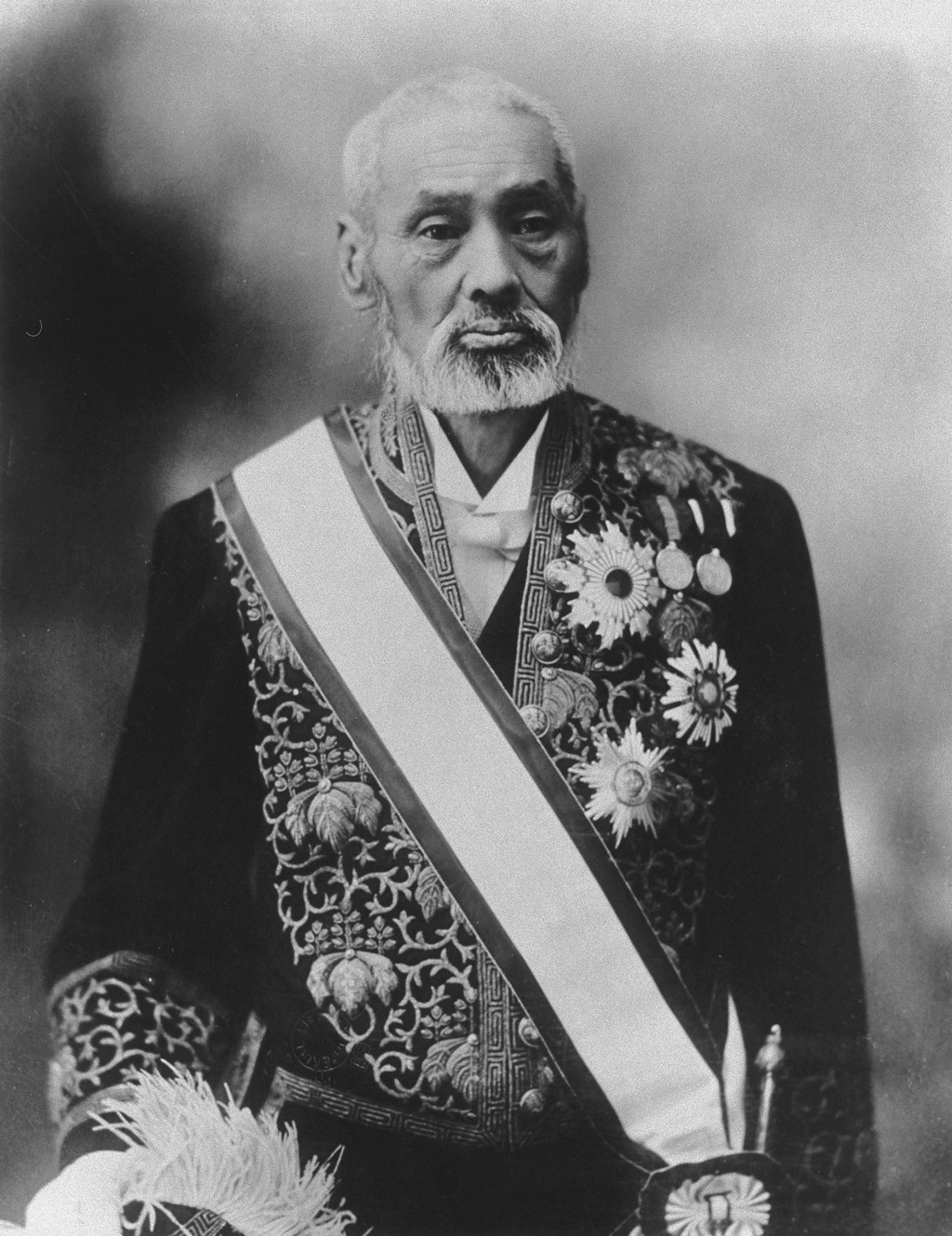

Member of the Privy Council
- In office 10 December 1906 – 9 February 1916
- Monarchs: Meiji; Taishō

Member of the House of Peers
- In office 29 September 1890 – 15 December 1906 Nominated by the Emperor

Member of the Genrōin
- In office 11 January 1886 – 19 May 1890
- In office 25 April 1875 – 28 November 1875

Personal details
- Born: 5 August 1836 Izushi, Hyōgo, Japan
- Died: 9 February 1916 (aged 79) Tokyo, Japan
- Party: Rikken Seiyūkai
- Relatives: Yamagata Isaburō (son-in-law)
- Occupation: Educator, legal scholar
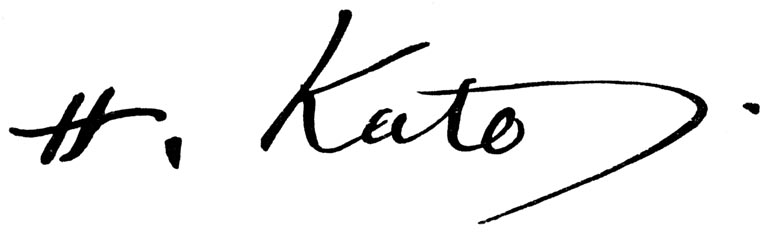
- Signature

Baron Katō Hiroyuki (加藤 弘之; 5 August 1836 – 9 February 1916) was an academic and politician of the Meiji period Japan.

== Biography ==
Katō was born on 5 August 1836, to a samurai family in Izushi domain, Tajima Province (present day Hyōgo Prefecture), and studied military science under Sakuma Shōzan and rangaku under Oki Nakamasu in Edo.

As an instructor at the Tokugawa bakufu's Bansho Shirabesho institute for researching Western science and technology from 1860 to 1868, he was one of the first Japanese to study German language and German philosophy.

After the Meiji Restoration, Katō wrote numerous theses recommending Japanese adoption of Western forms of government, especially that of a constitutional monarchy with a national assembly based on representative democracy. He joined the Rikken Seiyūkai political party, and was also a founding member of the Meirokusha intellectual society organized by Mori Arinori. A strong believer in social Darwinism, he drew parallels a democratic government and the natural order. As a member of the Genroin, he strongly supported statism, a much more authoritarian version of government against the views propounded by the Freedom and People's Rights Movement.

Katō gave lectures to the emperor each week on constitutional and international law, using translations from western texts to explain the concept of separation of powers between executive, legislative and judiciary branches of government, the history of constitutions in Europe, and various forms of local administration.

Katō served as superintendent of the Departments of Law, Science, and Literature of Tokyo Imperial University 1877–1886, and again as president 1890–1893, and was head of the Imperial Academy 1905–1909. He was also a special adviser to the Imperial Household Agency.

Katō was appointed a member of the House of Peers in 1890, and was ennobled with the title of danshaku (baron) under the kazoku peerage system in 1900. In addition, he became a Privy Councilor.

He died on 9 February 1916.

== Honours ==
From the corresponding article in the Japanese Wikipedia

- Baron - 1900
- Grand Cordon of the Order of the Sacred Treasure - December 1905.
- Grand Cordon of the Order of the Rising Sun - April 1906.
- Grand Cordon of the Order of the Paulownia Flowers - February 1916 (posthumous)
