= Meirokusha =

Organisation

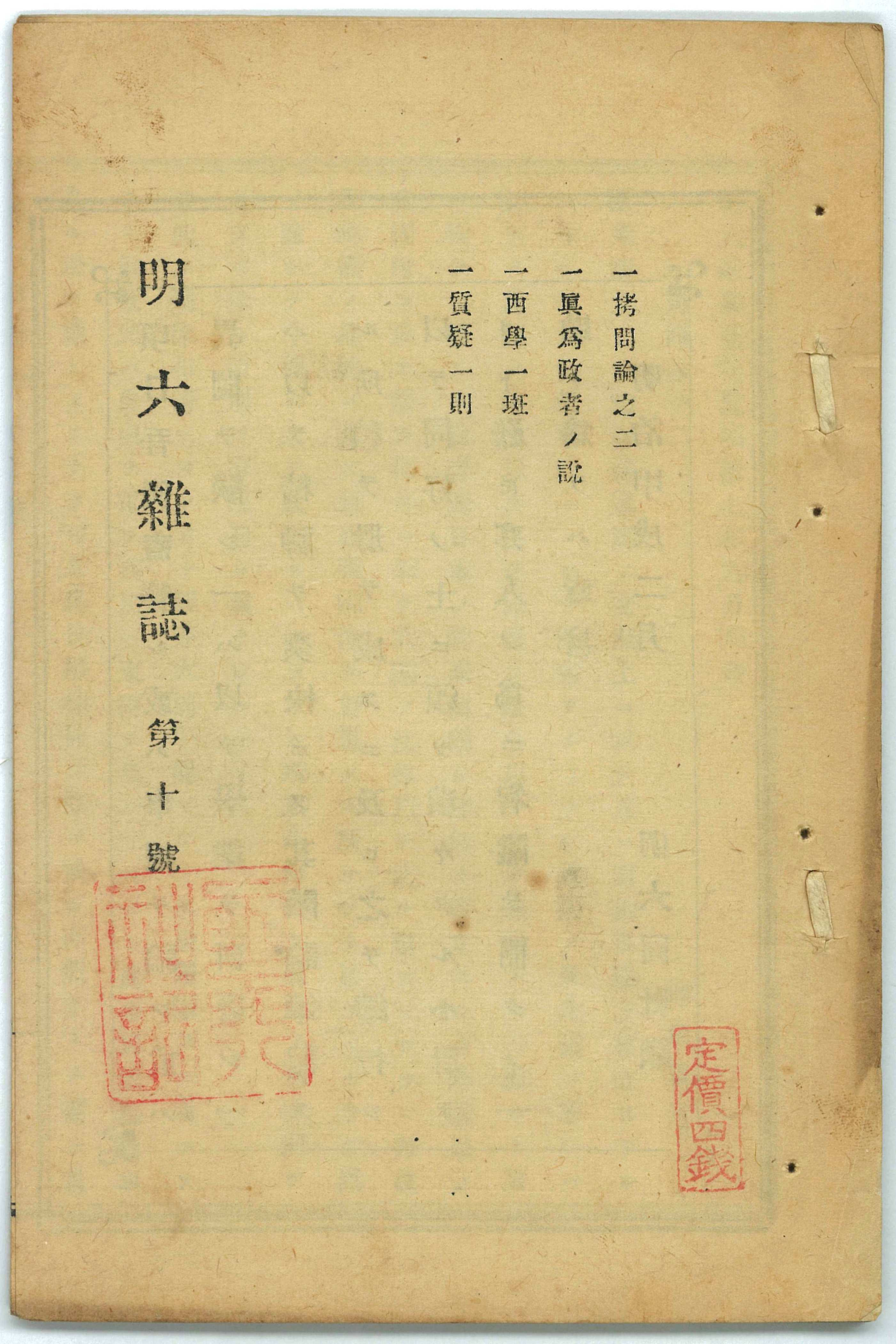
Cover of the Meiroku Zasshi, issue no. 10, 1874

The Meiji 6 Society (明六社, Meirokusha) was an intellectual society in Meiji period Japan that published social-criticism journal Meiroku zasshi (明六雑誌, "Meiroku Journal").

Proposed by statesman Mori Arinori in 1873 (six years after the Meiji Restoration) and officially formed on 1 February 1874, the Meirokusha was intended to “promote civilization and enlightenment”, and to introduce western ethics and the elements of western civilization to Japan. It played a prominent role in introducing and popularizing Western ideas during the early Meiji period, through public lectures and through its journal, the Meiroku zasshi. Mori had been impressed by the activities of American educational societies during his stint (1871-1873) as Japan's first envoy to the United States. He was also influenced by Horace Mann's views on universal education.

Its original members were Mori Arinori, Nishimura Shigeki, Fukuzawa Yukichi, Kato Hiroyuki, Mitsukuri Rinsho, Mitsukuri Shuhei, Nakamura Masanao, Nishi Amane, Tsuda Mamichi, and Sugi Koji.

The society grew to encompass a total of thirty-three members, including Sakatani Shiroshi, Kanda Takahira, Maejima Hisoka, Nagayo Sensai, Tanaka Fujimaro, Tsuda Sen, Ōtsuki Fumihiko, and William Elliot Griffis.

This membership thus included some of the most leading educators, bureaucrats, and philosophers of 19th century Japan, from a variety of backgrounds. Most had studied both Eastern Philosophy and Western Philosophy, and most had experience in living abroad. The Chinese philosophy faction felt that the strength and prosperity of the western nations was built on a foundation of moral strength, and urged that Japan follow the same path. The European philosophy faction asserted that the strength and prosperity of the western nations was due to logic, science, and rationally organized and operated organizations and institutions. The pragmatist faction held that Japan had its own unique and special strengths that needed to join with both western values and western systems of government. One of the main issues they debated was religious freedom and the ideal relationship between religion and the nation state.

Although the Meirokusha continued to function up to around 1900, the society's influence sharply declined after it was forced to cease publishing its journal following the introduction of the Press Ordinance and the Libel Law in 1875.

== Sources ==
- Meiroku Zasshi: Journal of the Japanese Enlightenment. William Reynolds Braisted, trans. Cambridge, MA: Harvard University Press, 1976.
- Hall, Ivan Parker. Mori Arinori. Massachusetts: Harvard University Press, 1973. ISBN 0-674-58730-8.
- Josephson, Jason Ānanda. The Invention of Religion in Japan. University of Chicago Press, 2012. ISBN 978-0-226-41233-7.
- Motoyama Yukihiko,"Meirokusha Thinkers and Early Meiji Enlightenment Thought," in Motoyama, Yukihiko, J. S. A Elisonas, and Richard Rubinger. Proliferating Talent : Essays on Politics, Thought, and Education in the Meiji Era. Honolulu, Hawaii: University of Hawai’i Press, 1997. Translated by George M. Wilson, Honolulu: University of Hawai'i Press, 1997. pp. 238-273.
- Tozawa Yukio. Meirokusha no Hitobito. Tsukiji Shokan, 1991, ISBN 4-8067-5690-3 (Japanese)
