= Nakamura Masanao =

Nakamura Masanao 中村 正直
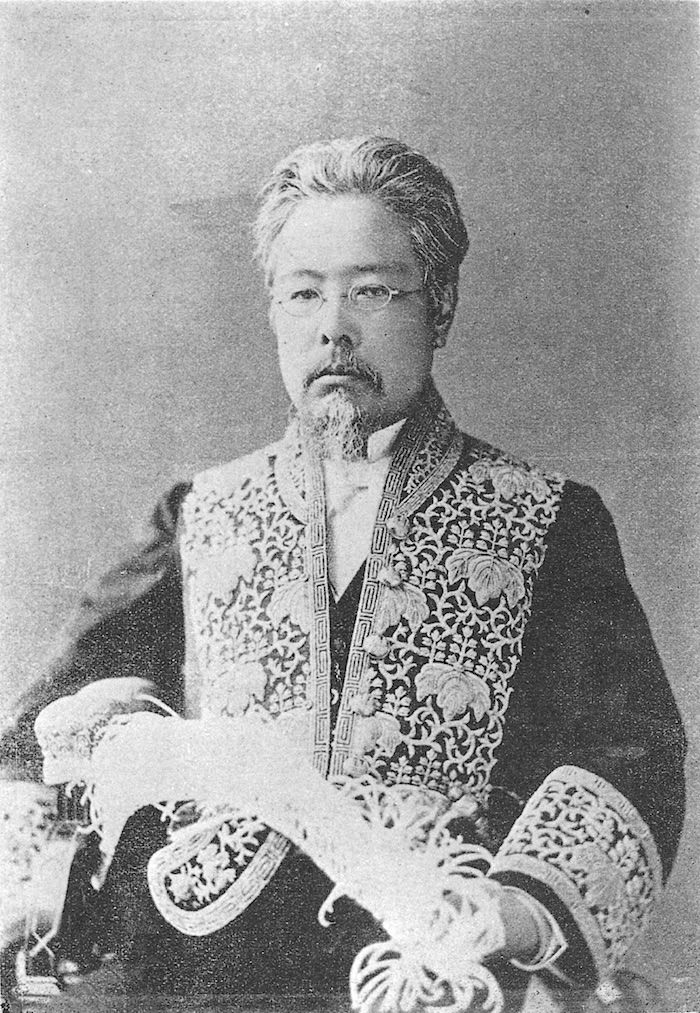
- Born: June 24, 1832; Edo, Japan
- Died: June 7, 1891 (aged 58–59)
- Occupation: Educator

Nakamura Masanao (中村 正直; 24 June 1832 – 7 June 1891) was a Japanese educator and leading figure during the Meiji period. He also went by his pen name Nakamura Keiu (中村 敬宇).

== Biography ==
Born to a samurai family in Edo, Nakamura was originally a Confucian scholar. In 1866, as an academic supervisor, he accompanied a group of 14 Tokugawa bakufu students to study in Great Britain. The downfall of the Tokugawa regime brought an early end to the students studies in London and Nakamura returned to Tokyo in June 1868.

On his return to Japan, he translated Self-Help, by Samuel Smiles, and On Liberty, by John Stuart Mill into Japanese. The two texts were published in 1871 and 1872 respectively, and proved to be tremendously popular.

He taught at the Tokyo Imperial University, founded a school, Dōjinsha, and headed what later became the Ochanomizu University. Nakamura was also noted for his promotion of educational opportunities for women and, with the help of Henry Faulds, a Scottish physician and Presbyterian missionary, establishing Rakuzen-kai, a charitable institution for the education of blind children.

Nakamura was one of the first prominent Japanese philosophers to convert to Christianity, which he tempered with Confucian humanism and belief in the innate goodness of humanity. He viewed Christianity as the foundation for the military and economic strength of the western nations, and stated that Japan needed to discard its traditional beliefs as a necessary step in strengthening the nation. In this, he was one of the more radical members of the original circle of philosophers in the Meirokusha.

He is buried in the Tendai temple Ryōgon-ji in Taitō, Tokyo.
