= Si̍t-chûn Movement =

Philosophical movement in Taiwan

Si̍t-chûn Movement (Chinese: 實存運動; Japanese: じつぞんうんどう), inasmuch as the Kyoto School, Neo-Confucianism and other prominent philosophical movements in the early-twentieth-century East Asia, is a significant philosophical movement during the Japanese colonial rule in Taiwan, in which the intellectuals in the 1920s formulated their reflections on the Taiwanese community through the western values and thoughts and wedged against the colonial domination and imperial assimilation. Si̍t-chûn Movement was intensely bond with political and cultural counter-imperialism, involving intellectuals e.g. Lin Mosei, Hung Yao-hsün, Wen Kwei Liao, Mingdian Liu, Shao-Hsing Chen, Lin Qiu-wu, Hsiang-yu Su, Shenqie Zhang, Chin-sui Hwang, Shoki Coe, Isshū Yō, C K Wu, and so forth. 'At the begin,' according to the Taiwanese cultural sociologist Ren-yi Liao (廖 仁義)'s 1988 grounding formulation, 'Taiwanese Philosophy has been a civil intellectual movement against domination, rather than an academic form of conception.' 'Si̍t-chûn Movement', however, has yet ratified and systemically studied until 2014.

Si̍t-chûn (實存) is a Taiwanese phonic understanding from the widely discussed concept 'Jitsuzon'(実存; じつぞん) in the 1930s Japanese intellectual circles; translated from 'Existenz' by Kyoto School philosopher Kuki Shūzō, this concept originated from the German Philosophy and variously adopted on the dialectics of self and the others, of master and serfdom, and sovereign beings 'Dasein'. Comparing to 'de:Existenzphilosophie', 'fr:L'existentialisme', 'Existentialism', and 'Jitsuzon', 'Si̍t-chûn' has its own intellectual and cultural understanding on the being in pursuit of counter-domination resistance and justice from its historical sediments as fragments of/f empires. This may somehow refer to Iris Marion Young's justice theory.

== Theoretical Formulation ==
Si̍t-chûn Movement is an intellectual movement on practice, which intensely bond with counter-domination during the Japan colonial rule. Such a cultural and societal movement came along with the political defeat in pursuit of parliamentary autonomy Petition Movement for the Establishment of a Taiwanese Parliament led by the Taiwanese bourgeois Chiang Wei-shui, Lin Hsien-tang and other activists against the colonial regulation Law No. 63. In 1920s, the Taiwanese Cultural Association galvanized the self-identification from the cultural and societal perspectives, through public lectures, publications, playlets and summer schools, in which intellectuals e.g. Lin Mosei, Shao-Hsing Chen, Lin Qiu-wu addressed in the public sphere; Lin Qiu-wu and Isshū Yō were involved with student movements, and even Shenqie Zhang and Hsiang-yu Su were enlisted to militia resistance. As the Kyoto School, there lies with intellectual similarity yet different understanding on Taiwan philosophical topics from Si̍t-chûn Movement philosophers.

=== Existence and Truth ===
Zeng Tianzong's 'the Principles on Truth' (真理原理論, 1937) is an enquiry of truth from phenomenological viewing. Referring to Shino Yoshinobu(志野好伸). First, he critiqued on anthropocentrism and relativism for their truth is varied with milieu; and second, he differentiated truths on 'Keisō'(形相) and 'Rinen' (理念); the former meant form and the later meant context, which could be understood by pure logic and existence; at last, he rendered that 'Keisō' and 'Rinen' could be overcoming through 'absolute-nothingness' (絕對無) and 'absolute-being' (絕對存有). The first two promulgations were originated from Husserlian Phenomenology and the last was inherited from the Kyoto School. Comparing to Zeng Tianzong's disanthropocentrism, his intellectual companion Hung Yao-hsün's 'Existence and Truth' (存在與真理, 1937) elaborated further on the being and becoming in the milieu, for formulating the Taiwanese community. The Dasein of Taiwanese could be also taken into Hung Yao-hsün's review 'View on Fūdo' (風土文化觀) on Tetsuro Watsuji and Hegelian dialectics and phenomenology. Rwei-ren Wu furtherly suggests that Hung Yao-hsün was to formulate a Formosan Phenomenology of Spirit.

=== Education and Democracy ===
British philosopher Bertrand Russell and American philosopher John Dewey visited Asia respectively in 1920/21 and whirlwinded with the intellectual circles. In 1924, Lin Mosei issued a series of 'Social Evolution and School Education' (社會之進化及學校教育) and analyzed philosophy of education from the Oriental perspective: the purpose of education is to improve human civilization and the progress underlies with intellectual reinvigoration and cultural accumulation; the former is a knowledge and thought quest beyond material life and distinguishes humans from beasts, and it also infers to a well-being society without falls. The assimilation of Japanese Empire was just the opposite: imperial ideology haunted with cultural discrimination and militarism obsession. Lin Mosei's dissertation 'Public Education in Formosa under the Japanese Administration - A Historical and Analytical Study of the Development and the Cultural Problems' (1929) elaborated from his supervisor John Dewey's horizon on education, and critique the overall public education in Taiwan under the Japanese colonial rule which suppressed the authentic language and cultural development and therefore led to discrimination. Taiwanese epistemologist Hsi-Heng Cheng(鄭喜恆) noted that 'Lin Mosei's critique on Japanese colonial rule was due to a universal value and democracy, rather than Taiwanese ethnic-nationalism sentiment.'.

=== Individual and the Community ===
Wen Kwei Liao's magnum opus 'Individual and the Community' (1933) articulated that 'how each one as an individual member is determined by his community and how he as an intellectual leader reacts upon it. That the individual is essentially a product of the community, and yet may by chance become a guide of it'. Wen Kwei Liao referred the human conduct to three factors: 'spontaneous' (instinct and drive), 'regulative' (familial and social), and 'adaptive' (conscience, sense and reflection). When an individual's inner conscience goes against the outer social domination as usual, it follows with conscience. Taiwanese epistemologist Cheng-Hung Tsai (蔡政宏) ascribes Wen Kwei Liao's moral theorem to moral institutionalism which exists with irreducible moral belief. Shao-Hsing Chen's formulation on the relation of individual and society was particularly on civil society formation from Adam Ferguson and G.W.F. Hegel. His '黑格爾市民社會論' (Hegel's Theorem on Civil Society, 1936) noted that civil society is an intermediate between family and the State, which is the center of all economic activities; however, conflicts and inequalities in the civil society seems inevitable due to different needs and desires of each member. Although Shao-Hsing Chen seemingly agreed with Hegelian idea that the state must be the intermediator reconciling conflicts and injustices, but also reckoned on John Locke's critique on absolute monarchy(which may implied the flaw of the Japanese imperialism and militantism). From Shao-Hsing Chen and Wen Kwei Liao's formulation, a Taiwanese community independent of empires seemed intellectually expected, but failed with the postwar retrocession of Chiang Kai-shek authoritarian regime, that Wen Kwei Liao exiled to Hong Kong in the 1940s and Shao-Hsing Chen flew to the US and became a sociologist on population after his doctorate in Princeton.

== Concurrence with the Kyoto School and the Neo-Confucianism ==
Some scholars of Si̍t-chûn Movement was apostles of the Kyoto School. Fa-Yu Cheng studied under Nishida Kitarō, and Chin-sui Hwang published 'On Dailiness – A Phenomenological Suggestion' (日常性について―現象學的試論) under the supervision of Tanabe Hajime. In 1928, Taihoku Imperial University was established with the Department of Literature and Politics, constituted of Risaku Mutal, Okano Ryuziro, Awano Yasutaro, Sera Hisao and other intellectual pedigrees of the Kyoto School. Hung Yao-hsün enrolled his professorship in Taihoku at that time and furtherly elaborated his conception from the Kyoto School. Kyoto Philosopher Masakatsu Fujita takes Hung Yao-hsün's philosophical significance on not merely an inheritance from Tanabe Hajime's 'species' (種) as medium but rather an existence in lifeworld, and thus he attempted to reformulate a Taiwanese community on its own historical and social formulation.

Comparing to Neo-Confucianism, Sinologist Chong-Xiu Huang (黃崇修) considered Lin Mosei to be advanced on Yangmingism studies for his comparing with Immanuel Kant, earlier than the Neo-Confucianism scholars in China e.g. Xiong Shili(zh:熊十力), Liang Shuming(zh:梁漱民)), Yifu Ma(zh:馬一浮), Carsun Chang(zh:張君勱), Feng Youlan(zh:馮友蘭).

Lin Mosei's understanding on Yangmingism, aside from Japan and China, on one hand due to his childhood education in Mandarin diverged from Meiji sinologists Inoue Tetsujirō(ja:井上哲次郎) and Kanie Yoshimaru(ja:蟹江義丸)'s interpretation from the Enlightenment perspective, on the other contemplated a more systemic study on Kant and Descartes comparison on conscience of Yangmingism 'liangzhi' than his Chinese contemporaries e.g. Liang Qichao(zh:梁啟超). Taiwanese philosophical significance which came along with particular historical experiences from the Qing magistrate to the Japanese colonial, embodied onto Lin Mosei and other Taiwanese philosophers' thoughtsystem.

	Si̍t-chûn Movement (1916)	The Kyoto School (1914)	Neo-Confucianism (1921)
Content	Formulating a Taiwanese community from the western value of education, culture, language, and politics under the colonial repression and assimilation.	Reinvigorating Yamato tradition and Jōdo spirit through the Western philosophies.	Convergence with Neo-Kantianism and Confucian tradition in face of modern crisis.
Genealogy	German Philosophy, American Pragmatism, Christian Theology.	German Philosophy, American Pragmatism, Christian Theology	German Philosophy, American Pragmatism
Background	Resistance against Japanese colonial domination	Meiji westernization to Taisho cultivation	Confucian renaissance responding to Hu Shi scientism and pragmatism since May Fourth Movement
Scholar Figures	Lin Mosei, Hung Yao-hsün, Wen Kwei Liao, Mingdian Liu, Shao-Hsing Chen, Lin Qiu-wu, Hsiang-yu Su, Shenqie Zhang, Chin-sui Hwang, Shoki Coe, Isshū Yō, C K Wu	Nishida Kitarō, Tanabe Hajime, Tetsuro Watsuji, Seiichi Hatano, Tomonaga Sanjūrō, Miki Kiyoshi, Nishitani Keiji, Shin'ichi Hisamatsu	Xiong Shili, Liang Shuming, Yifu Ma, Carsun Chang, Feng Youlan, Thomé H. Fang, Tang Chun-i, Mou Zongsan, Xu Fuguan

== Sino-Japan War and the Postwar Following ==
Si̍t-chûn Movement had hibernated from the outbreak of Sino-Japan War in 1937 accelerated the 'Japanization' assimilation to the postwar retrocession expectation from the Taiwanese civil society. Public engagement in the public sphere from Lin Mosei's 'Mingpao' (民報), Chin-sui Hwang's 'Hsin-hsin' (新新), Wen Kwei Liao and his brother Wen-yi Liao's 'Avant-garde' (前鋒), Hung Yao-hsün and Shenqie Zhang's 'New Taiwan' (新台灣) in Beijing. was temporarily revival until the February 28 Incident.

Most of Si̍t-chûn philosophers suffered for the wartime and the suppression. A philosopher of Anthropology Ming-kun Kuo and his family demised during the wartime because their cargoship from Kobe back to Taiwan was hit by an American submarine near the East China Sea. Lin Mosei was disappeared and murdered by the espionage during February 28 Incident. Dong-fang Chang was mentally ill due to the White Terror prosecution. Wen Kwei Liao, C K Wu(吳 振坤), Isshū Yō, Ai Chih Tsai, Su-Qing Lin, Shoki Coe left Taiwan. Shenqie Zhang's 'Studies on Confucianism'(孔子哲學評論) (1954) was banned and his manuscript 'Studies on Laoziism'(老子哲學評論) was also unable to publish.

Ren-yi Liao articulated that during the postwar White Terror, Taiwanese Philosophy was substituted by exogenesis Chinese Philosophy as a whole; and considered that Philosophy in Taiwan would be 'rootless' if its academic disciplines drifted apart from its position.' The 1996 Founding Proclamation of Taiwan Philosophical Association pinned on 'a civic movement on academic discourse of Taiwanese Philosophy in a various way of study and research.'. The interdisciplinary project on Taiwanese Philosophy held by Academia Sinica since 2017 has been unearthing the philosophical literature of pre-wartime Si̍t-chûn Movement and hence developed contemporary dialogues with intellectualism crisis.

== Bibliography ==
- 洪耀勳（1932），〈創造台人言語也算是一大使命〉，《台灣新民報》400號（1932 年1 月30 日）。
- 洪耀勳（1942），〈實存之有限性與形而上學之問題〉，《師大學刊》第1 輯（1942 年6 月），後收錄於《實存哲學論評》。
- 洪耀勳（1943），〈存在論之新動向〉，《師大學刊》第2 輯（1943 年6月），後收錄於氏著《實存哲學論評》，台北：水牛。。
- 洪耀勳（1948），〈基礎存在論的方法問題〉，收錄於氏著《實存哲學論評》，台北：水牛。
- 廖仁義（1988），〈台灣哲學的歷史構造─日據時期台灣哲學思潮的發生與演變〉，發表於《當代》第28 期，1988 年8 月，頁25-34，後收錄於廖仁義，《異端觀點：戰後台灣文化霸權的批判》，台北：桂冠，1990，頁17-35。
- zh:吳叡人，1999，〈祖國的辯證：廖文奎（1905-1952）臺灣民族主義思想初探〉，《思與言》，卷37，頁47-100。（重新刊載於zh:洪子偉（編），2016，《存在交涉：日治時期的臺灣哲學》，頁191-234。臺北：聯經。
- zh:吳叡人，2006，〈福爾摩沙意識型態—試論日本殖民統治下臺灣民族運動「民族文化」論述的形成（1919-1937）〉，《新史學》，卷17期2，頁127-218。
- zh:吳叡人，2016，〈Quo Vadis Formosa?：在資本主義—國家巨靈的陰影下》，《受困的思想》。臺北：衛城。
- 林巾力，2007，〈自我、他者、共同體——論洪耀勳〈風土文化觀〉，《臺灣文學研究》，期1，頁73-107。
- zh:洪子偉，2014，〈臺灣哲學盜火者－洪耀勳的本土哲學建構與戰後貢獻〉，《臺大文史哲學報》，期81，頁113-147。
- zh:洪子偉（編），2016，《存在交涉：日治時期的臺灣哲學》。臺北：聯經。
- zh:洪子偉、鄧敦民（編），2019，《啟蒙與反叛─臺灣哲學的百年浪潮》。臺北：國立臺灣大學出版中心。
- 梁家瑜，2016，〈找回我們的經典─從《存在與交涉: 日治時期的臺灣哲學》談起〉，《人本教育札記》，期327，頁38-41。
- 廖仁義，1988，〈臺灣哲學的歷史構造─日據時期臺灣哲學思潮的發生與演變〉，《當代》，期28，頁25-34。
- 藍弘岳，2016，〈想想臺灣思想史：評析《存在交涉：日治時期的臺灣哲學》〉，《臺灣社會研究季刊》，期105，頁233-250

== See also ==
- Academia Sinica, 'Taiwan Philosophy and Si̍t-chûn Movement',《Literature Archive》.
- Shao-Hsing Chen
- Hung Yao-hsün
- Chin-sui Hwang
- Wen Kwei Liao
- Li Chun sheng
- Lin Mosei
- Shenqie Zhang
- Zeng Tianzong
- Lin Qiu-wu
- Su-Qing Lin
- Isshū Yō
- Hsiang-yu Su
- Ming-kun Kuo
- Fa-Yu Cheng
