= Philosophy in Taiwan =

Philosophy in Taiwan (Chinese: 臺灣哲學) is the set of philosophical traditions in Taiwan, while Taiwanese philosophy is taken to mean philosophical work from the country. Philosophical thought in Taiwan is diverse, drawing influence from Chinese philosophy during Qing rule from the 17th and 18th century, and Western philosophy through the Kyoto School during Japanese rule in the 19th and early 20th century. Taiwanese philosophy took a more endogenous turn during the modern era, with burgeoning philosophical debate regarding Taiwanese Gemeinschaft (social relations).

== History of Taiwanese philosophy ==
The history of Taiwanese philosophy is inextricably linked with Taiwanese history. The 1895 Sino-Japanese War was not only a turning point for East-Asian realpolitik, but also East-Asian philosophy. One of the earliest works of distinctly Taiwanese philosophy is Lin Mosei's 1916 publication, Wang Yang-ming's Liangzhi (王陽明の良知說).

The history of Taiwanese philosophy can be broadly understood in distinct sections: the Indigenous Era, the Ming-Qing Han period; the Japanese Era; the postwar era and White Terror; and more contemporaneously systemic studies that have followed since the country's democratization in the 1980s.

=== Indigenous era ===
Literature on the Taiwanese indigenous peoples is scarce, and only through colloquial myths and legends can it be studied. Studies regarding the epistemology of the indigenous peoples have offered new insight on normative principles in Taiwanese philosophy.

=== Qing era ===
During the Ming and Qing imperial times, the Han Chinese settled in Taiwan in large numbers. Confucianism was imported through Han private schools and temples. Canonical Confucianism lecture scripts -- the I Ching in particular -- were ostensibly produced, however, have since been lost. The understanding of Confucianism at that time was more likely to be philology, rather than philosophy.

=== Japanese era ===
Japan gained possession of Taiwan in 1895 following the First Sino-Japanese War. This marked a turning point for the development of modern philosophy in the region. During this time Taiwan received influences from Western philosophy through the Kyoto School.

Taiwan was also influenced by the modernization of its neighbor China (May Fourth Movement), Japan (Taisho Democracy), Russia (October Revolution), and Korea (Korean Independence Movement).

Taiwanese philosophy during Japanese rule is understood by Taiwanese academics as following three distinct phases: Pre-Enlightenment (1896–1916), Enlightenment (1916–1930), and the Golden Times (1930–1945). Philosophical thought can also be divided into four camps: The Kyoto School, American Pragmatism, Christian Theology, and Modern Sinology.

==== Pre-Enlightenment (1896–1916) ====
The Presbyterian Church in Taiwan had a large impact on Taiwanese modernization during the late Qing Dynasty. Li Chunsheng was a Dadaocheng tea merchant who was baptized by the church and formulated his Christian thoughts as an opposition against Darwinism.

Lin Mosei, the first Taiwanese to receive a doctorate in the United States was educated in a Presbyterian grammar school. Rev. J. S. Chou (周再賜) was the first Taiwanese theologian in the United States and was given reverend stewardship in Japan.

Li Chunsheng published a series of Christian studies after his magum opus Zhǔ jīn xīn jí (主津新集, 1896) in Yokohama and worked on comparing his religions beliefs with Confucianism. He considered Confucius an "anonymous Christian", a concept he borrowed from theologian Karl Rahner. Taiwanese philosophy was not yet institutionalized until Lin Mosei's groundbreaking paper Wang Yang-ming's Liangzhi was published during his studies at the Tokyo Imperial University in 1916.

==== Enlightenment (1916–1930) ====
Lin Mosei analyzed Yangmingism, one of the major schools of Neo-Confucianism through Kant and Descartes.

Taiwanese philosophy was now burgeoning with the Sturm und Drang -- the institutionalization of philosophy departments in East Asia, first beginning in 1910 in Tokyo Imperial University, then further in 1912 in Kyoto University with the founding of the Kyoto School, as well as similar movements at Peking University.

Taiwanese intellectuals read broadly and were multi-cultural and multi-lingual, borrowing from Taiwanese, Japanese, English, and even French and German thought. Hung Yao-hsün, Chin-sui Hwang, and Zeng Tianzong) were among those associated with the Kyoto School and were familiar with Japanese and German languages; Lin Mosei, Joshua Liao) had their doctorates in the United States, studying and writing in English, and Joshua Liao wrote his manifesto Quo Vadis Formosa? in French. Su-Qing Lin, the first Taiwanese female scholar holding a bachelor in philosophy, published her research based on the Oeuvres de Descartes by Charles Adam and Paul Tannery in 1953.

The intellectuals trends of the day were also influential. Lin Qiu-wu’s critique of Buddhism was Marxist, and Joshua Liao's pragmatist approach on reading intellectual histories was considered pioneering.

==== Golden Times (1930–1945) ====
Significant philosophical movements took place as the Kyoto School garnered attention. Lin Mosei's 1929 dissertation Public Education in Formosa under the Japanese Administration: Historical and Analytical Study of the Development and the Cultural Problems was written under the supervision of American philosopher John Dewey and educator Paul Monroe. Adopting a pragmatist approach, Lin Mosei unveiled the injustice of the education policy under Japanese colonial rule and argued instead for universal human values like equality and liberty. Other central works include Hung Yao-hsün’s review ‘View on Fūdo’ (風土文化觀) which took influence from Tetsuro Watsuji and Hegelian dialectics and phenomenology. Shao-Hsing Chen's Hegel's Theorem on Civil Society (‘黑格爾市民社會論’) in 1936 formulated relations between the individual and society, with particular emphasis on the works of Adam Ferguson and Hegel. Zeng Tianzong’s ‘the Principles on Truth’ (真理原理論, 1937) was a phenomenological enquiry of truth. Philosophical developments ground to a halt in 1937 with outbreak of the Sino-Japanese War.

==== Four faces of Taiwanese philosophy under Japanese colonial rule ====
===== Continental philosophy =====
Taiwanese philosophers such as Hung Yao-hsün, Chin-sui Hwang, Zeng Tianzong, Fa-Yu Cheng, Shao-Hsing Chen, Isshū Yō, Shoki Coe, C. K. Wu (吳振坤) were influenced by Continental philosophy from the Kyoto School. Hung Yao-hsün came to prominence for his 1936 text Art and Philosophy (藝術と哲學) which used Wilhelm Dilthey's perspective on literature and thinking; and later in 1938 Existence and Truth – which was reviewed in Schala Nuzubidse's Theorem on Truth (存在と真理─ヌツビッゼの真理論の一考察). Shao-Hsing Chen in 1935-36 was influenced by Adam Ferguson and Hegel. Isshū Yō in 1935 published Infinite Negation and Creativity (無限否定と創造性) which drew from Henri Bergson, Martin Heidegger, and Lev Shestov, arguing that the negation of life was not identified with passiveness and nothingness. Zeng Tianzong's The Principles on Truth (真理原理論) was one of the recognized philosophical works in Japan, it was published by Risosha (東京理想社) and prefaced by Gen'yoku Kuwaki (桑木嚴翼). Shoki Coe studied philosophy in Tokyo, specializing in dialectical theology, and had his bachelor's degree in 1937. C. K. Wu of Tainan Theological College and Seminary studied with religious philosopher Seiichi Hatano during the 1940s and was later promoted in Yale University, publishing his work Philosophy of the Religion (宗教哲學, 1940). Chin-sui Hwang was an apostle of Tanabe Hajime; his 1939 On Dailiness – A Phenomenological Suggestion (日常性について―現象學的試論) contrasted the dialects of the dailiness and nightliness, and in 1959 he translated René Descartes's Discourse on the Method. Fa-Yu Cheng was supervised by Nishida Kitarō, and in 1984 he transcribed An Inquiry into the Good (善的研究) and founded empirical psychology in Taiwan.

===== American pragmatism =====
Pragmatism was an intellectual movement in 19th and 20th century America, and drew from philosophy, psychology, and education. Lin Mosei, and Hu Shih, studied under pragmatist John Dewey. Lin Mosei used a pragmatist approach in criticizing the Japanese in his Columbia University dissertation Public Education in Formosa under the Japanese Administration: Historical and Analytical Study of the Development and the Cultural Problems. Joshua Liao's dissertation The Individual and the Community on intellectual histories was influenced by George Herbert Mead's pragmatist social psychology. Hsiang-yu Su who had studied in Peking University since 1924, was influenced by the May Fourth Movement.

===== Christian theology =====
The influence of the Presbyterian church is intertwined with the intellectual history of Taiwan. Li Chun Sheng was the founder of the Presbyterian Church in Dadaocheng. His ‘Mín jiào yuānyù jiě’ (民教冤獄解, 1903), ‘Tiān yǎn lùn shū hòu’ (天演論書後, 1907), ‘Dōngxī zhé héng’ (東西哲衡, 1908) argued for the Christianity. Lin Mosei's Christian analysis of history was published on the ‘Taiwan Church News’. J. S. Chou was a son of the priest and the first Taiwanese to study theology in Kyoto and the United States and was made a reverend in Japan. Rev. Koe Bé-se (郭馬西) was recommended by the Church to Meiji Academy (Meiji Gakuin) to study theology and later went on to study at the Auburn Theological Seminary, the Union Theological Seminary in New York City (1921), and the Department of Anthropology at Columbia University (1926). Rev. Ai Chih Tsai was a graduate from a Presbyterian grammar school and founded the first Taiwanese church in Seattle, and was the first president of the Taiwanese Union. C. K. Wu revived the Tainan Theological College and Seminary with Shoki Coe. Shoki Coe was also a founder of Tunghai University.

===== Modern Sinology on Confucianism =====
Modern Sinology used western philosophy to elaborate further on Oriental philosophy. Lin Mosei, Shenqie Zhang, Ming-kun Kuo), Lin Qiu-wu, Dong-fang Chang all drew new insight into the Confucian canons. Lin Mosei's Wang Yang-ming's Liangzhi (王陽明の良知說) compared Kantian and Cartesian thought with Yangmingism. Alongside Dong-fang Chang, he lectured on Oriental philosophy and literature at the National Taiwan University. Lin Qiu-wu’s offered Marxist critique of Buddhism.

=== Postwar era and the White Terror (1945–1980) ===
Postwar retrocession from Japan was expected from the Taiwanese. Engagement in politics included Lin Mosei's Mingpao (民報), Chin-sui Hwang's Hsin-hsin (新新), Joshua Liao and his brother Thomas's Avant-garde (前鋒), Hung Yao-hsün and Shenqie Zhang's New Taiwan (新台灣). The situation took a turn after the February 28 Incident which killed thousands of civilians.

Lin Mosei was kidnapped and murdered during February 28 Incident. Dong-fang Chang spiraled into mental illness from prosecution during the White Terror, which sought the prosecution of political dissidents. Joshua Liao, witnessing corruption urged emancipation in Formosa Speaks (1950) which was written during his exile in Hong Kong.

Shenqie Zhang's Studies on Confucianism (孔子哲學評論) (1954) was notably banned, and his manuscript Studies on Laoziism (老子哲學評論) could not be published either.

Isshū Yō involved himself with the Taiwanese independence movement in Tokyo, and Shoki Coe left Taiwan but engaged with overseas Taiwanese independence movements and addressed Self-determination for Taiwanese People (臺灣人民自決運動) in 1972, and co-organized the Formosan Association for Public Affairs in 1980. C. K. Wu held his deanship of Tainan Theological College and Seminary and devoted himself to sustaining the intellectual lineage of Taiwanese philosophy.

Hung Yao-hsün introduced Existentialism into the Taiwanese intellectual circles, Chin-sui Hwang promoted the Erlanger school of constructivism; in the 1960s, Yin Haiguang introduced logical positivism and Keynesian thought. In 1958, ‘A Manifesto on the Reappraisal of Chinese Culture: Our Joint Understanding of the Sinological Study Relating to World Cultural Outlook’ was jointly addressed by Carsun Chang, Mou Zongsan, and Xu Fuguan in Hong Kong. In the meantime, Yin Haiguang, Lei Chen, and Chang Fo-chuan promoted a liberal stance in the Free China Journal; however their organization of the China Democratic Party led to prosecution from authorities. In 1972, a McCarthyist scandal occurred in the department of philosophy at the National Taiwan University.

=== Development since democratization (1980–) ===
Political reforms began the 1980s. Bookstores, salons, and soapboxes, along with mass movement, burgeoned. 15 July 1987 was a watershed moment of Taiwanese political history with the end of 38 years of military rule. The 1990s, however, remained a battlefront for civil rights. Cheng Nan-jung, a graduate from philosophy and a dissident magazine founder, argued for freed of speech, body, and mind. Taiwanese cultural sociologist Ren-yi Liao (廖仁義)’s stated that in 1988 that "Taiwanese philosophy has been a civil intellectual movement against domination, rather than an academic form of conception." Systemic research on Taiwanese philosophers from Joshua Liao, Li Chunsheng, Hung Yao-hsün included two works published in 2016 and 2019.

== See also ==
- Si̍t-chûn Movement
- Kyoto School
- New Confucianism
- Academia Sinica, ‘Taiwan Philosophy and Si̍t-chûn Movement’，《Literature Archive 》。 *中央研究院「日治臺灣哲學與實存運動」研究計畫，《日治時期臺灣哲學文獻清單列表 》.
- 中央廣播電臺，《2017 世界哲學日plus 臺灣》（2017年11月16; 17日）.
- 哲學 Cafe，《2017 被遺忘的臺灣哲學家們》（2018年4月10日）.
- 《臺灣哲學100週年學術研討會》，南港：中央研究院歐美研究所（2016年7月14; 15日）
- 臺灣大學哲學系臺灣哲學研究室，《臺灣哲學研究資料庫》.
- 民視臺灣學堂，《哲學談，淺淺地─淺談日治時期的臺灣哲學》（2017年9月22日）.
