= Tosaka =

Tosaka (written: 登坂 or 戸坂) is a Japanese surname. Notable people with the surname include:

- Eri Tosaka (登坂 絵莉; born 1993), Japanese sport wrestler
- Hiroomi Tosaka (登坂 広臣; born 1987), Japanese singer and actor
- Jun Tosaka (戸坂 潤; 1900–1945), Japanese philosopher
- Jūjirō Tosaka, Japanese politician

== See also ==
- Tōsaka
