= Thorsten Botz-Bornstein =

German philosopher (born 1964)

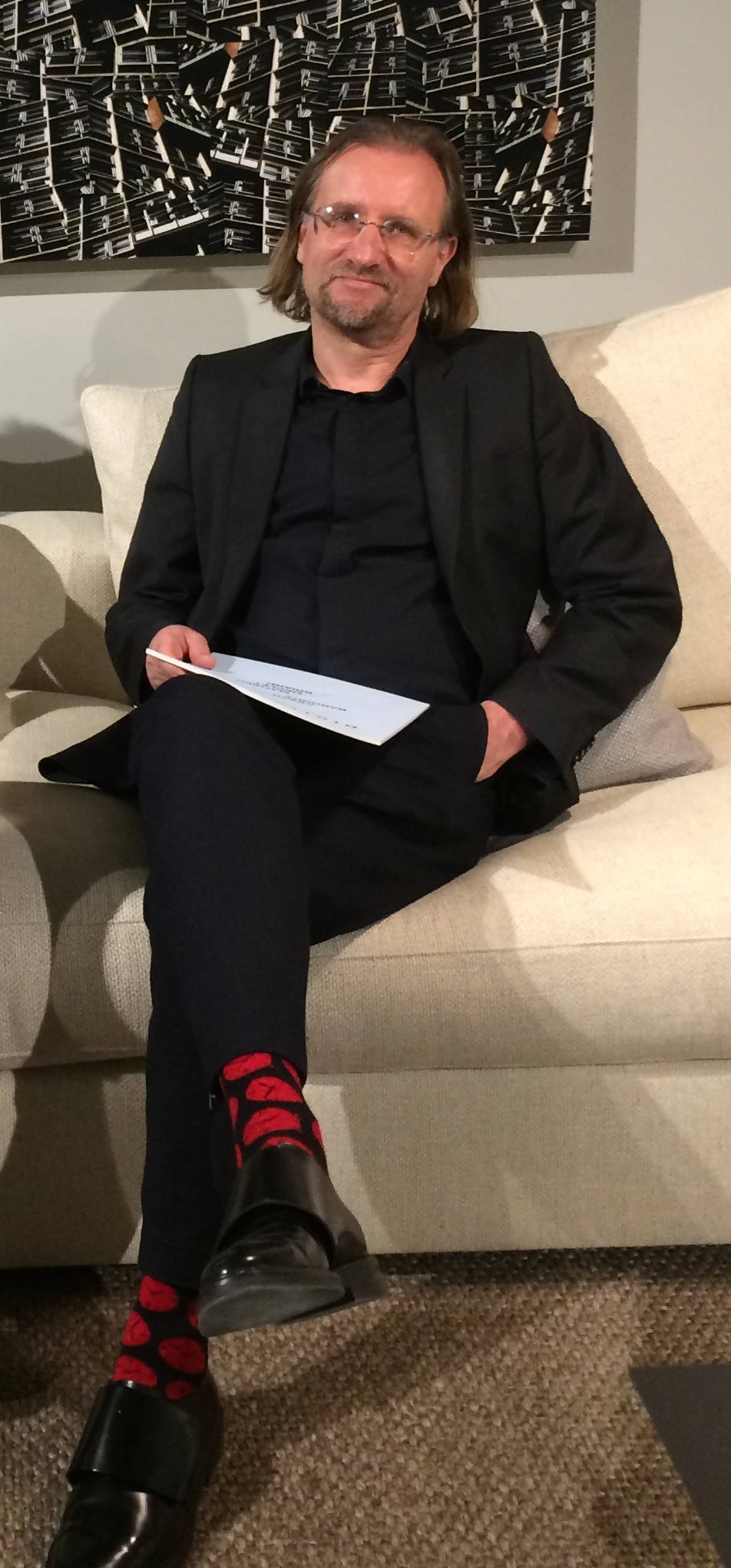
Thorsten Botz-Bornstein at the Kuwait Art Platform in 2019

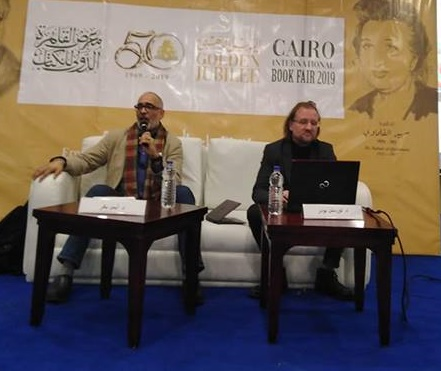
Thorsten Botz-Bornstein at the Cairo Book Fair in 2019

Thorsten Botz-Bornstein (born 1964) is a German philosopher and writer specializing in aesthetics and intercultural philosophy. From 2009 to 2026 he was professor of philosophy at the Gulf University for Science and Technology in Kuwait and director of the Global Studies Center.

== Biography ==
Botz-Bornstein was born in Duisburg in 1964. He studied philosophy at the Sorbonne in Paris (Paris I) from 1985 to 1990, where his teachers were Sarah Kofman, Francoise Dastur, and Etienne Balibar. He received a Ph.D. (D.Phil.) from Oxford University in 1993 with a thesis on "play and style." As a postdoctoral researcher based in Finland he undertook extensive research on Russian formalism and semiotics in Russia and the Baltic countries. In 2000 he received his habilitation from the EHESS in Paris. In the early 2000s, he did research for several years in Japan, in particular on the Kyoto School. He worked for the Center of Cognition of Zhejiang University (Hangzhou, China) as a consultant and researcher from 2004 to 2007. From 2007 to 2009 he was assistant professor of philosophy at Tuskegee University, a historically black university (HBCU) in Alabama, USA. From 2009 to 2026 he was professor of philosophy at Gulf University for Science and Technology in Kuwait. He is now an Associate Researcher at the Institute for Culture and Religion of Nanzan University, Japan.

== Philosophy ==
Most broadly speaking, Botz-Bornstein attempts in his philosophy to establish conceptual links between style, play, and dream. He does so by borrowing elements from non-Western philosophies (Russian, Japanese, Chinese), architecture, and the aesthetics of cinema. His philosophy is determined by an organic “play-style-dream” triangle, which he uses as a theoretical foundation in his works on aesthetics (organic space, organic style, organic architecture, organic film, etc.), intercultural communication, virtual reality, and politics. His approach can thus be described as “neo-organic." World War II experiences of totalitarianism led to the perception that any totality must be split apart or deconstructed. Botz-Bornstein's neo-organicism presents a hermeneutic alternative by rethinking synthesis and dynamic forms of holism without falling into the trap of totalitarianism. The result is a distinct philosophy of space determined by aesthetic elaborations of dreams, hermeneutics, and stylistics. In his writings on hermeneutics, Botz-Bornstein analyzes "the place of the dream" or "the place as a played phenomenon" able to evolve organically.

Linked to his central research on the phenomenon of style and play is his research on Japanese philosophy, especially those parts that are inspired by Zen Buddhism. One of Botz-Bornstein's early starting points (1992) was Kuki Shūzō’s notion of 'iki' which Botz-Bornstein interpreted as an idea related to Western elaborations of the term style. Since then, he has presented comparisons of Nishida Kitaro with various Western authors, for example Mikhail Bakhtin, Ludwig Wittgenstein and Muhammad Abduh. Other topics are Pan-Asianism, Eurasianism, Pan-Slavism, and corresponding reflections on the 'cultural sphere' and the international world order. Botz-Bornstein is also working on religion, on the idea of the 'virtual' in aesthetics, and on cultural theory as well as about meta-philosophical questions linked to ethnophilosophy. His philosophical style is determined by the continental tradition and develops in proximity with Cultural Studies.

== Publications ==
Authored Books:

Three Times Emptiness: Sunyata, Kenosis, Fana' (Springer 2025).

Conspiracy and Contingency: How to Deal with Fake Necessities (Anthem 2025)

How Much Religion is Good for Us? If Religion Were a Game (Routledge 2024)

Daoism, Dandyism, and Political Correctness (SUNY 2023)

The Philosophy of Lines: From Art Nouveau to Cyberspace (Palgrave 2021)

Micro and Macro Philosophy: Organicism in Biology, Philosophy, and Politics (Brill, 2020)

The New Aesthetics of Deculturation: Neoliberalism, Fundamentalism and Kitsch (Bloomsbury, 2019).

The Political Aesthetics of ISIS and Italian Futurism (Lexington, 2018)

Organic Cinema: Film, Architecture, and the Work of Bela Tarr (Berghahn, 2017)

Transcultural Architecture: Limits and Opportunities of Critical Regionalism (Ashgate, 2015)

Veils, Nudity, and Tattoos: The New Feminine Aesthetics (Lexington, 2015)

Virtual Reality: The Last Human Narrative? (Brill, 2015)

The Veil in Kuwait: Gender, Fashion, Identity (with N. Abdullah-Khan) (Palgrave, 2014)

La Chine contre l'Amérique. Culture sans civilisation contre civilisation sans culture? [China against America: Culture without Civilisation against Civilization without Culture?] (Paris: L'Harmattan, 2012)

Place and Dream: Japan and the Virtual (Rodopi, 2004)

Films and Dreams: Tarkovsky, Sokurov, Bergman, Kubrick, Wong Kar-wai (Lexington, 2007)

Vasily Sesemann: Experience, Formalism and the Question of Being (Rodopi, 2006)

Aesthetics and Politics of Space in Russia and Japan (Lexington, 2009)

The Cool-Kawaii: Afro-Japanese Aesthetics and New World Modernity (Lexington, 2010)

Edited Books:

Tracking Global Wokeism (Brill, 2025)

Parasite: A Philosophical Exploration (with G. Stamatellos) [on the film by Bong Joon-Ho]. (Brill, 2022)

Plotinus and the Moving Image: Neoplatonism and Film Studies (with G. Stamatellos, Brill, 2017)

Inception and Philosophy: Ideas to Die For (Chicago: Open Court, ‘Philosophy and Popular Culture Series’, 2011)

Re-ethnicizing the Minds? Tendencies of Cultural Revival in Contemporary Philosophy (Rodopi, 2006)

The Philosophy of Viagra: Bioethical Responses to the Viagrification of the Modern World (Rodopi, 2011)

Culture, Nature, Memes: Dynamic Cognitive Theories (Cambridge Scholars Press, 2008)

The Crisis of the Human Sciences: False Objectivity and the Decline of Creativity (Cambridge Scholars Press, 2012)

Literature:

The Monstrous Darkness of Tomorrow (Novella, 2018)

Kuwait 2059 (Novella, 2019)

Cyber Dorian (Novella 2021)
