= Kiyoshi Miki =

Japanese philosopher (1897–1945)

- 三木 清
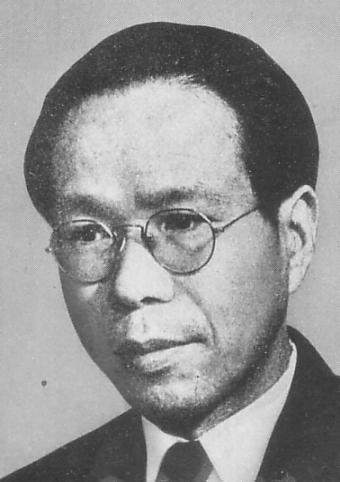
- Born: January 5, 1897; Hyōgo Prefecture, Japan
- Died: September 26, 1945 (aged 48); Nakano, Occupied Japan

Education
- Education: Kyoto Imperial University
- Academic advisor: Nishida Kitarō

Philosophical work
- Region: Japanese philosophy
- School: Kyoto School; Post-Hegelianism
- Institutions: Hōsei University
- Main interests: Tradition; humanism; philosophy of history; philosophical anthropology; dialectical materialism
- Military career
- Allegiance: Empire of Japan
- Branch: Imperial Japanese Army
- Service years: 1920, 1942
- Unit: 10th Infantry Division

Kiyoshi Miki (Japanese: 三木 清, Hepburn: Miki Kiyoshi; January 5, 1897 – September 26, 1945) was a Japanese philosopher, literary critic, scholar and university professor. He was an esteemed student of Nishida Kitarō and a prominent member of the Kyoto School.

Miki was a prolific academic and social critic of his time. He also had tense relations with both Japanese Marxism and the Imperial government at various stages of his career.

== Biography ==
Miki was born on January 5, 1897, in Isseimura, Hyōgo (now part of Tatsuno, Hyōgo). He was the eldest son of Miki Eikichi, a farmer, and his wife Shin, and was raised a devout Pure Land Buddhist. In 1910, Miki entered secondary school and went on to excel in various oratory competitions. He was admitted into the First Higher School in September 1914, where in his third year he formed a society for reading philosophical texts in Japanese. The works of Nishida Kitarō and Abe Jirō had strong influence on his choice to pursue studies in philosophy. In 1917 he met with Nishida and the following September registered in the Philosophy Department of the Faculty of Literature of Kyoto Imperial University. He began studying under Nishida and Hatano Seiichi, then in 1918 also under Tanabe Hajime. Miki wrote a wealth of poetry during this time. After graduating in 1920, Miki spent three months training in the Imperial Japanese Army, 10th Infantry Division, before returning to Kyoto Imperial University as a graduate student. While studying philosophy of history he began working as a lecturer at Ryūkoku University and Ōtani University.

In 1922 he travelled to Germany on scholarship where he studied under Heinrich Rickert in Heidelberg. Miki was in contact with over fifteen other Japanese students during his stay, including Hani Gorō, Abe Jirō, Amano Teiyū and Kuki Shūzō. In 1923 he moved to Marburg to study under Martin Heidegger, where he studied the works of Aristotle, Friedrich Schlegel, Alexander von Humboldt, Wilhelm Dilthey, Friedrich Nietzsche and Søren Kierkegaard, among others. In 1924, Miki moved again to Paris, France where he studied the works of Henri Poincaré, Hippolyte Taine, Ernest Renan and Blaise Pascal.

Miki became a contentious figure upon his return to Japan for his outspokenness and outgoing lifestyle, as well as for a controversial involvement with a widowed older woman. In 1927 he was denied a senior position at Kyoto University and was instead granted professorship at Hōsei University in Tokyo. During this time, Miki promptly engaged with Marxist theory and developed a substantial influence over Japanese workers' movements, though did not have communist leanings. He was critical of Marxist views on religion and its limited scope of natural philosophy in modern natural science. In 1928, he was engaged to Tobata Kimiko and the following year they married.

Trouble befell him when money he lent to a friend was used, unbeknown to Miki, to make illegal donations to the Japanese Communist Party. Being implicated in the development, Miki was arrested in January 1930 and held for six months, leading him to resign his post as professor. The following November, three months after the birth of his eldest daughter, he was sentenced to one year imprisonment but had the sentence deferred. The same year, members of the Puroretaria Kagaku Kenkyūjo (Proletariat Science Research Institute), including Hattori Shisō, decried Miki's academic works after which he sought to further distance himself from Marxism. While he remained in touch with his mentor, Nishida, and other members of the Kyoto School, he worked outside mainstream academia, producing popular writings aimed at a wide audience. In 1931, Miki was appointed as a Japanese representative of the International Hegel League. He became a staunch proponent of academic freedom after raising earnest criticisms of Nazi Germany and Japanese militarism. One or more of his works were banned by the government during this time.

Throughout the mid-1930s Miki regained his academic standing, forming strong collaborations with his contemporaries. Most notably he became closely associated with Jun Tosaka, a fellow student of Nishida, and remained in close contact with their mutual teacher. He wrote articles for a conservative newspaper, Yomiuri Shimbun, providing commentary on issues of the day. In 1936 his first wife died, after which he would remain unmarried for three years. In the late 1930s he was employed by the Japanese government to give a series of lectures in China and Manchuria. His firm belief that philosophy should lead politics encouraged the political activism of fellow intellectuals, and when offered in 1937, he eagerly accepted the opportunity to head the cultural division of the Shōwa Kenkyūkai (Shōwa Research Association), the brain trust of Prince Konoe Fumimaro's Shintaisei (New Order Movement). During this time Miki conceptualized the Greater East Asian Co-Prosperity Sphere though felt deeply betrayed by the Imperial Japanese Army's misuse of the doctrine, employing it in justifying aggressive expansion in China and Southeast Asia. Following the collapse of the Shōwa Kenkyūkai in 1940, Miki became isolated and depressed. During this time he continued to collaborate with fellow academics and members of the newly formed Kokumin Gakujutsu Kyōkai (Civilian Academic Society). In 1942 he served one year in the Imperial Japanese Army as a military journalist deployed in the Philippines.

His second wife Kobayashi Itoko died in 1944, after which he moved to Saitama Prefecture with his eldest son. In 1945 he was arrested again and charged with sheltering political fugitive and fellow Kyoto School thinker Takakura Teru. He was imprisoned in Sugamo Prison before being transferred to Toyotama Prison, where on September 26, 1945, he died of nephritis—40 days after the end of World War II. His death, suggested to be the result of prisoner mistreatment, caused anguish among Japanese intellectuals. Following this, the Allied Occupation pressed to have political prisoners released.

== Thought ==
Satō Nobue, a leading scholar on Miki's body of work, rejects the notion that Miki was a mere follower of Nishida, Hegel or Blaise Pascal. Instead, Miki can be seen to have an independent and eclectic approach to his work. Shoji Muramoto credits Miki as "the central figure in the Japanese humanistic movement" and the first to author a book "explicitly related to the existentialist tradition written by a Japanese thinker", his 1926 Study of the Human Being in Pascal. Miki himself writes, "one who strives for a good life is either an idealist or a humanist." His adherence to humanism throughout his works however is disputed.

Tradition was a particular preoccupation of Miki's philosophy. In maturing his thought, he came to emphasize that "the philosophy of history is the logic of historical consciousness." His conception of tradition as active, ongoing transmission by human action he contrasts with the immanent evolutionism of Hegelians and conservative traditionalists. In his 1940 essay "On Tradition", he states "a proper understanding of tradition must consist of an emphasis on both the transcendence of tradition and our active attitude toward it." Through this he stresses a unification of praxis and tradition.

Miki's thought also emphasized the nature of certain concepts in opposition, such as spoken and unspoken philosophy, nature and history, subject and object, logos and pathos, process and moment, organicism and dialectic, immanence and transcendence, and so on. His philosophy saw dialectic or the logic of imagination as the process of reconciliation between opposites, with the principal organ of this process being imagination that creates types or forms.

In response to the growing labour movements in Japan during the late 1920s, Miki published three successive books on the subject of Marxism: Modern Consciousness and the Materialist View of History (1928), Preliminary Idea of Social Science (1929), and Idealist Theory of Form (1931). During this time Miki made efforts to distinguish his own philosophy from Marxism, especially following his arrest in 1930, and remained critical of Marxism. He had been, for a time, a member of the Proletariat Science Research Institute [プロレタリア科学研究所] prior to his expulsion. Miki would however not broach Marxism again in his later works. Kenn Nakata Steffensen suggests that to consider Miki's work as either fascist or Marxist is incorrect, stating that it stands in critique of liberalism, Marxism, nationalism and idealism.

Miki developed a reading of Heidegger's early philosophy as essentially being in the tradition of Christian individualism, reaching back to Saint Augustine and being fundamentally anti-Greek in character. As such, his reading of Heidegger falls with the broad class as Jean-Paul Sartre, in that it ignores the priority Heidegger gives to the ontological question of Being, in favor of seeing Heidegger's philosophy as an analysis of human existence.

The German writer Johann Wolfgang von Goethe was influential in his intellectual development.

== List of works ==
=== Monographs ===
- Study of the Human Being in Pascal [パスカルにおける人間の研究] (Tokyo: Iwanami Shoten [岩波書店], 1926).

Ch. 1 - The Analysis of the Human Being [人間の分析]
Ch. 2 - The Wager [賭]
Ch. 3 - Discourse on the Passion of Love [愛の情念に関する説]
Ch. 4 - The Three Orders [三つの秩序]
Ch. 5 - Method [方法]
Ch. 6 - The Religious Interpretation of Life [宗教における生の解釈]

- Modern Consciousness and the Materialist View of History [唯物史観と現代の意識] (Tokyo: Iwanami Shoten [岩波書店], 1928).

Ch. 1 - The Marxian Form of Anthropology [人間学のマルクス的形態]
Ch. 2 - Marxism and Materialism [マルクス主義と唯物論]
Ch. 3 - The Philosophies of Pragmatism and Marxism [プラグマチズムとマルキシズムの哲学]
Ch. 4 - Hegel and Marx [ヘーゲルとマルクス]

- Preliminary Idea of Social Science [社会科学の予備概念] (Tokyo: Tettō Sho’in [鉄塔書院], 1929).

Ch. 1 - The Structure of Inquiry [問の構造]
Ch. 2 - The Basic Idea of Hermeneutical Phenomenology [解釈学的現象学の基礎概念]
Ch. 3 - The Task of Scientific Critique [科学批判の課題]
Ch. 4 - Theory, History, Policy [理論歴史政策]
Ch. 5 - Organicism and Dialectic [有機体説と弁証法]
Ch. 6 - Materialism and Its Actual Form [唯物論とその現実形態]

- Problems of the Idealist Philosophy of History [史的観念論の諸問題] (Tokyo: Iwanami Shoten [岩波書店], 1929).

Ch. 1 - Critical Philosophy and the Philosophy of History [批判哲学と歴史哲学]
Ch. 2 - The Problem of Historical Causality [歴史的因果律の問題]
Ch. 3 - The Problem of Individuality [個性の問題]
Ch. 4 - Dilthey’s Hermeneutics [ディルタイの解釈学]
Ch. 5 - Hegel’s Philosophy of History [ヘーゲルの歴史哲学]
Ch. 6 - Logical Consciousness During Crisis [危機における論理的意識]

- Idealist Theory of Form [観念形態論] (Tokyo: Tettō Sho’in [鉄塔書院], 1931).

Ch. 1 - Historicism and History [歴史主義と歴史]
Ch. 2 - The Structure of Epistemology [認識論の構造]
Ch. 3 - Formalist Logic and Dialectic [形式論理学と弁証法]
Ch. 4 - Limitation and Progress of the Development of Science [科学の発展の制限とその飛躍]
Ch. 5 - The Social Determinateness of Natural Science [自然科学の社会的規定性]
Ch. 6 - A Theory of Enlightenment Literature [啓蒙文学論]
Ch. 7 - Artistic Value and Political Value [芸術的価値と政治的価値]
Ch. 8 - A Theory of Literary Form [文学形態論]

- Philosophy of History [歴史哲学] (Tokyo: Iwanami Shoten [岩波書店], 1932).

Ch. 1 - The Idea of History [歴史の概念]
Ch. 2 - The Historicity of Being [存在の歴史性]
Ch. 3 - Historical Development [歴史的発展]
Ch. 4 - Historical Time [歴史的時間]
Ch. 5 - The Structure of Views of History [史観の構造]
Ch. 6 - Historical Knowledge [歴史的認識]

- Position of the Human Being During Crisis [危機における人間の立場] (Tokyo: Tettō Sho’in [鉄塔書院], 1933).

Ch. 1 - A Philosophical Account of Crisis Consciousness [危機意識の哲学的解明]
Ch. 2 - An Ontological Account of the Dialectic [弁証法の存在論的解明]
Ch. 3 - The Problem of Metaphysics’s Future Prospects [形而上学の将来性の問題]
Ch. 4 - A Theory of the Composition of Worldviews [世界観構成の理論]
Ch. 5 - The Forms of Social Knowledge [社会的知識の諸形態]
Ch. 6 - Ideology and Pathology [イデオロギーとパトロギー]
Ch. 7 - The Physiology and Pathology of Literary Criticism [批評の生理と病理]
Ch. 8 - Today’s Ethical Problems and Literature [今日の倫理の問題と文学]
Ch. 9 - Anxious Thinking and Its Overcoming [不安の思想とその超克]

- Anthropological Theory of Literature [人間学的文学論] (Tokyo: Kaizōsha [改造社], 1934).

Ch. 1 - The Problem of Generations in Literature [文学における世代の問題]
Ch. 2 - Literature and the Problem of Neo-Humanism [ネオヒューマニズムの問題と文学]
Ch. 3 - The Spirit of Rhetoric [レトリックの精神]
Ch. 4 - Historical Consciousness and Mythical Consciousness [歴史的意識と神話的意識]
Ch. 5 - Observations on Poetry and Song [詩歌の考察]
Ch. 6 - Ethics and the Human Being [倫理と人間]
Ch. 7 - Heidegger and Philosophy’s Fate [ハイデッガーと哲学の運命]
Ch. 8 - The Human Being and the State in Spinoza [スピノザにおける人間と国家]
Ch. 9 - Nature and History in Goethe [ゲーテにおける自然と歴史]

- Aristotle’s Metaphysics [アリストテレス形而上学] (Tokyo: Iwanami Shoten [岩波書店], 1935).

Ch. 1 - The Definition of Learning [学の規定]
Ch. 2 - Method [方法]
Ch. 3 - The Subject of the Metaphysics [形而上学の主題]
Ch. 4 - Being as Truth [真としての存在]
Ch. 5 - The Concept of Existence [実有の概念]
Ch. 6 - Potentiality and Actuality [可能性と現実性]

- Times and Morality [時代と道徳] (Tokyo: Sakuhinsha [作品社], 1936).
- Aristotle [アリストテレス] (Tokyo: Iwanami Shoten [岩波書店], 1938).

[Part of the Great Theorists of Education [大教育家文庫] series.]
Ch. 1 - The Fundamentals of Education [教育の基礎]
Ch. 2 - The Aim of Education [教育の目的]
Ch. 3 - Education and Society [教育と社会]
Ch. 4 - The Educational Curriculum [教育の課程]

- Socrates [ソクラテス] (Tokyo: Iwanami Shoten [岩波書店], 1939).
- Records of the Present Age [現代の記録] (Tokyo: Sakuhinsha [作品社], 1939).
- Logic of Imagination, Vol. 1 [構想力の論理 第一] (Tokyo: Iwanami Shoten [岩波書店], 1939).

Ch. 1 - Myth [神話]
Ch. 2 - Institution [制度]
Ch. 3 - Technology [技術]

- Introduction to Philosophy [哲学入門] (Tokyo: Iwanami Shoten [岩波書店], 1940).

Ch. 1 - The Problem of Knowledge [知識の問題]
Ch. 2 - The Problem of Action [行為の問題]

- Notes on Philosophy, Vol. 1 [哲学ノート] (Tokyo: Kawade Shobō [河出書房], 1941).
- Learning and Life [学問と人生] (Tokyo: Chūō Kōronsha [中央公論社], 1942).

Ch. 1 - A Theory of Learning [学問論]
Ch. 2 - A Theory of Reading [読書論]
Ch. 3 - A Theory of Being Cultured [教養論]
Ch. 4 - On Science [科学について]
Ch. 5 - On Eloquence [雄弁について]
Ch. 6 - The Reconstruction of Intelligence [知性の改造]
Ch. 7 - On Shestovian Anxiety [シェストフ的不安について]
Ch. 8 - On the Active Human Being [行動的人間について]
Ch. 9 - Nietzsche and Contemporary Thought [ニーチェと現代思想]
Ch. 10 - Anxious Thinking and Its Overcoming [不安の思想とその超克]

[Same as Ch. 9 of Position (1933) above.]

Ch. 11 - Human Reproduction and the Task of Culture [人間再生と文化の課題]
Ch. 12 - The Reconstruction of National Character [国民性の改造]
Ch. 13 - To the Youthful Intellectual Class [青年知識層に与う]

- Notes on Philosophy, Vol. 2 [続哲学ノート] (Tokyo: Kawade Shobō [河出書房], 1942).
- Reading and Life [読書と人生] (Tokyo: Oyama Shoten [小山書店], 1942). [RL]

Ch. 1 - My Youth [我が青春]
Ch. 2 - A History of My Reading [読書遍歴]
Ch. 3 - How to Study Philosophy [哲学はどう学んでゆくか]
Ch. 4 - Can Philosophy Be Made Accessible? [哲学はやさしくできないか]
Ch. 5 - How to Read [如何に読書すべきか]
Ch. 6 - The Ethics of Books [書物の倫理]
Ch. 7 - The Contempt for Translation [軽蔑された翻訳]
Ch. 8 - The Objectivity of Dictionaries [辞書の客観性]
Ch. 9 - Reminiscences of Professor Heidegger [ハイデッゲル教授の思い出]
Ch. 10 - On Professor Nishida [西田先生のことども]
Ch. 11 - Some News from Me [消息一通]

- Philosophy of Technology [技術哲学] (Tokyo: Iwanami Shoten [岩波書店], 1942).

[Originally published in 1938 as part of the Iwanami Kōza: Rinrigaku series.]
Ch. 1 - The Essence of Technology [技術の本質]
Ch. 2 - Technology and Society [技術と社会]
Ch. 3 - Technology and Morality [技術と道徳]
Ap. 1 - The Principle Behind the Study of Technology [技術学の理念]
Ap. 2 - Technology and the New Culture [技術と新文化]

- Methodology of Literary History [文学史方法論] (Tokyo: Iwanami Shoten [岩波書店], 1946).

[Originally published in 1932 as part of the Iwanami Kōza: Sekai Bungaku series.]
Ch. 1 - The Scientific Method [科学的方法]
Ch. 2 - Literary Criticism and History [批評と歴史]
Ch. 3 - The Psychological Method [精神科学的方法]
Ch. 4 - Form and Law [形態と法則]
Ch. 5 - Literature and Daily Life [文学と生活]

- Notes on the Theory of Life [人生論ノート] (Osaka: Sōgensha [創元社], 1947).
- Philosophy of Knowledge [知識哲学] (Tokyo: Oyama Shoten [小山書店], 1948).

Ch. 1 - Being and Truth [存在と真理]
Ch. 2 - Intuition and Judgement [直観と判断]
Ch. 3 - Subject and Object [主観と客観]
Ch. 4 - Knowledge and Life [認識と生]
Ch. 5 - Epistemology [認識論]
Ap. 1 - Bolzano’s ‘Propositions in Themselves’ [ボルツァーノの「命題自体」]

[»Sätze an sich«.]

Ap. 2 - Logic and Intuition [論理と直観]

- Logic of Imagination, Vol. 2 [構想力の論理 第二] (Tokyo: Iwanami Shoten [岩波書店], 1948).

[Continued from Vol. 1 above. Unfinished at the time of Miki’s death.]
Ch. 4 - Experience [経験]

- Philosophy and Life [哲学と人生] (Tokyo: Kawade Shobō [河出書房], April 1950).

=== Translations ===
- Karl Marx and Friedrich Engels, The German Ideology [ドイッチェ・イデオロギー] (Tokyo: Iwanami Shoten [岩波書店], 1930).
- René Descartes, Meditations [省察] (Tokyo: Iwanami Shoten [岩波書店], 1949).

=== Collected Works ===
Collected Works [三木清全集], 20 Vols. (Tokyo: Iwanami Shoten [岩波書店], 1966–86). [CW]

CW1:

- Study of the Human Being in Pascal [パスカルにおける人間の研究] (Tokyo: Iwanami Shoten [岩波書店], 1926), reprinted in CW1:1-191.
- Notes on the Theory of Life [人生論ノート] (Osaka: Sōgensha [創元社], 1947), reprinted in CW1:193-361.
- ‘My Youth’ [我が青春] (Miyako Shimbun [都新聞], 18–19 January 1941), reprinted in RL and CW1:363-7.
- ‘A History of My Reading’ [読書遍歴] (Bungei [文芸], June 1941–January 1942), reprinted in RL and CW1:369-431.
- ‘Some News from Me’ [消息一通] (Shisō [思想], March 1924), reprinted in RL and CW1:433-449.
- ‘How to Study Philosophy’ [哲学はどう学んでゆくか] (Tosho [図書], March–May 1941), reprinted in RL and CW1:451-75.
- ‘Can Philosophy Be Made Accessible?’ [哲学はやさしくできないか] (Tettō [鉄塔], July 1932), reprinted in RL and CW1:477-87.

CW3:

- Modern Consciousness and the Materialist View of History [唯物史観と現代の意識] (Tokyo: Iwanami Shoten [岩波書店], 1928), reprinted in CW3:1-155.
- Preliminary Idea of Social Science [社会科学の予備概念] (Tokyo: Tettō Sho’in [鉄塔書院], 1929), reprinted in CW3:157-365.
- Idealist Theory of Form [観念形態論] (Tokyo: Tettō Sho’in [鉄塔書院], 1931), reprinted in CW3:367-521.

CW6:

- Philosophy of History [歴史哲学] (Tokyo: Iwanami Shoten [岩波書店], 1932), reprinted in CW6:1-287.
- ‘Outline of Social Science’ [社会科学概論] (Iwanami Kōza: Tetsugaku [岩波講座 哲学], April–August 1932), reprinted in CW6:289-453.

CW8:

- Logic of Imagination [構想力の論理] (Tokyo: Iwanami Shoten [岩波書店], 1939–48), reprinted in CW8:1-509.

CW9:

- ‘Aristotle’ [アリストテレス] (Iwanami Kōza: Sekai Shichō [岩波講座 世界思潮], March 1929), reprinted in CW9:1-27.
- Aristotle’s Metaphysics [アリストテレス] (Tokyo: Iwanami Shoten [岩波書店], 1935), reprinted in CW9:29-177.
- Aristotle [アリストテレス] (Tokyo: Iwanami Shoten [岩波書店], 1938), reprinted in CW9:179-305.
- Socrates [ソクラテス] (Tokyo: Iwanami Shoten [岩波書店], 1939), reprinted in CW9:307-447.

CW10: Philosophical Reviews [哲学評論]

CW11: Essays on Literature [文学論稿]

CW12: Literary Reviews [文学評論]

CW13: Essays, Vol. 1: Religion, Education and Culture [評論1 宗教・教養と文化]

CW14: Essays, Vol. 2: Religion, Education and Culture [評論2 宗教・教養と文化]

CW15: Essays, Vol. 3: Society and Politics [評論3 社会・時局]

== See also ==
- Japanese dissidence in 20th-century Imperial Japan
