= Takakura =

Takakura (jap. 高倉, lit. "tall storehouse") may refer to:

- Takakura, elevated Japanese storehouses
- Emperor Takakura (1161–1181), emperor of Japan
- Teru Takakura (1891–1986), Japanese writer and politician
- Ken Takakura (1931–2014), Japanese actor
- Ken Takakura, main character from the manga and anime series Dandadan
- Miki Takakura (born 1960), Japanese actress
- Takakura family, a branch of the Japanese Fujiwara clan
- Takakura (2003, September 12), a game character in Harvest Moon: A Wonderful Life
