= Lin Tsung-yi =

Taiwanese academic and educator in psychiatry

Lin Tsung-yi 林宗義
- Born: 19 September 1920; Tainan, Taiwan
- Died: 20 July 2010 (aged 89)
- Education: University of Tokyo (MD)

Lin Tsung-yi (Taiwanese: Lîm Chong-gī, Chinese: 林宗義; pinyin: Lín Zōngyì; Wade–Giles: Lin^{2} Tsung^{1}-yi^{4}; 19 September 1920 – 20 July 2010) was a Taiwanese academic and educator in psychiatry.

== Early life and education ==
Lin was born in 1920 in Tainan Prefecture, Japanese Taiwan (modern-day Tainan, Taiwan) to Lin Mosei and Chai-Hwang Wang. Like his parents, he studied in Japan, graduating from the School of Medicine at Tokyo Imperial University (now University of Tokyo) in 1943. He did postgraduate training at Harvard Medical School and the Institute of Psychiatry at Maudsley Hospital.

== Career ==
Lin was Honorary President of the World Federation for Mental Health. He was a director of the psychiatric department and an adviser of psychiatric studies at the World Health Organization.

He held professorships in psychiatry at the National Taiwan University, University of Michigan, University of British Columbia. His father, Lin Mosei, was an educator and a victim of the February 28 Incident in Taiwan. In late 1980s, Lin was one of the initiators of the February 28 Incident Peace and Justice Movement.

== Publications ==
- Lin, Tsung-yi, ed. (1999). An Introduction to the 2-28 Tragedy in Taiwan: For World Citizens. Taipei, Taiwan: Taiwan Renaissance Foundation Press. ISBN 9579729204.
- Lin, Tsung-yi; Eisenberg, Leon, eds. (1985). Mental Health Planning for One Billion People: A Chinese Perspective. Vancouver: University of British Columbia Press. ISBN 9780774802338.
- Kleinman, Arthur; Lin, Tsung-yi, eds. (1980). Normal and Abnormal Behavior in Chinese Culture. Dordrecht: Boston. ISBN 9789027711045.
