= Shizuteru Ueda =

Japanese philosopher (1926–2019)

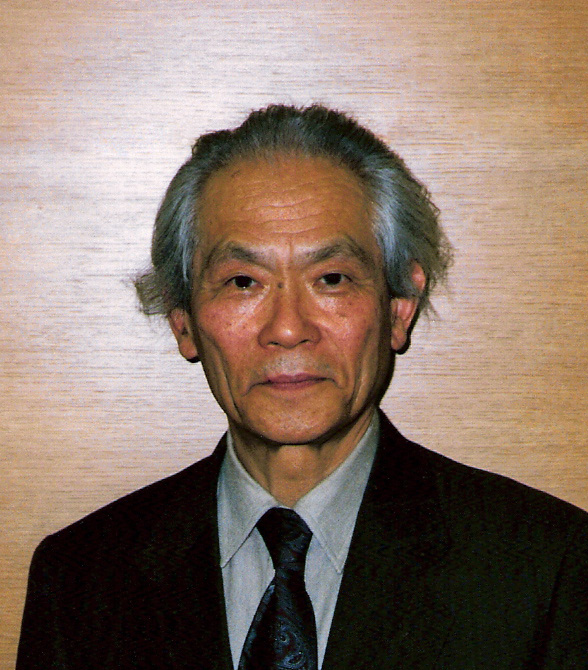
- Born: January 17, 1926; Tokyo, Japan
- Died: June 28, 2019 (aged 93)

Education
- Education: University of Marburg; Kyoto University

Philosophical work
- Era: 20th-century philosophy
- Region: Japanese philosophy
- School: Kyoto School
- Institutions: Kyoto University
- Main interests: Buddhism, Zen, philosophy of religion

Shizuteru Ueda (上田 閑照, Ueda Shizuteru; January 17, 1926 − June 28, 2019) was a Japanese philosopher specialized in philosophy of religion, especially in philosophy of Buddhism and Zen. He was a professor at Kyoto University and considered a third generation member of Kyoto School (京都学派, Kyoto-gakuha).

== Biography ==
Shizuteru Ueda was born in Tokyo, Japan.

As the son of a Buddhist priest, he studied philosophy at Kyoto University where his mentor Keiji Nishitani oriented his studies toward medieval mystics.

He then went to Germany and received a Ph.D. degree from the University of Marburg with a thesis on the Western Christian mystic, Meister Eckhart. He returned to Kyoto University to teach philosophy of religion. In 1976, He was awarded a Doctor of Letters (文学博士, Bungaku-Hakushi).

He later focused on the thought of Kitarō Nishida. Being a Zen practitioner, Ueda—like Nishida—studied Zen Buddhism under the philosophical categories of Western philosophy. He is considered a third generation member of Kyoto School.

== Family ==
- His wife is Maniko Ueda (上田真而子, Maniko Ueda), who is a Japanese literary specialized in German literature.

== Bibliography ==
- Die Gottesgeburt in der Seele und der Durchbruch zur Gottheit. Die mystische Anthropologie Meister Eckharts und ihre Konfrontation mit der Mystik des Zen-Buddhismus. Mohn, Güterloh 1965.
- Zen y filosofia, Barcelona: Herder, 2004.
