= Shin'ichirō Tomonaga =

Japanese physicist (1906-1979)

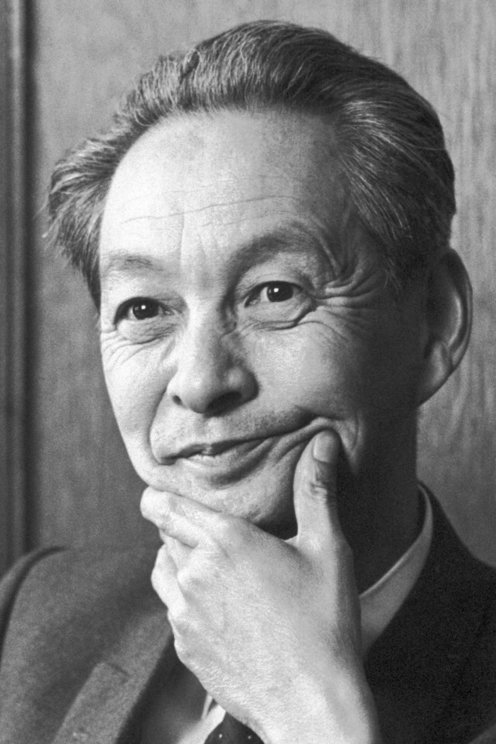
- Tomonaga in 1965
- Born: March 31, 1906; Tokyo, Japan
- Died: July 8, 1979 (aged 73); Tokyo, Japan
- Education: Kyoto Imperial University
- Known for: Quantum electrodynamics Schwinger–Tomonaga equation Tomonaga–Luttinger liquid
- Father: Tomonaga Sanjūrō
- Awards: Asahi Prize (1946); Lomonosov Gold Medal (1964); Nobel Prize in Physics (1965)
- Scientific career
- Fields: Theoretical physics
- Workplaces: Leipzig University; Institute for Advanced Study; Tokyo University of Education; RIKEN; University of Tokyo

Shinichiro Tomonaga (朝永 振一郎, Tomonaga Shin'ichirō; March 31, 1906 – July 8, 1979), usually cited as Sin-Itiro Tomonaga in English, was a Japanese physicist. He shared the 1965 Nobel Prize in Physics with Richard Feynman and Julian Schwinger "for their fundamental work in quantum electrodynamics (QED), with deep-ploughing consequences for the physics of elementary particles".

== Biography ==
Tomonaga was born in Tokyo in 1906. He was the second child and eldest son of a Japanese philosopher, Tomonaga Sanjūrō. He entered the Kyoto Imperial University in 1926. Hideki Yukawa, also a Nobel laureate, was one of his classmates during undergraduate school. During graduate school at the same university, he worked as an assistant in the university for three years. In 1931, after graduate school, he joined Nishina's group in RIKEN. In 1937, while working at Leipzig University (Leipzig), he collaborated with the research group of Werner Heisenberg. Two years later, he returned to Japan due to the outbreak of the Second World War, but finished his doctoral degree (Dissertation PhD from University of Tokyo) on the study of nuclear materials with his thesis on work he had done while in Leipzig.

In Japan, he was appointed to a professorship in the Tokyo University of Education (a forerunner of Tsukuba University). During the war he studied the magnetron, meson theory, and his super-many-time theory. In 1948, he and his students re-examined a 1939 paper by Sidney Dancoff that attempted, but failed, to show that the infinite quantities that arise in quantum electrodynamics (QED) can be canceled with each other. Tomonaga applied his super-many-time theory and a relativistic method based on the non-relativistic method of Wolfgang Pauli and Fierz to greatly speed up and clarify the calculations. Then he and his students found that Dancoff had overlooked one term in the perturbation series. With this term, the theory gave finite results; thus Tomonaga discovered the renormalization method independently of Julian Schwinger and calculated physical quantities such as the Lamb shift at the same time.

In 1949, he was invited by Robert Oppenheimer to work at the Institute for Advanced Study in Princeton. He studied a many-body problem on the collective oscillations of a quantum-mechanical system. In the following year, he returned to Japan and proposed the Tomonaga–Luttinger liquid. In 1955, he took the leadership in establishing the Institute for Nuclear Study, University of Tokyo. In 1965, he was awarded the Nobel Prize in Physics, with Julian Schwinger and Richard P. Feynman, for the study of QED, specifically for the discovery of the renormalization method. He died of throat cancer in Tokyo in 1979.

Tomonaga was married in 1940 to Ryōko Sekiguchi. They had two sons and one daughter. He was awarded the Order of Culture in 1952, and the Grand Cordon of the Order of the Rising Sun in 1976.

In recognition of three Nobel laureates' contributions, the bronze statues of Shin'ichirō Tomonaga, Leo Esaki, and Makoto Kobayashi was set up in the Central Park of Azuma 2 in Tsukuba City in 2015.

== Recognition ==
- 1946 – Asahi Prize
- 1948 – Japan Academy Prize
- 1951 – Member of the Japan Academy
- 1952 – Order of Culture
- 1964 – Lomonosov Gold Medal
- 1965 – Nobel Prize in Physics
- 1965 – elected to the United States National Academy of Sciences
- 1966 – elected to the American Philosophical Society
- 1967 – Grand Cordon of the Order of the Rising Sun
- 1975 – elected to the American Academy of Arts and Sciences

== Selected publications ==
=== Books ===
- Tomonaga, Sin-Itiro (1997). The Story of Spin. Oka, Takeshi (trans.). University of Chicago Press. ISBN 0-226-80794-0.

=== Articles ===
- Tomonaga, S. "On a Relativistically Invariant Formulation of the Quantum Theory of Wave Fields." Prog. Theor. Phys. 1, 27–42 (1946).
- Koba, Z., Tati, T. and Tomonaga, S. "On a Relativistically Invariant Formulation of the Quantum Theory of Wave Fields. II." Prog. Theor. Phys. 2, 101–116 (1947).
- Koba, Z., Tati, T. and Tomonaga, S. "On a Relativistically Invariant Formulation of the Quantum Theory of Wave Fields. III." Prog. Theor. Phys. 2, 198–208 (1947).
- Kanesawa, S. and Tomonaga, S. "On a Relativistically Invariant Formulation of the Quantum Theory of Wave Fields. IV." Prog. Theor. Phys. 3, 1–13 (1948).
- Kanesawa, S. and Tomonaga, S. "On a Relativistically Invariant Formulation of the Quantum Theory of Wave Fields. V." Prog. Theor. Phys. 3, 101–113 (1948).
- Koba, Z. and Tomonaga, S. "On Radiation Reactions in Collision Processes. I." Prog. Theor. Phys. 3, 290–303 (1948).
- Tomonaga, S. and Oppenheimer, J. R. "On Infinite Field Reactions in Quantum Field Theory." Phys. Rev. 74, 224–225 (1948).

== See also ==
- List of Japanese Nobel laureates
- List of Nobel laureates affiliated with Kyoto University
- List of Nobel laureates affiliated with the University of Tokyo
