= Kuki Ryūichi =

Japanese politician and samurai

Kuki Ryūichi

Baron Kuki Ryūichi (九鬼 隆一; September 12, 1852 – August 18, 1931) was a Japanese politician and samurai. He is best known as the father of philosopher Kuki Shūzō.

== Life ==
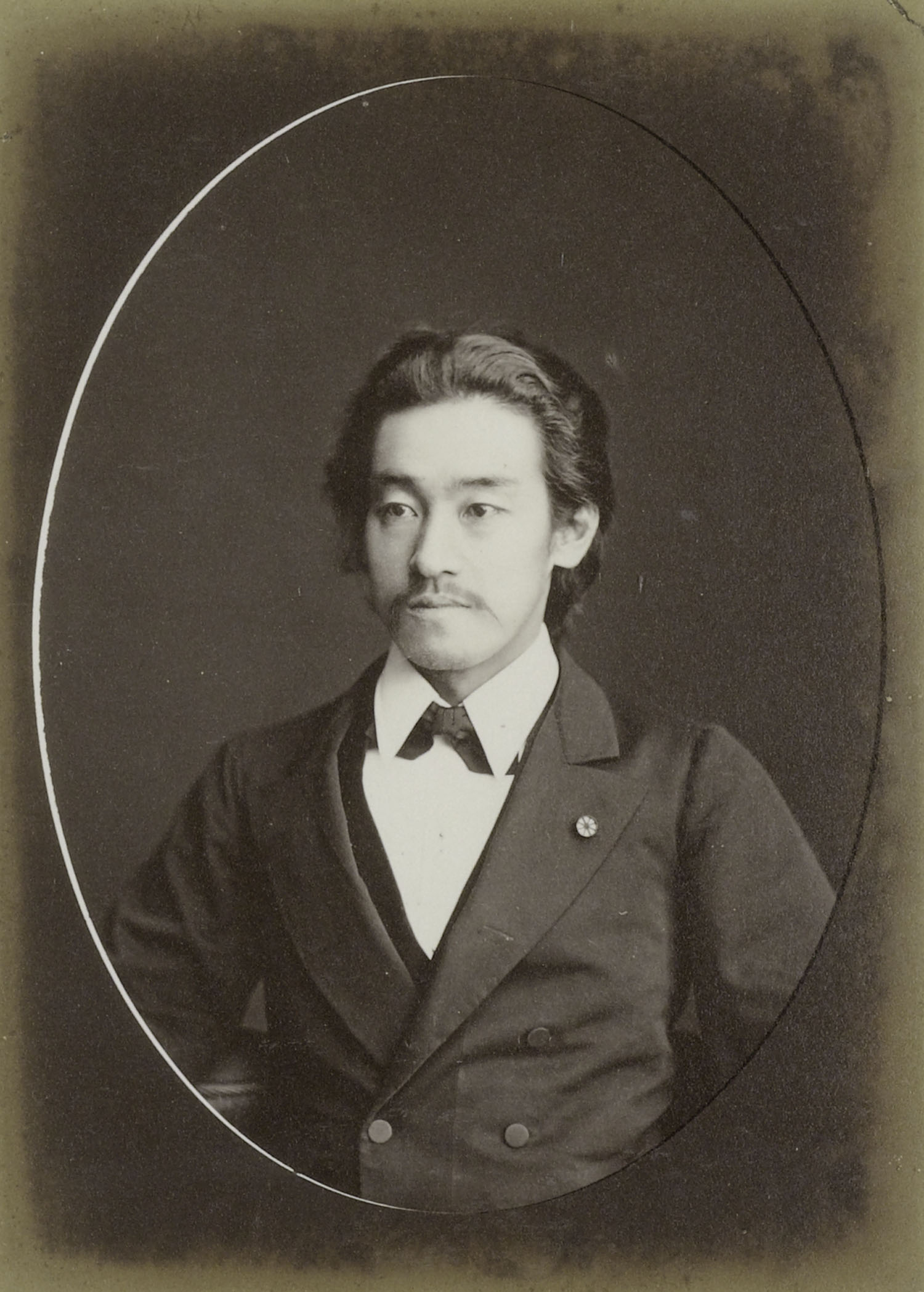
Kuki as a young man (before 1900)

Kuki was born Hoshizaki Sadajirō in Sanda Domain (present-day Sanda, Hyōgo Prefecture), the second son of Hoshizaki Sadamoto, a retainer of the Sanda Domain. After his mother died in 1860, he was adopted by Kuki Takahiro, the karō of Ayabe Domain, through the mediation of Kuki Takayoshi, the daimyo of Sanda. In 1866, he succeeded as the head of the Kuki family.

In the early years of the Meiji period, after studying under Fukuzawa Yukichi, he took a post in the Japanese Ministry of Education, specializing in cultural policy. In 1884, he was appointed Japanese ambassador to the United States.

Complications in his career arose when his wife Hatsu had an affair with Okakura Kakuzō. He eventually returned to Japan where he continued to work in the Ministry of Education, and play a role as a patron of the arts. In 1897, he was appointed as the first Director of the Imperial Museum (presently Tokyo National Museum) and he worked on establishing the Law for the Preservation of Ancient Shrines and Temples (古社寺保存法, koshaji hozonhō of June 5, 1897), the first law which defines cultural properties in Japan.

== Honours ==
From the Japanese Wikipedia article

=== Japanese titles and decorations ===
- Grand Cordon of the Order of the Sacred Treasure (4 September 1895)
- Baron (5 June 1896)
- Grand Cordon of the Order of the Rising Sun (27 December 1902; Second Class: 29 May 1888; Third Class: 1 November 1882; Fourth Class: 27 December 1879)
- Grand Cordon of the Order of the Paulownia Flowers (18 August 1931; posthumous)

=== Japanese medals ===
- Imperial Constitution Promulgation Commemorative Medal (25 November 1889)
- Annexation of Korea Commemorative Medal (1 August 1912)
- Coronation commemorative medal (10 November 1915 and 10 November 1928)

=== Japanese court ranks ===
- Senior sixth rank (17 June 1874)
- Fifth rank (24 February 1875)
- Senior fifth rank (24 May 1880)
- Fourth rank (20 December 1880)
- Third rank (20 December 1886)
- Senior third rank (16 December 1890)
- Second rank (20 March 1900)
- Senior second rank (11 February 1924)

=== Other honours ===
- Knight of the Legion of Honour and Officer of the Order of Public Instruction of France (9 July 1879)
- Officer of the Order of the Crown of Italy (19 August 1879)
- Medal (1st Class) of the Royal Order of the Crown of Hawaii (8 March 1890)
