= Takakura Teru =

Japanese novelist, playwright, politician, and central committee member

- 高倉 輝
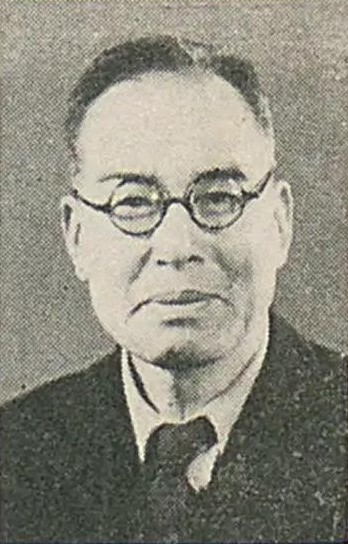
- Takakura in 1947

Member of the House of Representatives
- In office 10 April 1946 – 31 March 1947
- Preceded by: Constituency established
- Succeeded by: Multi-member district
- Constituency: Nagano at-large

Personal details
- Born: 14 April 1891 Kubokawa, Kōchi, Japan
- Died: 2 April 1986 (aged 94) Akishima, Tokyo, Japan
- Party: Communist
- Education: Kyoto Imperial University
- Writing career
- Language: Japanese
- Period: Taishō literature; Shōwa literature
- Movement: Proletarian literature

Takakura Teru (Japanese: 高倉 輝, Hepburn: Takakura Teru; born Takakura Terutaka, Japanese: 高倉 輝豊; 14 April 1891 – 2 April 1986) was a Japanese novelist, playwright, politician and central committee member of the Japanese Communist Party from 1950 to 1951.

Takakura graduated from Kyoto Imperial University and was a left-wing thinker of the Kyoto School. He was arrested several times under the Public Security Preservation Laws prior to the Allied occupation of Japan. In 1945 he fled parole to attend a funeral and was arrested along with Miki Kiyoshi, who he had gone to for clothes and money. This would inevitably lead to Miki's death in prison. Takakura however, following his release at the hands of the Allied Occupation, went on to become a politician for the Japanese Communist Party in 1946.
