= Ma Yifu =

Chinese philosopher of New Confucianism

Ma Yifu (1883-1967), born Fu, courtesy name Yifo, was a Chinese philosopher, poet, and calligrapher. He was one of the leading scholars of the modern New-Confucianism, along with Liang Shuming and Xiong Shili, collectively known as the "Three Sages of New Confucianism." Skilled in poetry and literature, proficient in calligraphy, and also deeply versed in philosophy and Buddhism, he is known as the 'Supreme Master of Confucianism, Buddhism, and philosophy'.

== Life and career ==
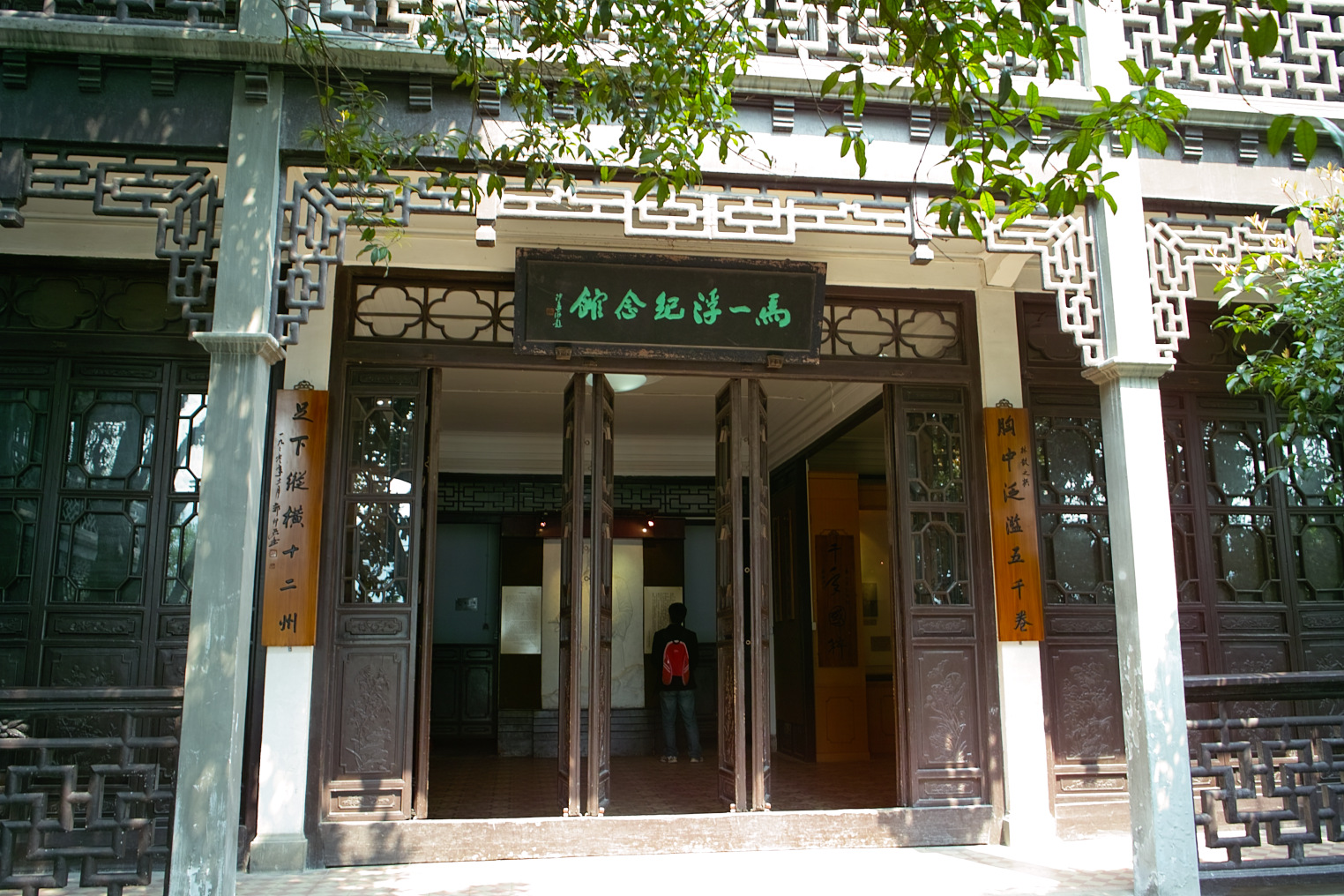
The Ma Yifu Memorial Hall, West Lake, Hangzhou.

He was born on April 2, 1883, in Chengdu, Sichuan Province. He was the fourth child in the family. His father, Ma Tingpei, had served as the magistrate of Renshou County in Sichuan. At the age of five, he returned to his ancestral home in Shaoxing.

Ma Yifu attended private school at the age of four to study the classic texts. In 1898, at the age of 15, he ranked first in the provincial-level imperial examination. Among the candidates were distinguished writer Lu Xun (Zhou Shuren) and his brother Zhou Zuoren. To the account of Feng Zikai, Ma Yifu effortlessly quoted and recited classical texts with precision. Hongyi praised Ma as being "naturally endowed with knowledge and wisdom."

In 1901, he co-founded "Translation World" with Xie Wuliang, Ma Junwu, and others. In 1903, he went to the United States to study European literature and later traveled to Germany and Japan to study Western philosophy. In 1911, he returned to China and supported the 1911 Revolution led by Sun Yat-sen. Later, he devoted himself to the study of traditional Chinese culture. During the Second Sino-Japanese War, he served as a professor at National Zhejiang University.

In 1939, he established the Fuxing Institute (复性学院) in Sichuan as an independent educational institution dedicated to teaching and promoting traditional Chinese culture, with a particular focus on the Six Arts. In 1953, he became the director of Zhejiang Museum of Literature and History.

During the Cultural Revolution, despite his lifelong integrity, he bowed to the Red Guards in his old age; when his home was raided, he pleaded, "Can I keep a inkstone to write?" but received a slap instead. Overwhelmed with grief and indignation, he died soon after.

== Philosophy ==
Ma Yifu advocated that the Six Arts initially taught by Confucius are the foundation of academic studies in Chinese cultural studies, and that Six Arts "could be a guide to all learning." He believed that contrary to being outdated, the Six Arts retained their relevance and would continue to cultivate well-rounded individuals with sound judgment and virtue, enabling them to address real-life challenges at all times.
