= Shūzō Kuki =

Japanese philosopher

- Born: February 15, 1888; Tokyo Prefecture, Japan
- Died: May 6, 1941 (aged 53); Kyoto, Japan

Philosophical work
- Era: 20th-century philosophy
- Region: Japanese philosophy
- School: Kyoto School
- Institutions: Kyoto University
- Main interests: Aesthetics; philosophy of culture; contingency; existentialism

Shūzō Kuki (九鬼 周造, Kuki Shūzō; February 15, 1888 – May 6, 1941) was a Japanese art critic, philosopher, and poet.

== Early life ==
Kuki was the fourth child of Baron Kuki Ryūichi (九鬼 隆一) a high bureaucrat in the Meiji Ministry for Culture and Education (Monbushō). Since it appears that Kuki's mother, Hatsu, was already pregnant when she fell in love with Okakura Kakuzō (岡倉 覚三), otherwise known as Okakura Tenshin (岡倉 天心), a protégé of her husband's (a notable patron of the arts), the rumour that Okakura was Kuki's father would appear to be groundless. It is true, however, that Shūzō as a child, after his mother had separated and then divorced his father, thought of Okakura, who often visited, as his real father, and later certainly hailed him as his spiritual father. From Okakura, he gained much of his fascination for aesthetics and perhaps foreign languages, as indeed his fascination with the peculiar cultural codes of the pleasure quarters of Japan owes something to the fact that his mother had once been a geisha.

At age 23 in 1911 (Meiji 44), Kuki converted to Catholicism; and he was baptized in Tokyo as Franciscus Assisiensis Kuki Shūzō. The idealism and introspection implied by this decision were early evidence of issues which would have resonance in the characteristic mindset of the mature man.

A graduate in philosophy of Tokyo Imperial University, Kuki spent eight years in Europe to polish his knowledge of languages and deepen his already significant studies of contemporary Western thought. At the University of Heidelberg, he studied under the neo-Kantian Heinrich Rickert, and he engaged Eugen Herrigel as a tutor. At the University of Paris, he was impressed by the work of Henri Bergson, whom he came to know personally; and he engaged the young Jean-Paul Sartre as a French tutor. It is little known outside Japan that it has been claimed that Kuki influenced Jean-Paul Sartre to develop an interest in Husserl and his student Heidegger's philosophical approach. Sartre's actual engagement with Husserl's phenomenology however began several years later, dating to a remark by Raymond Aron in a coffee shop discussion in 1932.

At the University of Freiburg, Kuki studied phenomenology under Edmund Husserl; and he first met Martin Heidegger in Husserl's home. He moved to the University of Marburg for Heidegger's 1927/1928 winter semester lectures on the phenomenological interpretation of Kant's Critique of Pure Reason (published as volume 25 in the Heidegger Gesamtausgabe), and for Heidegger's seminar "Schelling's Essay on the Essence of Human Freedom." The following semester (Summer, 1928) he attended Heidegger's lecture on logic in the light of Leibniz (HGA 26) and his seminar on Aristotle's Physics. Fellow students during these years in Europe were Tetsurō Watsuji and Kiyoshi Miki.

== Career ==
Shortly after Kuki's return to Japan, he wrote and published his masterpiece, The Structure of "Iki" (1930). In this work he undertakes to make a phenomenological analysis of iki, a variety of chic culture current among the fashionable set in Edo in the Tokugawa period, and asserted that it constituted one of the essential values of Japanese culture.

Kuki took up a teaching post at Kyoto University, then a prominent center for conservative cultural values and thinking. His early lectures focused on Descartes and Bergson. In the context of a faculty with a primarily Germanic philosophical background, his lectures offered a somewhat different perspective based on the work of French philosophers.

He became an associate professor in 1933. In that same year, he published the first book length study of Martin Heidegger to appear in Japanese. In this context, it is noteworthy that the German philosopher explicitly referenced a conversation "between a Japanese and an inquirer" in On the Way to Language (Aus einem Gespräch von der Sprache). Also, Heidegger expressed a desire to have written the preface to the German translation of The Structure of "Iki".

At the University of Kyoto, Kuki was elevated to professor of philosophy in March 1934. The following year he published The Problem of Contingency, also known as The Problem of the Accidental. This work was developed from his personal experiences in Europe and the influences of Heidegger. As a single Japanese man within an encompassing "white" or non-Japanese society, he considered the extent to which he became a being who lacked necessity. His Kyoto University lectures on Heidegger, Man and Existence, were published in 1939.

From the mid-1930s, while Japan drifted towards totalitarianism and the war in China dragged on, Kuki seemed not to be much disturbed by the growth of militarism.

In 1941, at the age of 53, Kuki died following an attack of peritonitis. His manuscripts are now kept in the Konan University Library.

== Works ==
=== Published works ===
Published while alive

- On Time [Propos sur le temps] (Paris: Philippe Renouard, 1928).
- The Structure of “Iki” [「いき」の構造] (Tokyo: Iwanami Shoten, 1930).
- The Problem of Contingency [偶然性の問題] (Tokyo: Iwanami Shoten, 1935).
- Humanity and Existence [人間と実存] (Tokyo: Iwanami Shoten, 1939).
  A collection of Kuki’s essays on philosophy.

Published posthumously

- Literary Theory [文芸論] (Tokyo: Iwanami Shoten, 1941).
  A collection of Kuki’s essays on literature.
- Occasional Writings [遠里丹婦麗天] (Tokyo: Iwanami Shoten, 1941).
- Paris of My Mind [巴里心景] (Tokyo: Kôchô Shôrin, 1942).
  A collection of Kuki’s poetry.
- A Draft History of Modern Western Philosophy [西洋近世哲学史稿] (Tokyo: Iwanami Shoten, 1944).
- Lectures on Contemporary French Philosophy [現代フランス哲学講義] (Tokyo: Iwanami Shoten, 1957).

=== Collected works ===
Kuki’s Collected Works [九鬼周造全集], in 12 volumes (often abbreviated KSZ in scholarly publications, for Kuki Shûzô Zenshû), are published by Iwanami Shoten.

Vol. 1

- The Structure of “Iki” [「いき」の構造], KSZ1:1-85.
  - ‘Introduction’ [序説]
  - ‘The Intentional Structure of “Iki”’ [「いき」の内包的構造]
  - ‘The Extensional Structure of “Iki”’ [「いき」の外延的構造]
  - ‘The Natural Expression of “Iki”’ [「いき」の自然的表現]
  - ‘The Artistic Expression of “Iki”’ [「いき」の芸術的表現]
  - ‘Conclusion’ [結論]
- ‘The Essence of “Iki”’ [「いき」の本質], KSZ1:87-108.
  A draft of The Structure of “Iki”.
- Paris of My Mind [巴里心景], KSZ1:109-218.
- ‘The Present State of French and German Philosophy’ [仏独哲学界の現状], KSZ1:221-32.
- ‘Japanese Culture’ [日本文化], KSZ1:233-37.
- ‘Faith and Knowledge’ [Glauben und Wissen], KSZ1:298-344 (German original), KSZ1:351-98 (Japanese translation by Satô Akio).
  Kuki's thesis written during his time at Tokyo Imperial University, on the subject of faith and knowledge in European medieval philosophy.
- On Time [Propos sur le temps], KSZ1:263-94 (French original), KSZ1:399-433 (Japanese translation by Sakamoto Kenzô).
  Contains two lectures that Kuki delivered at Pontigny in August 1928, ‘La notion du temps et la reprise sur le temps en orient’ and ‘L’expression de l’infini dans l’art japonais’.
- ‘Things Japanese’ [Choses japonaises], KSZ1:239-62 (French original), KSZ1:435-58 (Japanese translation by Sakamoto Kenzô).
  A series of short essays, which the editors surmise were written during Kuki’s stay in Paris, including ‘Bergson au Japon’ and ‘À la manière d’Hérodote’.

Vol. 2

- The Problem of Contingency [偶然性の問題], KSZ2:1-264.
  - ‘Introduction’ [序説]
  - ‘Categorical Contingency’ [定言的偶然]
  - ‘Hypothetical Contingency’ [仮定的偶然]
  - ‘Disjunctive Contingency’ [離接的偶然]
  - ‘Conclusion’ [結論]
- ‘Contingency’ [偶然性], KSZ2:267-322.
  Kuki’s doctoral dissertation.
- ‘Contingency’ [偶然性], KSZ2:323-51.
  A lecture by Kuki.
- ‘The Logic of Becoming Contingent’ [偶然化の論理], KSZ2:353-73.
- ‘An Enquiry into the Basic Character of Contingency’ [偶然性の基礎的性格の一考察], KSZ2:375-84.

Vol. 3

- Humanity and Existence [人間と実存], KSZ3:1-292.
  - ‘What Is Anthropology?’ [人間学とは何か]
  - ‘Existentialist Philosophy’ [実存哲学]
  - ‘View of Life’ [人生観]
  - ‘My View of Philosophy’ [哲学私見]
  - ‘Aspects of Contingency’ [偶然の諸相]
  - ‘The Feeling of Surprise and Contingency’ [驚きの情と偶然性]
  - ‘Metaphysical Time’ [形而上学的時間]
  - ‘Heidegger’s Philosophy’ [ハイデッガーの哲学]
  - ‘The Japanese Character’ [日本的性格]
- ‘The Problem of Time: Bergson and Heidegger’ [時間の問題——ベルクソンとハイデッガー], KSZ3:295-337.
- ‘The Temporality of Literature’ [文学の時間性], KSZ3:339-65.
- ‘On the Japanese Character’ [日本的性格について], KSZ3:367-99.
- ‘Characteristics of French Philosophy’ [フランス哲学の特徴], KSZ3:401-14
- ‘General Characteristics of French Philosophy’ [Caractères généraux de la philosophie française], KSZ3:415-23.
  French version of the one above.
- Contributions to the Dictionary of Philosophy [哲学辞典], KSZ3:425-36.
  Entries on ‘Duration’ [持続], ‘Vitalism’ [生の哲学], ‘Life’ [生命] and ‘Creative evolution’ [創造的進化].

Vol. 4

- Literary Theory [文芸論], KSZ4:1-513.
  - ‘Metaphysics of Literature’ [文学の形而上学], KSZ4:7-59.
  - ‘An Enquiry into Elegance’ [風流に関する一考察], KSZ4:60-82.
  - ‘Fusion of Art and Life’ [芸術と生活の融合], KSZ4:83-169.
  - ‘Genealogy of Emotion’ [情緒の系図], KSZ4:170-222.
  - ‘Rhyme in Japanese Poetry’ [日本詩の押韻], KSZ4:223-513.

Vol. 5: Occasional Writings [をりにふれて] and Theory of Rhyme [押韻論]

Vol. 6: A Draft History of Modern Western Philosophy, Vol. 1 [西洋近世哲学史稿 (上)]

Vol. 7: A Draft History of Modern Western Philosophy, Vol. 2 [西洋近世哲学史稿 (下)]

Vol. 8: Lectures on Contemporary French Philosophy [現代フランス哲学講義]

Vol. 9: Lectures on Contemporary Philosophy [講義 現代哲学] and Seminars on Trends in Contemporary Philosophy [講演 現代哲学の動向]

Vol. 10: Lectures on Heidegger’s Phenomenological Ontology [講義 ハイデッガーの現象学的存在論]

Vol. 11: Introductory Lectures on Literature [講義 文学概論] and Lectures on Contingency [講義 偶然性

- The lectures entitled Outline of Literature were delivered by Kuki at the University of Tokyo in 1933. Among them is the lecture Guzen (Contingency) which is translated in Marra, 2011.

Vol. 12: Miscellaneous Documents [資料篇]

== References and further reading ==
=== Secondary sources ===
- Botz-Bornstein, Thorsten. "Contingency and the Time of the Dream: Kuki Shuzo and French Prewar Philosophy," in Philosophy East and West 50:4 (2000).
- ———. "Iki, Style, Trace: Shuzo Kuki and the Spirit of Hermeneutics," in Philosophy East and West 47: 4 (1997): 554–580.
- Light, Stephen. Kuki Shūzō and Jean-Paul Sartre: Influence and Counter-Influence in the Early History of Existential Phenomenology. Carbondale: Southern Illinois University Press, 1987.
- Marra, Michael F. Kuki Shuzo: A Philosopher's Poetry and Poetics. Honolulu: University of Hawai'i Press, 2004.
- ——— Japanese Hermeneutics: Current Debates on Aesthetics and Interpretation. Honolulu: University of Hawai'i Press, 2002.
- ——— Japan's Frames of Reference: A Hermeneutics Reader. Honolulu: University of Hawai'i Press, 2011.
- Mayeda, Graham. "Is there a Method to Chance? Contrasting Kuki Shūzō’s Phenomenological Methodology in the Problem of Contingency with that of His Contemporaries Wilhelm Windelband and Heinrich Rickert." In Frontiers of Japanese Philosophy II: Neglected Themes and Hidden Variations. Edited by Victor S. Hori and Melissa Anne-Marie Curley. Nagoya: Nanzan Institute for Religion and Culture, 2008.
- ———. Japanese Philosophers on Society and Culture: Nishida Kitarō, Watsuji Tetsurō, and Kuki Shūzō. Lanham: Lexington Books, 2020.
- ———. "Time for Ethics: Temporality and the Ethical Ideal in Emmanuel Levinas and Kuki Shūzō," in Comparative and Continental Philosophy 4: 1 (2012): 105–124.
- ———. Time, Space and Ethics in the Philosophy of Watsuji Tetsurō, Kuki Shūzō, and Martin Heidegger. New York: Routledge, 2006.
- Nara, Hiroshi. The Structure of Detachment: the Aesthetic Vision of Kuki Shūzō with a Translation of "Iki no kōzō." Honolulu: University of Hawaii Press, 2004.
- Parkes, Graham. Heidegger and Asian Thought. Honolulu: University of Hawaii Press, 1990.
- Pincus, Leslie. Authenticating Culture in Imperial Japan: Kuki Shūzō and the Rise of National Aesthetics. Berkeley: University of California Press, 1996.
- Saitō, Takako. ""The Human and the Absolute in the Writings of Kuki Shūzō" (Archive). In Volume 3 of Frontiers of Japanese Philosophy, 58–72. Edited by James W. Heisig and Mayuko Uehara (written as Uehara Mayuko). Nagoya: Nanzan Institute for Religion and Culture, 2008.
- ———."In Search of the Absolute: Kuki Shūzō and Shinran" (Archive). In Volume 7 of Frontiers of Japanese Philosophy, 232–246. Edited by James W. Heisig and Rein Raud. Nagoya: Nanzan Institute for Religion and Culture, 2010.
- Sakabe, Megumi. Washida Seiichi and Fujita Masakatsu, eds. Kuki Shūzō no sekai. Tokyo: Minerva Shobō, 2002.
- St. Clair, Robert N. "The Phenomenology of Self Across Cultures." In Intercultural Communication Studies 13: 3 (2004): 8–26.
- Takada, Yasunari. "Shuzo Kuki: or, A Sense of Being In-between" (Archive) In: Takada, Yasunari. Transcendental Descent: Essays in Literature and Philosophy (Collection UTCP-2). The University of Tokyo Center for Philosophy (UTCP). p. 281–295.
- Yasuda, Takeshi and Michitarō Tada. "Iki" no kōzō’ o yomu. Tokyo: Asahi Sensho, 1979.
