= Lin Mosei =

Taiwanese academic and educator

- 林茂生
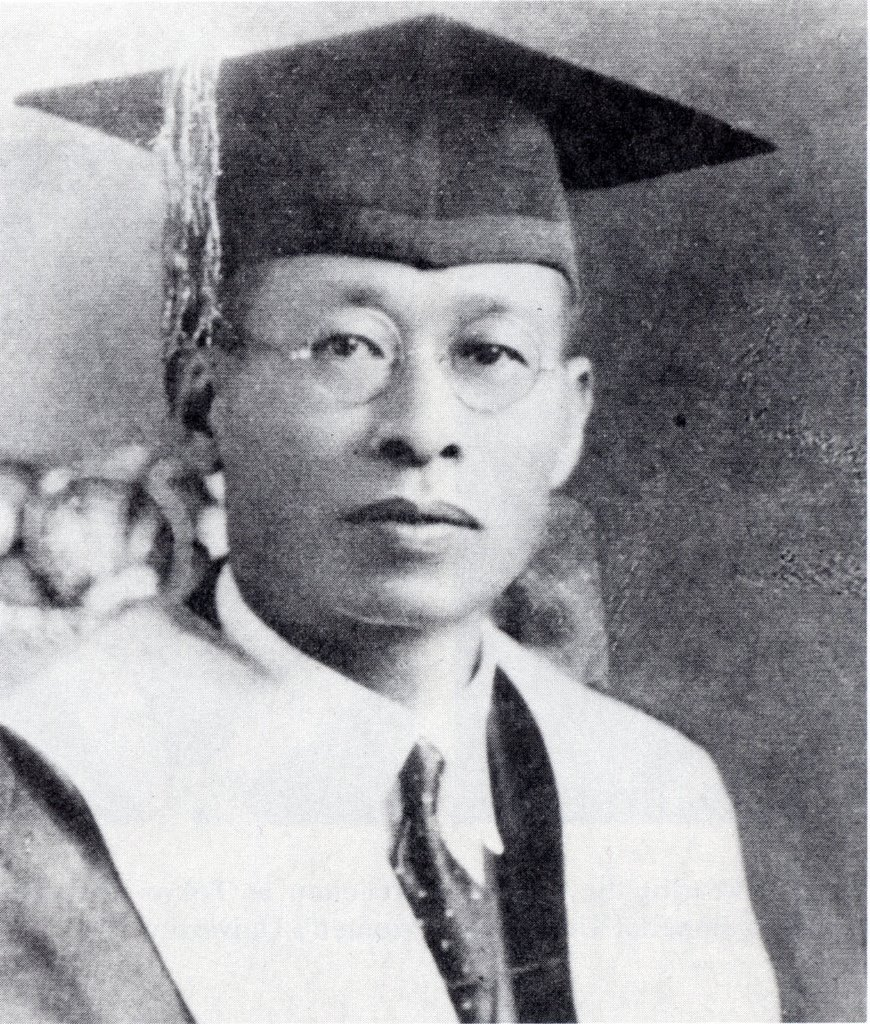
- Born: 30 October 1887; Donggang, Pingtung, Tainan Prefecture (Qing dynasty)
- Died: 11 March 1947 (aged 59) (Reportedly); Taipei
- Education: Tokyo Imperial University (BA); Columbia University (MA, PhD)
- Occupation: Scholar

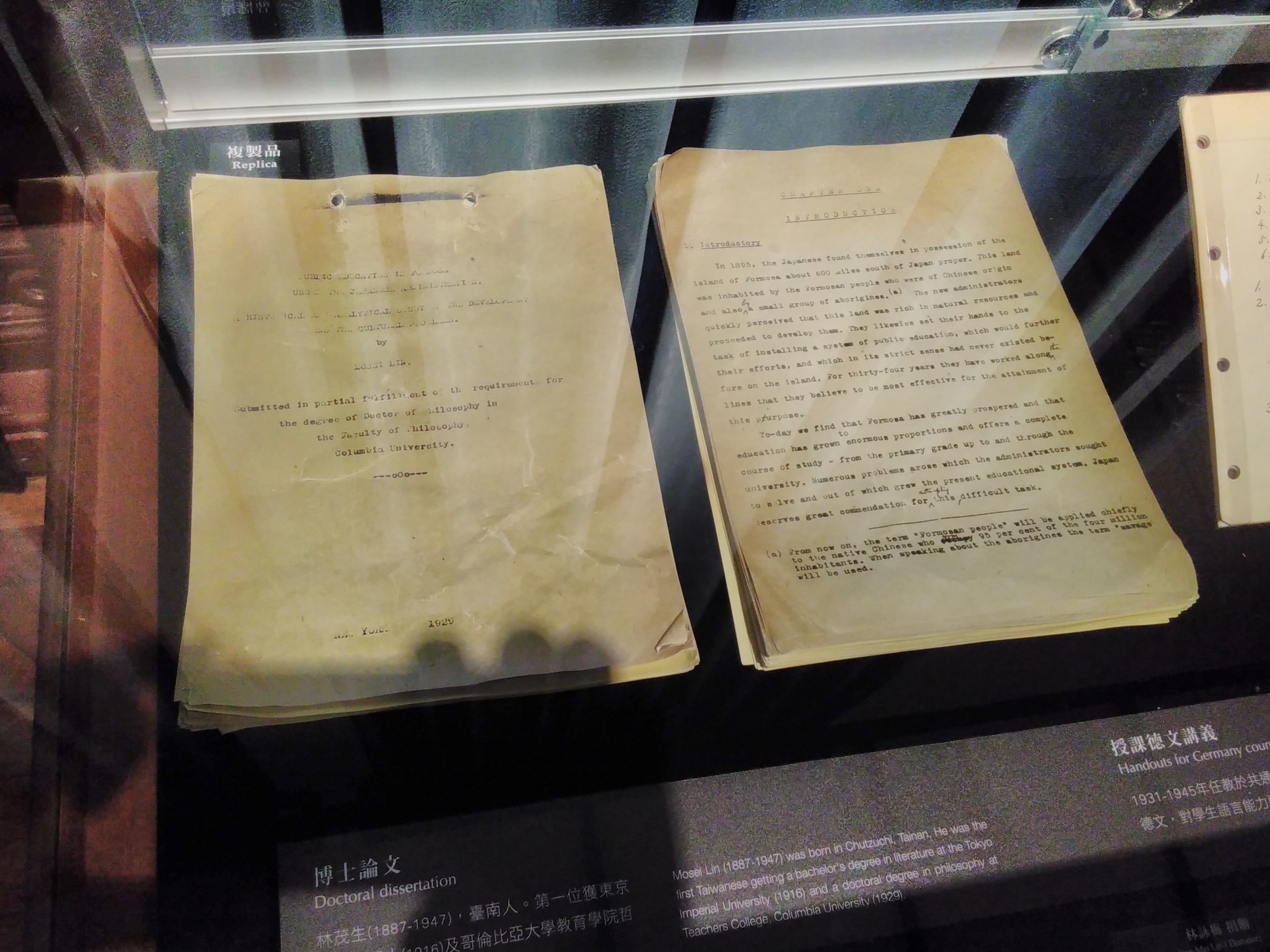
A replica of Lin Mosei's Columbia University PhD (doctoral) thesis displayed in the NCKU Museum.

Lin Mosei (Chinese: 林茂生; pinyin: Lín Màoshēng; Pe̍h-ōe-jī: Lîm Bō͘-seng; Katakana: リン モセイ; born 30 October 1887, disappeared 11 March 1947) was a Taiwanese academic and educator. He was the first Taiwanese person to receive a Doctor of Philosophy (Ph.D.) degree in the United States. He was also a calligrapher and a Christian.

Lin disappeared within days of the February 28 Incident in Taiwan in 1947; he is generally believed to have been killed as a part of Chinese Nationalist Party's crackdown after the island-wide civilian uprising.

Lin's second son, Lin Tsung-yi, was an academic and educator in psychiatry.

== Life and career ==
Mosei was born on October 30, 1887, in Tainan Prefecture (now Tainan), Qing Taiwan, to a Presbyterian minister. In 1916, he earned a B.A. in philosophy from Tokyo Imperial University, becoming the first Taiwanese graduate of the institution. In 1928, he received an M.A. in literature from Columbia University in New York, where he studied under prominent scholars John Dewey and Paul Monroe. The following year, in 1929, he obtained his Ph.D. in education from Columbia. His doctoral dissertation, Public Education in Formosa Under the Japanese Administration: A Historical and Analytical Study of the Development and the Cultural Problems, was written in English and was not translated into Chinese until 2000. In 1945, he became the dean of arts at the National Taiwan University in Taipei. He disappeared on March 11, 1947, shortly after the February 28 incident.
