= Tomonaga Sanjūrō =

Japanese academic and esteemed professor

- 朝永 三十郎
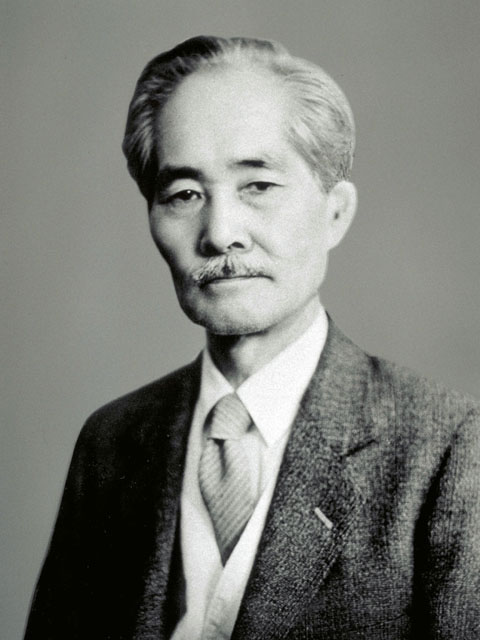
- Born: March 25, 1871; Kawatana, Japan
- Died: September 18, 1951 (aged 80)
- Other name: Sanjūrō Tomonaga
- Occupation: University professor
- Children: Shinichirō Tomonaga

Academic work
- Discipline: Philosophy
- Sub-discipline: History of philosophy
- School or tradition: Kyoto School
- Institutions: Kyoto Imperial University; Ōtani University
- Notable students: Obara Kuniyoshi
- Main interests: Western philosophy; Kantian philosophy

Tomonaga Sanjūrō (朝永 三十郎, Tomonaga Sanjūrō; 1871–1951) was a Japanese academic and esteemed professor emeritus of medieval, renaissance, early modern, and Kantian philosophy at the University of Kyoto during the early 20th century. He was one of the leading thinkers of the Kyoto School.

His son, Shinichirō Tomonaga, is also renowned for receiving the 1965 Nobel Prize in Physics for the development of quantum electrodynamics.

== Life ==
Tomonaga was born in Nagasaki Prefecture the second son of Tomonaga Jinjirō, a samurai of the Ōmura Domain, in 1871. After graduating from Nagasaki Ōmura Junior High School (now known as Nagasaki Prefectural Omura High School) and then First Higher School, he entered the Tokyo Imperial University. After graduating, he became the assistant professor of philosophy at Kyoto Imperial University in 1907 and then full professor in 1913. He mainly lectured on Western philosophy and history of philosophy, and along with Nishida Kitarō and Tanabe Hajime, constituted the important intellectual Kyoto School movement of modern Japan.

Tomonaga was well known to be an unprolific writer but left a prestigious body of work and was mentor to many renowned Japanese philosophers, including Amano Teiyū, Obara Kuniyoshi, Yamauchi Tokuryū and Kosaka Masaaki. He retired from Kyoto Imperial University in 1931 and then became full professor at Ōtani University.

== Works ==
- (1902) An Introduction to Philosophy (哲学綱要).
- (1905) A Dictionary of Philosophy (哲学辞典).
- (1907) Philosophy and Life (哲学と人生).
- (1909) Philosophy of Person and Philosophy of Beyond Person (人格の哲学と超人格の哲学).
- (1916) The History of Self-Consciousness in Relation to the Self of Modernity: New Idealism and Its Context (近世に於ける「我」の自覚史 新理想主義と其背景).
- (1922) Kant's Theory of Peace (カントの平和論).
- (1925) Decartes (デカート).
- (1936) Meditations of Descartes(デカルト省察録)
- (1948) A Short Work for the History of Philosophy: Rousseau, Kant, and Lotze (哲学史的小品 ルソー・カント・ロッツェ).
- (1949) "Philosophy From Renaissance to Kant" in Vol. 1 of the History of Western Philosophy (西洋近世哲学史 第1冊 ルネッサンス及び先カントの哲学).

Collected essays

- Tomonaga Sanjūrō, The Collected Essays of Prof. Tomonoga in Honor of His 60th Birthday, eds. Amano Tenyū (Tokyo, Iwanami Shoten, 1931).
