= Shoki Coe =

Shoki Coe (Chinese: 黃彰輝; pinyin: Huang Zhanghui; Wade–Giles: Hwang Chang-Hui; Pe̍h-ōe-jī: N̂g Chiong-hui; 20 August 1914 – 28 October 1988) was a minister of the Presbyterian Church in Taiwan, erstwhile principal of Tainan Theological Seminary (1949–1965) and director of the Theological Education Fund of the World Council of Churches. Through the Theological Education Fund, he is widely known for his coinage of the notion of "contextualizing theology," later better known as "contextual theology," which argues for theology's need to respond to the sociopolitical concerns of a local context. He was named by Kosuke Koyama as the latter's spiritual father.

== Name ==
His name reveals several layers of complexity in his own sense of identity. He was given the name Chang Hui Hwang (or C. H. Hwang) at birth, a name he published under in 1968. However, the name he chose to publish under in the 1970s and 1980s was Shoki Coe, the Anglicized version of his name in Japanese, reflecting the context of the Taiwan of his birth under Japanese rule.

== Education ==
Coe studied at Taiwan High School, the former version of National Taiwan Normal University between 1931 and 1934. It was the only school that could connect to tertiary education during the Japanese colonial period. He pursued a B.A. in philosophy at the University of Tokyo and finished in 1937. In 1938, he obtained a scholarship to study theology at Westminster College, Cambridge, and stayed at the home of a Taiwanese missionary, David Landsborough.

== Family ==
He married Winifred Saunders, a Bristol native, in 1944 in the United Kingdom. Together they had four children – David, Michael, Eileen and Andrew.

== Writings ==
- "In Search of Renewal in Theological Education" in Theological Education. Summer 1973.
- "Theological Education—A Worldwide Perspective" in Theological Education. Autumn 1974.
- Recollections and reflections. New York: The Rev. Dr. Shoki Coe's Memorial Fund, 1993.
- Christian mission in the context of Asian nation building. New Jersey: Princeton Theological Seminary Educational Media, 2011.
- Human rights in Taiwan today. New Jersey: Princeton Theological Seminary Educational Media, 2011.
- Missio Dei. New Jersey: Princeton Theological Seminary Educational Media, 2011.
- Text and context in missions. New Jersey: Princeton Theological Seminary Educational Media, 2011.
- Christian mission and the test of discipleship : the Princeton lectures, 1970 (edited and introduced by Michael Nai-Chiu Poon). Singapore: Trinity Theological College, 2012.
