= Paul Monroe =

American educator

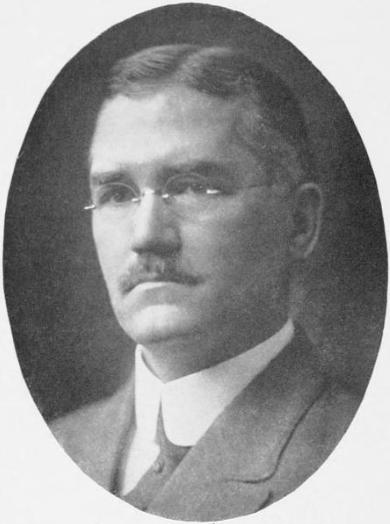

Paul Monroe, Ph.D., LL.D. (1869–1947) was an American educator. He specialized in the history of education, and in comparative studies.

== Biography ==
He was born at North Madison, Indiana. He graduated at Franklin College, Franklin, Indiana in 1890, studied at the University of Heidelberg and took his Ph.D. from the University of Chicago in 1897. He became professor at Columbia in 1899, his research involving education in its historic aspect. As well as Columbia, he lectured at Yale University and the University of California. During 1912–1913, he reported on the condition of education in the Philippines. Professor Monroe received the honorary degree of LL.D. from the University of Peking in 1913.

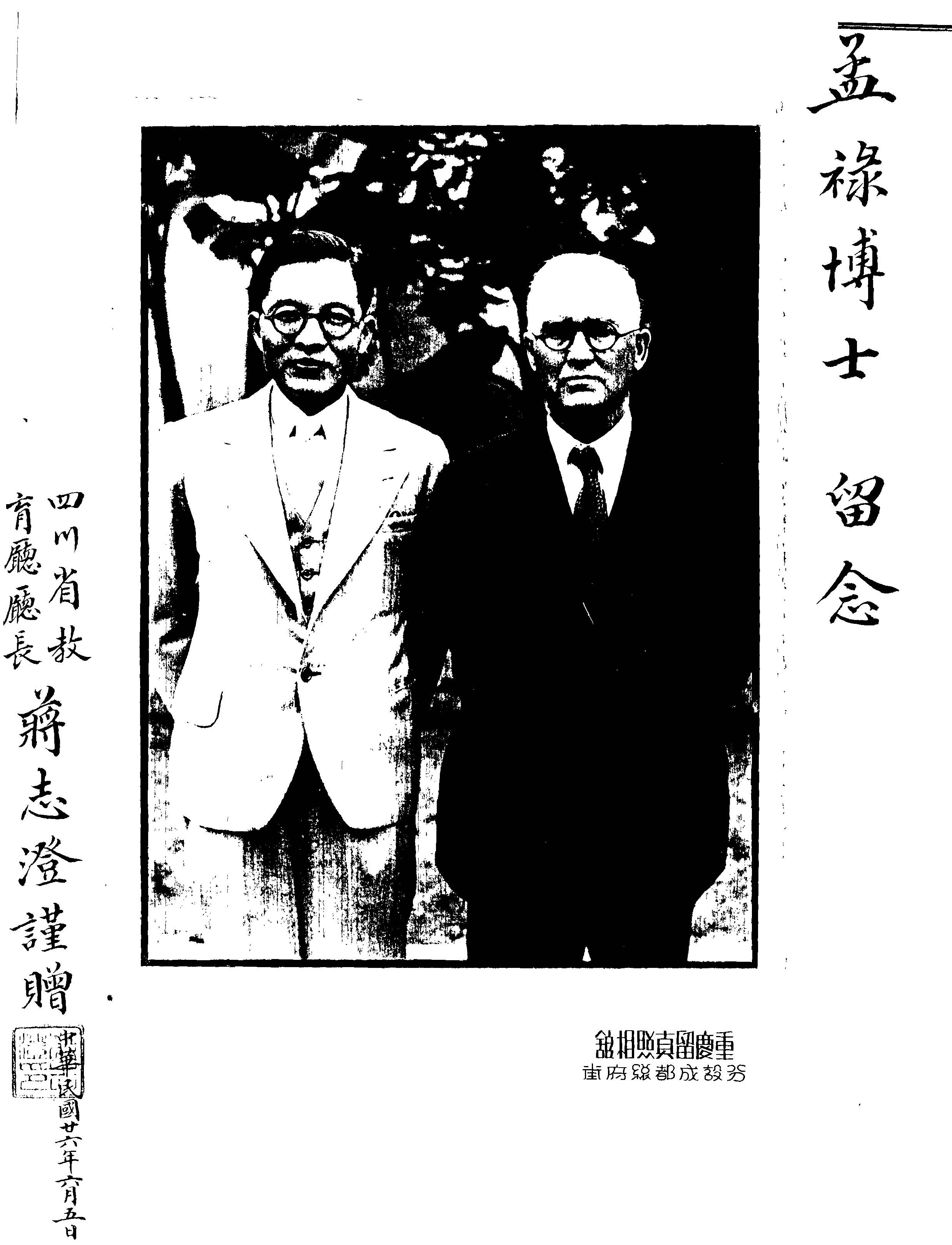
Jiang Zhicheng and Paul Monroe

Paul Monroe had a significant impact on the development of education in China and made a dozen trips there in the 1920s and 1930s. He contributed much to educational interaction between China and the United States, and his impact on Chinese students at Columbia who later became leading educators in China, such as Guo Bingwen, Tao Xingzhi, Chen Heqin, Jiang Menglin, Wang Tso-Yan (Zhuoran) and Zhang Boling, was considerable. These students, who enrolled at Teachers College at Columbia, were influenced by the theoretical educational innovations of John Dewey, but Paul Monroe exerted a practical influence on their ideas about curricular implementation. He advanced practical methods for democratizing Chinese education, which extended to the development of the "6-3-3" educational program. Creativity and the development of self-confidence were major educational goals for Monroe. As he said: "The essence of democracy is that all people, no matter whether intelligent or backward, should have the equal chance of full development."

Paul Monroe was invited and went to China to research and promote education in September, 1921. During the three months he visited more than 200 schools and institutions in 9 provinces, and made more than 60 speeches. In December China Education Improvement Society was founded, he was elected as an honorary member of the council along with several other figures including John Dewey, and his student T'ao Hsing-chih was elected as secretary-general, and through the society the educationists promoted the forming of modern educational system in China. Later he helped to establish Sino-American joint engineering college in Shanghai jointly founded by National Southeastern University (later renamed National Central University and then Nanking University), Harvard University and Massachusetts Institute of Technology, which soon ceased due to the wars outbroken in the area.

In 1932, Monroe led an expedition of educators from the International Education Institute to Iraq, where they visited schools in the Baghdad and Basra areas before hosting a conference on education in the nation's capital and publishing their findings in the Monroe Report to the Government of Iraq. Monroe was accompanied by his doctoral student Muhammad Fadil al-Jamali, who contributed a chapter from his dissertation, New Iraq, to the Monroe Report, and also acted as interpreter for the expedition.

His contributions to the study of education also gave Dr. Monroe an international reputation, and his textbooks have helped to give the subject a position of great importance in the United States. He was the President of Robert College of Istanbul between 1932 and 1935. His greatest contribution was as editor-in-chief of the massive and wide-ranging Encyclopedia of Education, in five volumes (1910–1913).

== Works ==
He authored:

- Source Book in the History of Education for the Greek and Roman Period (1901)
- A Text-Book in the History of Education (1905)
- Brief Course in the History of Education (1907)
- Paul Monroe (ed.), A Cyclopedia of Education, New York: Macmillan – via HathiTrust (1911–1913). 5 vols: v.1: A-Chrysos (1911); v.2: Church-Fusion (1911); v.3 (1912); v.4: Liberal-Polyhedron; v.5: Poly-Z + "Analytical indexes" (1913)
- Principles of Secondary Education (1914)
- Founding of the American public school system; a history of education in the United States, from the early settlements to the close of the civil war period (1940)

== See also ==
- The Inquiry
