= Jun Tosaka =

Japanese philosopher

- 戸坂 潤
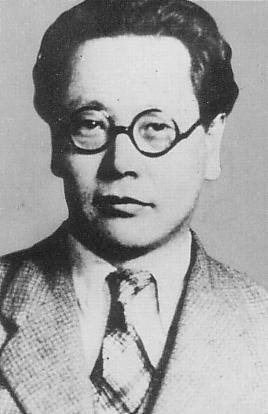
- Born: 27 September 1900; Tokyo, Japan
- Died: 9 August 1945 (aged 44); Nagano, Japan

Education
- Academic advisor: Nishida Kitarō

Philosophical work
- Era: 20th-century philosophy
- Region: Japanese philosophy
- School: Kyoto School; Japanese Marxism; Historical materialism
- Main interests: Critique, social criticism, anti-imperialism

Jun Tosaka (Japanese: 戸坂 潤, Hepburn: Tosaka Jun; 27 September 1900 – 9 August 1945) was a Shōwa era Kyoto-trained Japanese philosopher, intellectual and teacher. Some identify strands of Marxism in his later philosophy. His criticisms of governments and their war policies caused him to end up in prison on various occasions.

== Life ==
Jun Tosaka was born in Tokyo in 1900. Due to his mother's illness and his father's early death he was moved that same year with his nurse to live with his grandparents in Ishikawa Prefecture on the western side of the country. In September 1905 he returned to Tokyo where he grew up with his mother in the city's Kanda quarter (today part of Chiyoda).

He attended Kyoto Imperial University. He was interested in the works of Kitarō Nishida, and Hajime Tanabe, neo-Kantianism, and then Marxism. He was a member of the Kyoto School. In 1932, Tosaka participated in the creation of the "Society for the Study of Materialism" (Yuibutsuron Kenkyūkai, 唯物論研究会) and remained a leading representative of the society until its ban by the Japanese authorities in 1938. He was arrested in the same year under the Peace Preservation Law for his anti-war views. Tosaka died in Nagano Prison on the same day as the World War II atomic bombing of Nagasaki.
