= Seiichi Hatano =

Japanese philosopher

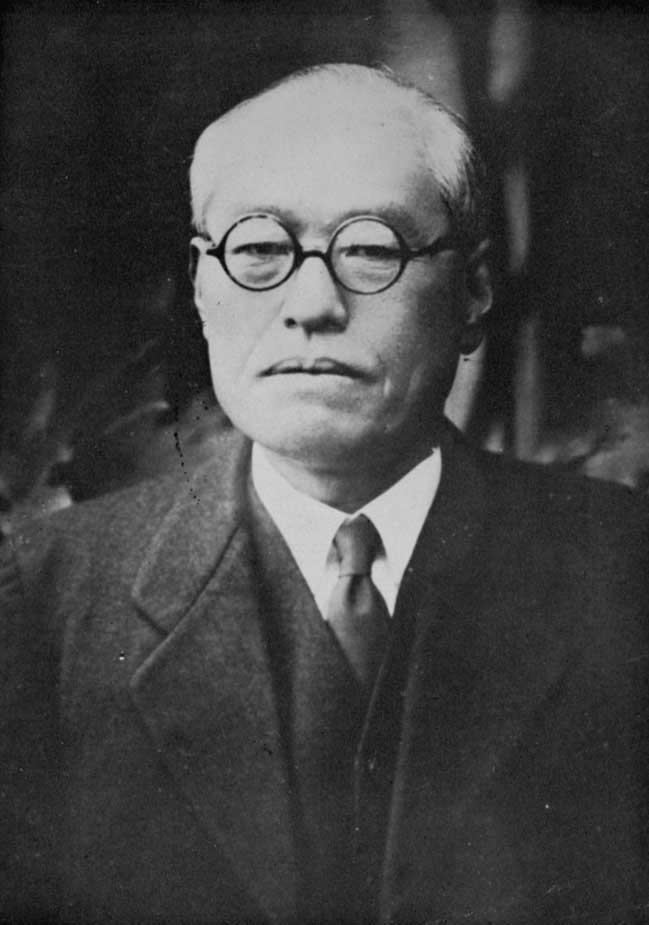
- Seiichi Hatano
- Born: July 21, 1877; Matsumoto, Nagano, Japan
- Died: January 17, 1950 (aged 72); Tokyo, Japan
- Occupation: Philosopher

Seiichi Hatano (波多野 精一, Hatano Seiichi; 21 July 1877 – 17 January 1950) was a Japanese philosopher, best known for his work in the philosophy of religion dealing mostly with western religion and also western philosophical thoughts in theological aspects of Christianity.

== Biography ==
Hatano was born in Matsumoto in Nagano Prefecture, and educated at Tokyo Imperial University, from which he graduated in 1899. He was very influential in stimulating the study in Japan of Western philosophy and religion, both through his teaching (he was the first to teach the history of Western philosophy at Tokyo Semmon Gakko, now Waseda University), and through his early writings. These included An Outline of the History of Western Philosophy (1897), The Origins of Christianity (1909), and A Study of Spinoza (1904–1905). The last of these was originally written in German and only translated into Japanese in 1910. It was reprinted after WW2.

He opposed a positivist approach to religion, arguing that though rationality underpinned religious beliefs, it depended upon an autonomous form of experience to discover at least partial truth.

He died in Tokyo at the age of seventy-three.

== Bibliography ==
- 1897: An Outline of the History of Western Philosophy
- 1909: The Origins of Christianity
- 1904: A Study of Spinoza
- 1920: The Essence of the Philosophy of Religion and Its Fundamental Problems
- 1935: Philosophy of Religion
- 1940: Introduction to the Philosophy of Religion
- 1943: Time and Eternity
