= Kyoto School =

Japanese philosophical movement

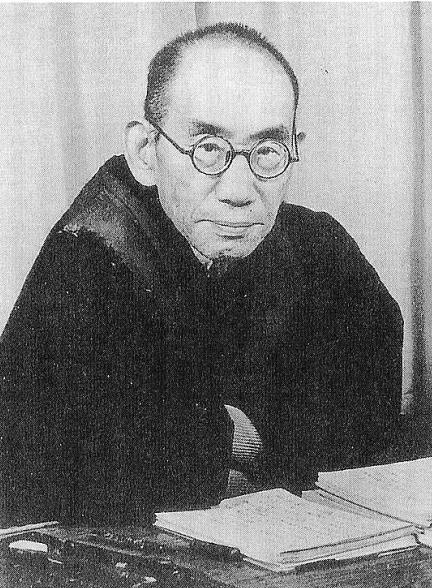
Kitarō Nishida, considered the founder of the Kyoto School of philosophical thought, c. 1943

The Kyoto School (京都学派, Kyōto-gakuha) is the name given to the Japanese philosophical movement centered at Kyoto University that assimilated Western philosophy and religious ideas and used them to reformulate religious and moral insights unique to the East Asian philosophical tradition. However, it is also used to describe postwar scholars who have taught at the same university, been influenced by the foundational thinkers of Kyoto school philosophy, and who have developed distinctive theories of Japanese uniqueness. To disambiguate the term, therefore, thinkers and writers covered by this second sense appear under The Kyoto University Research Centre for the Cultural Sciences.

Beginning roughly in 1913 with Kitarō Nishida, it survived the serious controversy it garnered after World War II to develop into a well-known and active movement. However, it is not a "school" of philosophy in the traditional sense of the phrase, such as with the Frankfurt School or Plato's Academy. Instead, the group of academics gathered around Kyoto University as a de facto meeting place. Its founder, Nishida, steadfastly encouraged independent thinking.

== Historiography ==
According to James Heisig, the name "Kyoto School" was first used in 1932 by a student of Nishida and Hajime Tanabe. Jun Tosaka considered himself to be part of the 'Marxist left-wing' of the school. However, as Professor Montserrat Crespín Perales has demonstrated, six years prior to the publication of Tosaka’s article, another philosopher, Tsuchida Kyōson (1891–1934), had already grouped Nishida and Tanabe under the name “Kyoto School,” likely echoing a designation that was circulating within Japanese academic circles. This nomenclature appears in his book Study of Contemporary Japanese and Chinese Thought (Nihon Shina Gendai Shisō Kenkyū) (1926), which the thinker himself later translated into English as Contemporary Thought of Japan and China (1927). Afterwards, the media and academic institutions outside Japan began to use the term. By the 1970s it had become a universally accepted term.

== History ==
Masao Abe writes in his introduction to a new English translation of Nishida's magnum opus that if one thinks of philosophy in terms of Kant or Hegel, then there is no philosophy taking place in Japan. But if it is instead thought of in the tradition carried out by Augustine and Kierkegaard, then Japan has a rich philosophical history, composed of the great thinkers Kūkai, Shinran, Dōgen, and others.

The group of philosophers involved with the Kyoto School in its nearly 100-year history is a diverse one. Members often come from very different social backgrounds. At the same time, in the heat of intellectual debate they did not hesitate to criticise each other's work.

The following criteria roughly characterize the features of this school:

1. Teaching at Kyoto University or at a nearby affiliated school.
2. Sharing some basic assumptions about using Asian thought in the framework of Western philosophical tradition.
3. Introducing and rationally investigating the meaning of "nothingness" and its importance in the history of philosophical debate.
4. Expanding on the philosophical vocabulary introduced by Nishida.

Generally, most were strongly influenced by the German philosophical tradition, especially the thought of Kant, Hegel, Nietzsche, and Heidegger. In addition, many employed their cultural resources in formulating their philosophy and bringing it to play to add to the philosophical enterprise.

While their work was not expressly religious it was informed significantly by it. For example, Hajime Tanabe and Keiji Nishitani wrote on Christianity and Buddhism and identified common elements between the religions. For this reason, some scholars classify the intellectual products of the school as "religious philosophy."

Although the group was fluid and largely informal, traditionally whoever occupied the Chair of the Department of Modern Philosophy at the University of Kyoto was considered its leader. Nishida was the first, from 1913 to 1928. Hajime Tanabe succeeded him until the mid-1930s. By this time, Nishitani had graduated from Kyoto University, studied with Martin Heidegger for two years in Germany, and returned to a teaching post since 1928. From 1955 to 1963, Nishitani officially occupied the Chair. Since his departure, leadership of the school crumbled — turning the movement into a very decentralized group of philosophers with common beliefs and interests.

== Significance of its notable members ==
The significance of the group continues to grow, especially in American departments of religion and philosophy. Since the mid-1980s, there has been a growing interest in East/West dialogue, especially inter-faith scholarship. Masao Abe traveled to both coasts of the United States on professorships and lectured to many groups on Buddhist-Christian relations.

The Kyoto School of Philosophy also influenced education in Japan, giving rise to the Kyoto School of Education. Nishida had various writings such as "On Education" (1933) and deeply influenced his student, philosopher of education Kimura Motomori. Kimura in turn taught Mori Akira (also the student of Tanabe), who connected the Kyoto School's ideas to pragmatism and moral education. Through these figures, the ideas of the Kyoto School spread to philosophy of education and even educational practice.

Although Daisetsu Teitarō Suzuki was closely connected to the Kyoto School and in some ways critical to the development of thought that occurred there — he personally knew Nishida, Tanabe, and Nishitani — he is not considered a true member of the group.

Tetsurō Watsuji became a lecturer at Kyoto Imperial University, joining Nishida Kitaro, Tanabe Hajime and Nishitani Keiji. While Watsuji joined their department, he is not typically considered a member of the Kyoto School owing to the intellectual independence in his work.

=== Kitarō Nishida ===
Kitarō Nishida, the school's founder, is most known for his groundbreaking work An Inquiry into the Good and later for his elucidation of the "logic of basho" (Japanese: 場所; usually translated as "place," or the Greek τόπος topos). This brought him fame outside Japan and contributed largely to the attention later paid to philosophers from the Kyoto School.

Nishida's work is notable for a few reasons. Chief among them is how much they are related to the German tradition of philosophy since Schopenhauer. The logic of basho is a non-dualistic 'concrete' logic, meant to overcome the inadequacy of the subject-object distinction essential to the subject logic of Aristotle and the predicate logic of Kant, through the affirmation of what he calls the 'absolutely contradictory self-identity' — a dynamic tension of opposites that, unlike the dialectical logic of Hegel, does not resolve in a synthesis. Rather, it defines its proper subject by maintaining the tension between affirmation and negation as opposite poles or perspectives.

Nishitani describes East Asian philosophy as something very different from what the Western tradition of Descartes, Leibniz or Hume would indicate.

It is 'intuitive and practical,' with its emphasis on religious aspects of experience not lending themselves readily to theoretical description. True wisdom is to be distinguished from intellectual understanding of the kind appropriate to the sciences. The 'appropriation' of Nishida's thought...'embraces difficulties entirely different from those of intellectual understanding'...and those who 'pretend to understand much but do not really understand, no matter how much they intellectually understand' are the object of his scorn.

Nishida wrote The Logic of Place and the Religious Worldview, developing more fully the religious implications of his work and philosophy through "Absolute Nothingness," which "contains its own absolute self-negation within itself." By this Nishida means that while the divine is dynamically paradoxical, it should not be construed as pantheism or transcendent theism.

Nishitani and Abe spent much of their academic lives dedicated to this development of nothingness and the absolute.

=== Keiji Nishitani ===
Keiji Nishitani, one of Nishida's main disciples, became the doyen in the post-war period. Nishitani's works, such as his Religion and Nothingness, primarily dealt with the Western notion of nihilism, inherited from Nietzsche, and religious interpretation of nothingness, as found in the Buddhist idea of śūnyatā and the specifically Zen Buddhist concept of mu.

=== Tokuryū Yamauchi ===
Yamauchi Tokuryū was a disciple of Kitarō Nishida.

=== Shizuteru Ueda ===
Shizuteru Ueda was a disciple of Keiji Nishitani.

== Criticism ==
Today, there is a great deal of critical research into the school's role before and during the Second World War.

Hajime Tanabe bears the greatest brunt of the criticism for bringing his work on the "Logic of Species" into Japanese politics, which was used to buttress the militarist project to formulate imperialist ideology and propaganda. Tanabe's notion is that the logical category of "species" and nation are equivalent, and each nation or "species" provides a fundamental set of characteristics which define and determine the lives and outlooks of those who participate in it.

== Members ==
- Kitarō Nishida: 1870–1945 (KU Philosophy Dept. 1910–13, Chair 1913–28)
- Hajime Tanabe: 1885–1962 (KU Philosophy Dept.?, Chair, 1928–35?)
- Tomonaga Sanjūrō
- Keiji Nishitani: 1900–1990 (KU Philosophy Dept. 1928–35, Chair 1935–63)
- Kuki Shūzō
- Masao Abe
- Miki Kiyoshi
- Jun Tosaka
- Hisamatsu Shin'ichi
- Shizuteru Ueda
- Saneshige Komaki
- Tokuryū Yamauchi
- Takeuchi Yoshinori

== Bibliography ==
Scholarly books

- The Buddha Eye: An Anthology of the Kyoto School. Edited by Frederick Franck. New York: Crossroad Publishing, 1982.

—Seventeen essays, most from The Eastern Buddhist, on Zen and Pure Land Buddhism.

- Kyoto School Philosophy: A Call for a Paradigm Shift in Philosophical Thought, by Horo Atsuhiko. Nanzan Bulletin 16, 1992, pp. 15–32.
- The Philosophy of the Kyoto School, edited by Fujita Masakatsu. 2001.

—Anthology of texts by Kyoto scholars themselves, with additional biographical essays.

- The Thought of the Kyoto School, edited by Ohashi Ryosuke. 2004.

—Collection of essays dealing with the history of its name, and its members contributions to philosophy.

- Carter, Robert E.; Kasulis, Thomas P. (2013). The Kyoto School: An Introduction. Albany, New York: SUNY Press. ISBN 978-1-4384-4541-0.
- Philosophers of Nothingness, by James Heisig. Honolulu: University of Hawaii Press, 2001. ISBN 0-8248-2481-4

—Excellent introduction to the School's history and content; includes rich multilingual bibliography.

- Absolute Nothingness: Foundations for a Buddhist-Christian Dialogue, Hans Waldenfels. New York: Paulist Press, 1980.

—Good early work, focuses mostly on Nishitani's relevance for the perspective of Buddhist-Christian dialogue.

- James W. Heisig, John C. Maraldo (Ed.): "Rude Awakenings. Zen, the Kyoto School, & the Question of Nationalism", Honolulu: University of Hawaii Press, 1994.
- Crespín Perales, Montserrat, y Wirtz, Fernando (eds) (2023). Después de la nada. Dialéctica e ideología en la filosofía japonesa contemporánea. Barcelona: Herder.

Journal articles

- "The Religious Philosophy of the Kyoto School: An Overview," by James Heisig. Japanese Journal of Religious Studies Vol.17, No.1 (1990), pp. 51–81.
- "Heidegger and Buddhism," by T. Umehara. Philosophy East and West, Vol.20 (1970), pp. 271–281.
- "Nishida's Philosophy of 'Place'," by Masao Abe, International Philosophical Quarterly Vol.28, No.4 (Winter 1988), pp. 355–371.
- "In Memoriam: Keiji Nishitani (1900-1990)," by E. Kawamura-Hanoka. Buddhist-Christian Studies, Vol.12 (1992), pp. 241–245.
- Crespín Perales, Montserrat (2024). The Denomination" Kyoto School” in the Work of Tsuchida Kyōson (1891-1934) Contemporary Thought of Japan and China (1926, 1927)

=== Readings by members ===
- For further information, see the Nanzan Institute's Bibliography for all Kyoto School members.
- Kitaro Nishida, An Inquiry into the Good, translated by Masao Abe and Christopher Ives. New Haven: Yale University Press, 1987 (1921).
- ——, Art and Morality, translated by D. Dilworth and Valdo Viglielmo. Honolulu: University of Hawaii Press, 1973.
- ——, Intelligibility and the Philosophy of Nothingness, translated by Robert Schinzinger. Westport: 1958.
- Tanabe, Hajime, "Demonstratio of Christianity", in Introduction to the Philosophy of Tanabe: According to the English Translation of the Seventh Chapter of the Demonstration of Christianity, translated by Makoto Ozaki, Rodopi Bv Editions, January 1990, ISBN 90-5183-205-2,ISBN 978-90-5183-205-1, ASIN B0006F1CBU.
- ——, "The Logic of the Species as Dialectics," trns. David Dilworth; Taira Sato, in Monumenta Nipponica, Vol. 24, No. 3, 1969, pp. 273–288.
- ——, Philosophy as Metanoetics (Nanzan Studies in Religion and Culture), Yoshinori Takeuchi, Valdo Viglielmo, and James W. Heisig (Translators), University of California Press, April 1987, ISBN 0-520-05490-3.
- Keiji Nishitani, Religion and Nothingness, Berkeley: University of California Press, 1982. ISBN 0-520-04946-2
- ——, The Self-Overcoming of Nihilism, translated by Graham Parkes and Setsuko Aihara. Albany: State University of New York Press, 1990.
- Yoshinori Takeuchi, The Heart of Buddhism, translated by James Heisig. New York: 1983.

=== Secondary sources on members ===
- Nishida Kitaro, by Nishitani Keiji, translated by Yamamoto Sesaku and James Heisig. Berkeley: University of California Press, 1991.
- The Religious Philosophy of Tanabe Hajime, edited by Taitetsu Unno and James Heisig. Berkeley: University of California Press, 1990.
- The Religious Philosophy of Nishitani Keiji, edited by Taitetsu Unno. Berkeley: University of California Press, 1990.
