= Non-philosophy =

Concept by François Laruelle

Non-philosophy (French: non-philosophie) is a concept popularized by French philosopher François Laruelle.

== Precursors ==
German philosopher Adolph Carl August von Eschenmayer developed an early approach to philosophy called non-philosophy (German: Nichtphilosophie). He defined it as a kind of mystical illumination by which was obtained a belief in God that could not be reached by mere intellectual effort. He carried this tendency to mysticism into his physical researches, and was led by it to take a deep interest in the phenomena of animal magnetism. He ultimately became a devout believer in demoniacal and spiritual possession; and his later writings are all strongly impregnated with supernaturalism. Laruelle sees Eschenmayer's doctrine as a "break with philosophy and its systematic aspect in the name of passion, faith, and feeling".

Japanese Kyoto school philosopher Hajime Tanabe advanced another early notion on non-philosophy in his 1945 tome Philosophy as Metanoetics. Drawing on his earlier studies of Western philosophy, Hajime took inspiration from Shin Buddhism to conceive of "a philosophy that is not a philosophy" in which the limitations of speculative reason would be recognized and transcended, avoiding both idealism and materialism. Hajime emphasized this non-philosophy ("metanoetics") as defined not by the "self-power" of the philosopher but by a mediating "Other-power" (or "absolute nothingness") through which philosophizing could be newly possible.

== Non-philosophy according to Laruelle ==
Laruelle argues that all forms of philosophy (from ancient philosophy to analytic philosophy to deconstruction and so on) are structured around a prior decision, and remain constitutively blind to this decision. The 'decision' that Laruelle is concerned with here is the dialectical splitting of the world in order to grasp the world philosophically. Examples from the history of philosophy include Immanuel Kant's distinction between the synthesis of manifold impressions and the faculties of the understanding; Martin Heidegger's split between the ontic and the ontological; and Jacques Derrida's notion of différance/presence. The reason Laruelle finds this decision interesting and problematic is because the decision itself cannot be grasped (philosophically grasped, that is) without introducing some further scission.

Laruelle further argues that the decisional structure of philosophy can only be grasped non-philosophically. In this sense, non-philosophy is a science of philosophy. Non-philosophy is not metaphilosophy because, as Laruelle scholar Ray Brassier notes, "philosophy is already metaphilosophical through its constitutive reflexivity". Brassier also defines non-philosophy as the "theoretical practice of philosophy proceeding by way of transcendental axioms and producing theorems which are philosophically uninterpretable". The reason why the axioms and theorems of non-philosophy are philosophically uninterpretable is because, as explained, philosophy cannot grasp its decisional structure in the way that non-philosophy can.

Laruelle's non-philosophy, he claims, should be considered to philosophy what non-Euclidean geometry is to the work of Euclid. It stands in particular opposition to philosophical heirs of Jacques Lacan such as Alain Badiou.

Laruelle scholar Ekin Erkan, elucidating on Laruelle's system, notes that "'non-philosophy' [...] withdraws from the metaphysical precept of separating the world into binarisms, perhaps epitomized by the formative division between 'universals” and “particulars' in Kant’s Transcendental Deduction. Laruelle’s method also rejects the 'evental' nature of Being described by Heiddegger [...] Laruelle's 'One' is understood as generic identity - an identity/commonality that reverses the classical metaphysics found in philosophy’s bastion thinkers (a lineage that runs from Plato to Badiou), where the transcendental is upheld as a necessary precondition for grounding reality.""

=== Role of the subject ===
The decisional structure of philosophy is grasped by the subject of non-philosophy. Laruelle's concept of "the subject" here is not the same as the subject-matter, nor does it have anything to do with the traditional philosophical notion of subjectivity. It is, instead, a function along the same lines as a mathematical function.

The concept of performativity (taken from speech act theory) is central to the idea of the subject of non-philosophy. Laruelle believes that both philosophy and non-philosophy are performative. However, philosophy merely performatively legitimates the decisional structure which, as already noted, it is unable to fully grasp, in contrast to non-philosophy which collapses the distinction (present in philosophy) between theory and action. In this sense, non-philosophy is radically performative because the theorems deployed in accordance with its method constitute fully-fledged scientific actions. Non-philosophy, then, is conceived as a rigorous and scholarly discipline.

The role of the subject is a critical facet of Laruelle's non-ethics and Laruelle's political system. "By problematizing what he terms 'The Statist Ideal,' or the 'Unitary Illusion' - be it negative (Hegel) or positive (Nietzsche) - Laruelle interrogates the 'scission' of the minority subject, which he contends is a “symptom” of the Western dialectic practice. In opposition to the Kantian first principles upon which both Continental and Analytic philosophy rest, Laruelle attempts to sketch a 'real Critique of Reason' that is determined in itself and through itself; insofar as this involves Laruellean 'non-ethics,' this involves breaking from the long-situated practice of studying the State from the paralogism of the State view, itself."

=== Radical immanence ===
The radically performative character of the subject of non-philosophy would be meaningless without the concept of radical immanence. The philosophical doctrine of immanence is generally defined as any philosophical belief or argument which resists transcendent separation between the world and some other principle or force (such as a creator deity). According to Laruelle, the decisional character of philosophy makes immanence impossible for it, as some ungraspable splitting is always taking place within. By contrast, non-philosophy axiomatically deploys immanence as being endlessly conceptualizable by the subject of non-philosophy. This is what Laruelle means by "radical immanence". The actual work of the subject of non-philosophy is to apply its methods to the decisional resistance to radical immanence which is found in philosophy.

=== Sans-philosophie ===
In "A New Presentation of Non-Philosophy" (2004), François Laruelle states:

I see non-philosophers in several different ways. I see them, inevitably, as subjects of the university, as is required by worldly life, but above all as related to three fundamental human types. They are related to the analyst and the political militant, obviously, since non-philosophy is close to psychoanalysis and Marxism — it transforms the subject by transforming instances of philosophy. But they are also related to what I would call the ‘spiritual′ type — which it is imperative not to confuse with ‘spiritualist′. The spiritual are not spiritualists. They are the great destroyers of the forces of philosophy and the state, which band together in the name of order and conformity. The spiritual haunt the margins of philosophy, Gnosticism, mysticism, and even of institutional religion and politics. The spiritual are not just abstract, quietist mystics; they are for the world. This is why a quiet discipline is not sufficient, because man is implicated in the world as the presupposed that determines it. Thus, non-philosophy is also related to Gnosticism and science-fiction; it answers their fundamental question — which is not at all philosophy's primary concern — ‘Should humanity be saved? And how?’ And it is also close to spiritual revolutionaries such as Müntzer and certain mystics who skirted heresy. When all is said and done, is non-philosophy anything other than the chance for an effective utopia?"

Numbered amongst the early members or sympathizers of sans-philosophie ("without philosophy") are those included in a collection published in 2005 by L’Harmattan: François Laruelle, Jason Barker, Ray Brassier, Laurent Carraz, Hugues Choplin, Jacques Colette, Nathalie Depraz, Oliver Feltham, Gilles Grelet, Jean-Pierre Faye, Gilbert Hottois, Jean-Luc Rannou, Pierre A. Riffard, Sandrine Roux and Jordanco Sekulovski. Since then, a slew of translations and new introductions have appeared from John Ó Maoilearca (Mullarkey), Anthony Paul Smith, Rocco Gangle, Katerina Kolozova, and Alexander Galloway.

== See also ==
- Antiphilosophy
- Henology
- Nondualism
- Félix Ravaisson-Mollien—Laruelle wrote a book on him in 1971
