= Hajime Tanabe =

Japanese philosopher

- 田辺 元
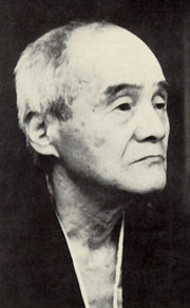
- Born: February 3, 1885; Tokyo, Japan
- Died: April 29, 1962 (aged 77); Karuizawa, Japan
- Awards: Order of Culture

Education
- Education: Tokyo Imperial University

Philosophical work
- Era: 20th-century philosophy
- Region: Japanese philosophy
- School: Kyoto School; Existentialism
- Institutions: Tohoku Imperial University; Kyoto Imperial University
- Main interests: Philosophy of science, philosophy of mathematics, philosophy of physics, metaphysics, philosophy of religion
- Notable works: "The Logic of Species and the World Schema", Philosophy as a Way to Repentance: Metanoetics
- Notable ideas: Metanoetics; logic of species; Buddhist–Christian dialogue

Hajime Tanabe (田辺 元, Tanabe Hajime; February 3, 1885 – April 29, 1962) was a Japanese philosopher of science, particularly of mathematics and physics. His work brought together elements of Buddhism, scientific thought, Western philosophy, Christianity, and Marxism. In the postwar years, Tanabe coined the concept of metanoetics, proposing that the limits of speculative philosophy and reason must be surpassed by metanoia.

Tanabe was a key member of what has become known in the West as the Kyoto School, alongside philosophers Kitarō Nishida (also Tanabe's teacher) and Keiji Nishitani. He taught at Tōhoku Imperial University beginning in 1913 and later at Kyōto Imperial University, and studied at the universities of Berlin, Leipzig, and Freiburg in the 1920s under figures such as Edmund Husserl and Martin Heidegger. In 1947 he became a member of the Japan Academy, and in 1950 he received the Order of Cultural Merit.

== Biography ==
Tanabe was born on February 3, 1885, in Tokyo to a household devoted to education. His father, the principal of Kaisei Academy, was a scholar of Confucius, whose teachings may have influenced Tanabe's philosophical and religious thought. Tanabe enrolled at Tokyo Imperial University, first as a mathematics student before moving to literature and philosophy. After graduation, he worked as a lecturer at Tohoku University and taught English at Kaisei Academy.

In 1916, Tanabe translated Henri Poincaré’s La Valeur de la Science. In 1918, he received his doctorate from Kyoto Imperial University with a dissertation entitled ‘Investigations into the Philosophy of Mathematics’ (predecessor to the 1925 book with the same title).

In 1919, at Nishida’s invitation, Tanabe accepted the position of associate professor at Kyoto Imperial University. From 1922 to 23, he studied in Germany — first, under Alois Riehl at the University of Berlin and then under Edmund Husserl at the University of Freiburg. At Freiburg, he befriended the young Martin Heidegger and Oskar Becker. One can recognise the influence of these philosophers in Tanabe.

In September 1923, soon after the Great Kantō Earthquake, the Home Ministry ordered his return, so Tanabe used the little time he had left — about a couple of months — to visit London and Paris, before boarding his return ship at Marseille. He arrived back in Japan in 1924.

In 1928, Tanabe translated Max Planck’s 1908 lecture, ‘Die Einheit des physikalischen Weltbildes’ for the Philosophical Essays [哲学論叢] translation series, which he co-edited, for his publisher Iwanami Shoten.

After Nishida's retirement from teaching in 1928, Tanabe succeeded him. Though they began as friends, and shared several philosophical concepts such as the absolute nothing [絶対無], Tanabe became increasingly critical of Nishida's philosophy. Many of Tanabe's writings after Nishida left the university obliquely attacked the latter's philosophy.

In 1935, Tanabe published his essay The Logic of Species and the World Schema wherein he formulated his own ‘logic of species’ for which he became known.

During the Japanese expansion and war effort, Tanabe worked with Nishida and others to maintain the right for free academic expression. Though he criticized the Nazi-inspired letter of Heidegger, Tanabe himself was caught up in the Japanese war effort, and his letters to students going off to war exhibit many of the same terms and ideology used by the reigning military powers. Even more damning are his essays written in defense of Japanese racial and state superiority, exploiting his theory of the logic of species to herald and abet the militaristic ideology. This proposed dialectic argued that every contradictory opposition is to be mediated by a third term in the same manner a species mediates a genus and an individual.

During the war years, however, Tanabe wrote and published little, perhaps reflecting the moral turmoil that he attests to in his monumental post-war work, Philosophy as Metanoetics. The work is framed as a confession of repentance (metanoia) for his support of the war effort. It purports to show a philosophical way to overcome philosophy itself, which suggests that traditional Western thought contained seeds of the ideological framework that led to World War II.

His activities, and the actions of Japan as a whole, haunted Tanabe for the rest of his life. In 1951, he writes:

But as the tensions of World War II grew ever more fierce and with it the regulation of thinking, weak-willed as I was, I found myself unable to resist and could not but yield to some degree to the prevalent mood, which is a shame deeper than I can bear. The already blind militarism had led so many of our graduates precipitously to the battlefields; among the fallen were more than ten from philosophy, for which I feel the height of responsibility and remorse. I can only lower my head and earnestly lament my sin.

He lived for another eleven years after writing these words, dying in 1962 in Kita-Karuizawa, Japan.

== Thought ==
As James Heisig and others note, Tanabe and other members of the Kyoto School accepted the Western philosophical tradition stemming from the Greeks. This tradition attempts to explain the meaning of human experience in rational terms. This sets them apart from other Eastern writers who, though thinking about what life means and how best to live a good life, spoke in religious terms.

Although the Kyoto School used Western philosophical terminology and rational exploration, they made these items serve the purpose of presenting a unique vision of reality from within their cultural heritage. Specifically, they could enrich a discussion of the ultimate nature of reality using the experience and thought of various forms of Buddhism like Zen and Pure Land, but embedded in an analysis that calls upon conceptual tools forged and honed in western philosophy by thinkers ranging from Plato to Descartes to Heidegger.

Tanabe's own contribution to this dialog between Eastern and Western philosophy ultimately sets him apart from the other members of the Kyoto School. His radical critique of philosophical reason and method, while stemming from Immanuel Kant and Søren Kierkegaard, which emerges in his work Philosophy as Metanoetics, easily sets him as a major thinker with a unique position on perennial philosophical questions. Some commentators, for example, suggest that Tanabe's work in metanoetics is a forerunner of deconstruction.

Tanabe engaged with philosophers of Continental philosophy, especially Existentialism. His work is often a dialogue with philosophers like Kierkegaard, Friedrich Nietzsche, and Heidegger. Because of his engaging these thinkers, especially the first two, Tanabe's thought has been characterized as Existentialist, though Makoto Ozaki writes that Tanabe preferred the terms "existentialist philosophy of history", or "historical existentialism". In his masterpiece, Philosophy as Metanoetics, Tanabe characterized his work as "philosophy that is not a philosophy", foreshadowing various approaches to thinking by deconstructionists.

Like other existentialists, Tanabe emphasizes the importance of philosophy as being meaning; that is, what humans think about and desire is finding a meaning to life and death. In company with the other members of the Kyoto School, Tanabe believed that the foremost problem facing humans in the modern world is the lack of meaning and its consequent Nihilism. Jean-Paul Sartre, following Kierkegaard in his Concept of Anxiety, was keen to characterize this as Nothingness. Heidegger, as well, appropriated the notion of Nothingness in his later writings.

The Kyoto School philosophers believed that their contribution to this discussion of Nihilism centered on the Buddhist-inspired concept of nothingness, aligned with its correlate Śūnyatā. Tanabe and Nishida attempted to distinguish their philosophical use of this concept, however, by calling it Absolute Nothingness. This term differentiates it from the Buddhist religious concept of nothingness, as well as underlines the historical aspects of human existence that they believed Buddhism does not capture.

Tanabe disagreed with Nishida and Nishitani on the meaning of Absolute Nothingness, emphasizing the practical, historical aspect over what he termed the latter's intuitionism. By this, Tanabe hoped to emphasize the working of Nothingness in time, as opposed to an eternal now. He also wished to center the human experience in action rather than contemplation, since he thought that action embodies a concern for ethics whereas contemplation ultimately disregards this, resulting in a form of monism, after the mold of Plotinus and Georg Wilhelm Friedrich Hegel. That is, echoing Kierkegaard's undermining in Philosophical Fragments of systematic philosophy from Plato to Baruch Spinoza to Hegel, Tanabe questions whether there is an aboriginal condition of preexisting awareness that can or must be regained to attain enlightenment.

Tanabe's insistence on this point is not simply philosophical and instead points again to his insistence that the proper mode of human being is action, especially ethics. However, he is critical of the notion of a pre-existing condition of enlightenment because he accepts the Kantian notion of radical evil, wherein humans exhibit an ineluctable propensity to act against their own desires for the good and instead perpetrate evil.

Tanabe's Demonstration of Christianity presents religion as a cultural entity in tension with the existential meaning that religion plays in individual lives. Tanabe uses the terms genus to represent the universality of form that all entities strive for, contrasting them with the stable, though ossified form they can become as species as social systems.

Tanabe contraposes Christianity and Christ, represented here as the opposition between Paul and Jesus. Jesus, in Tanabe's terms, is a historical being who manifests the action of Absolute Nothingness, or God understood in non-theistic terms. God is beyond all conceptuality and human thinking, which can only occur in terms of self-identity, or Being. God becomes, as manifested in human actions, though God can never be reduced to being, or self-identity.

For Tanabe, humans have the potential to realize compassionate divinity, Nothingness, through continual death and resurrection, by way of seeing their Nothingness. Tanabe believes that the Christian Incarnation narrative is important for explaining the nature of reality, since he believed Absolute Nothingness becoming human exemplifies the true nature of the divine, as well as exemplar to realization of human being in relationship to divinity. Jesus signifies this process in a most pure form, thereby setting an example for others to follow.

Ultimately, Tanabe chooses philosophy over religion, since the latter tends toward socialization and domestication of the original impulse of the religious action. Philosophy, understood as metanoetics, always remains open to questions and the possibility self-delusion in the form of radical evil. Therefore, Tanabe's statement is a philosophy of religion.

== Bibliography ==
=== Collected works ===
- Collected Works [田邊元全集], 15 Vols. (Chikuma Shobō [筑摩書房], 1963–64) [CW].
- Selected Philosophical Works [田辺元哲学選], 4 vols. (Iwanami Bunko [岩波文庫], 2010) [SPW].

=== Monographs ===
- Modern Natural Science [最近の自然科学] (Iwanami Shoten [岩波書店], November 1915), reprinted in CW2:1-153.
- Philosophy of Science [科学概論] (Iwanami Shoten [岩波書店], September 1918), reprinted in CW2:155-360.
- Kant’s Teleology [カントの目的論] (Iwanami Shoten [岩波書店], October 1924), reprinted in CW3:1-72.
- Investigations into the Philosophy of Mathematics [数理哲学研究] (Iwanami Shoten [岩波書店], May 1925), reprinted in CW2:361-661.
- Hegel’s Philosophy and the Dialectic [ヘーゲル哲学と辯證法] (Iwanami Shoten [岩波書店], January 1932), reprinted in CW3:73-369.
- General Philosophy [哲学通論] (Iwanami Shoten [岩波書店], December 1933), reprinted in CW3:371-522.
- The Two Sides to Natural Science Education [自然科学教育の両側面] (Monbushō [文部省], March 1937), reprinted in CW5:141-191.
- The Meaning of Historical Study [史学の意味] (Nippon Bunka Kyōkai Shuppanbu [日本文化協会出版部], August 1937), reprinted in CW8:33-91.
- Science as Morality [徳性としての科学] (Tokyo: Sūgakukyoku [数学局], August 1938), reprinted in CW5:329-83.
- My View of the Philosophy of Shōbōgenzō [正法眼蔵の哲学私観] (Iwanami Shoten [岩波書店], May 1939), reprinted in CW5:443-494.
- Between Philosophy and Science [哲学と科学の間] (Iwanami Shoten [岩波書店], November 1939), reprinted in CW5:193-327.
- Historical Reality [歴史的現実] (Iwanami Shoten [岩波書店], June 1940), reprinted in CW8:117-169.
- The Direction of Philosophy [哲学の方向] (Meguro Shoten [目黒書店], April 1941), reprinted in CW8:171-199.
- Philosophy as a Way to Repentance: Metanoetics [懺悔道としての哲学] (Iwanami Shoten [岩波書店], April 1946), reprinted in CW9:1-269 and SPW2:33-439.
- Urgent Matters for Political Philosophy [政治哲学の急務] (Chikuma Shobō [筑摩書房], June 1946), reprinted in CW8:323-395.
- Dialectic of the Logic of Species [種の論理の辯證法] (Akitaya [秋田屋], November 1947), reprinted in CW7:251-372.
- Existence, Love and Practice [実存と愛と実践] (Chikuma Shobō [筑摩書房], December 1947), reprinted in CW9:271-492.
- Dialectic of Christianity [キリスト教の辯證] (Chikuma Shobō [筑摩書房], June 1948), reprinted in CW10:1-269.
- Introduction to Philosophy: The Fundamental Problems of Philosophy [哲学入門——哲学の根本問題] (Chikuma Shobō [筑摩書房], March 1949), reprinted in CW11:1-132 and SPW3:11-216.
- The Fundamental Problems of Philosophy, Appendix 1: Philosophy of History and Political Philosophy [哲学の根本問題補説第一——歴史哲学・政治哲学] (Chikuma Shobō [筑摩書房], September 1949), reprinted in CW11:133-282.
- The Fundamental Problems of Philosophy, Appendix 2: Philosophy of Science and Epistemology [哲学の根本問題補説第二——科学哲学・認識論] (Chikuma Shobō, April 1950), reprinted in CW11:283-425.
- Valéry’s Aesthetics [ヴァレリイの芸術哲学] (Chikuma Shobō [筑摩書房], March 1951), reprinted in CW13:1-162.
- Fundamental Problems of Philosophy, Appendix 3: Philosophy of Religion and Ethics [哲学の根本問題補説第三——宗教哲学・倫理学] (Chikuma Shobō [筑摩書房], April 1952), reprinted in CW11:427-632.
- Historicist Development of Mathematics: A Memorandum on the Foundations of Mathematics [数理の歴史主義展開——数学基礎論覚書] (Chikuma Shobō [筑摩書房], November 1954), reprinted in CW12:209-334 and SPW3:217-399.

Tanabe’s magnum opus, in his own words the “final accounting” of his philosophy.

- Proposition of a New Methodology for Theoretical Physics: The Necessity of Theory of Functions of Complex Variables qua Method of Theoretical Physics and Its Topological Character [理論物理学新方法論提説——理論物理学の方法としての複素変数関数論の必然性とその位相学的性格] (Chikuma Shobō [筑摩書房], May 1955), reprinted in CW12:335-368.
- Dialectic of the Theory of Relativity [相対性理論の辯證法] (Chikuma Shobō [筑摩書房], October 1955), reprinted in CW12:369-402.
- A Memorandum on Mallarmé [マラルメ覚書] (Chikuma Shobō [筑摩書房], August 1961), reprinted in CW13:199-304 and SPW4:63-218.

=== Chronological list of works ===
1910

- ‘On Thetic Judgement’ [措定判断に就て] (Tetsugaku Zasshi [哲学雑誌], No. 283, September 1910), reprinted in CW1:1-10.

Tanabe develops Alois Riehl’s idea of »setzendes (thetisches) Urteil« from the latter’s Der philosophische Kriticismus und seine Bedeutung.

- ‘Critical Notice of Theodor Lipps’s Bewusstsein und Gegenstände’ [リップス氏『意識と対象』] (Tetsugaku Zasshi [哲学雑誌], No. 285, November 1910), reprinted in CW14:3-10.

1911

- ‘Critical Notice of Wilhelm Jerusalem’s Der kritische Idealismus und die reine Logik’ [イェルザレム氏の『批判的観念論と純粋論理学』] (Tetsugaku Zasshi [哲学雑誌], No. 292 and No. 293, June–July 1911), reprinted in CW14:11-32.

1912

- ‘The Problem of Relativity’ [相対性の問題] (Tetsugaku Zasshi [哲学雑誌], No. 302, April 1912), reprinted in CW14:33-48.
- ‘Kant and Natural Science’ [カントと自然科学] (Tetsugaku Zasshi [哲学雑誌], No. 306, August 1912), reprinted in CW14:49-60.
- ‘Critical Notice of Émile Boutroux’s De l’idée de loi naturelle dans la science et la philosophie contemporaines’ [ブートルー氏『自然法の観念』] (Tetsugaku Zasshi [哲学雑誌], No. 307, No. 308 and No. 309, September–November 1912), reprinted in CW14:61-104.
- ‘Critical Notice of Kuwaki Ayao’s ‘The Problem of Knowledge in Physics’’ [桑木理学士の『物理学上認識の問題』] (Tetsugaku Zasshi [哲学雑誌], No. 310, December 1912), reprinted in CW14:105-113.

1913

- ‘Critical Notice of Max Planck’s ‘Die Einheit des physkalischen Weltbildes’’ [プランク氏『物理学的世界形象の統一』] (Tetsugaku Zasshi [哲学雑誌], No. 313, No. 314 and No. 315, March–May 1913), reprinted in CW14:114-139.
- ‘Natorp’s Criticisms of the Principle of Relativity’ [相対性原理に対するナトルプ氏の批評] (Tetsugaku Zasshi [哲学雑誌], No. 318, August 1913), reprinted in CW14:140-152.
- ‘The Significance of Descriptions in the Epistemology of Physics: A Critique of Kirchhoff and Mach’ [物理学的認識に於ける記載の意義——キルヒホッフ及びマッハの批評] (Tetsugaku Zasshi [哲学雑誌], No. 319, September 1913), reprinted in CW1:11-26.

On the descriptivism of Kirchhoff and Mach.

- ‘Critical Notice of Henri Poincaré’s ‘L'espace et le temps’’ [ポアンカレ氏『空間と時間』] (Tetsugaku Zasshi [哲学雑誌], No. 322, December 1913), reprinted in CW14:153-164.

1914

- ‘The Limits of Logicism in Epistemology: A Critique of the Marburg and Freiburg Schools’ [認識論に於ける論理主義の限界——マールブルヒ派とフライブルヒ派の批評] (Tetsugaku Zasshi [哲学雑誌], No. 324 and No. 325, February–March 1914), reprinted in CW1:27-61.
- ‘On Kuwaki’s Essay on the Method of Physics’ [桑木理学士の物理学の方法に関する一論文] (Tetsugaku Zasshi [哲学雑誌], No. 325, March 1914), reprinted in CW14:165-168.
- ‘On the Existence of Mathematical Objects: Reading Medicus’ Essay’ [数学的対象の存在について——メディクスの論文を読む] (Tetsugaku Zasshi [哲学雑誌], No. 331, September 1914), reprinted in CW14:169-192.

The essay in question is Fritz Medicus, ‘Bemerkungen zum Problem der Existenz mathematischer Gegenstände’, Kant-Studien, 19:1-19.

1915

- ‘The Natural Sciences versus the Social and Cultural Sciences’ [自然科学対精神科学・文化科学] (Shinri Kenkyū [心理研究], No. 38, No. 39 and No. 40, February–April 1915), reprinted in CW1:63-93.
- ‘A Theory of Natural Numbers’ [自然数論] (Tetsugaku Zasshi [哲学雑誌], No. 337 and No. 338, March–April 1915), revised and reprinted in Investigations into the Philosophy of Mathematics.
- Modern Natural Science [最近の自然科学] (Iwanami Shoten [岩波書店], November 1915), reprinted in CW2:1-153.
- ‘Preface to the Third Printing of Modern Natural Science’ [『最近の自然科学』第三版の序] (Iwanami Shoten [岩波書店], December 1915), reprinted in CW14:193.

1916

- ‘Continuity, Derivative, Infinity’ [連続、微分、無限] (Tetsugaku Zasshi [哲学雑誌], No. 348, No. 349 and No. 351, February–May 1916), revised and reprinted in Investigations into the Philosophy of Mathematics.
- ‘On Universals’ [普遍に就いて] (Tetsugaku Kenkyū [哲学研究], No. 5, May 1916), reprinted in CW1:95-117.
- ‘Translator’s Preface to Poincaré, La valeur de la science’ [ポアンカレ『科学の価値』訳者序] (Iwanami Shoten [岩波書店], May 1916), reprinted in CW14:194-195.
- ‘Negative Numbers and Imaginary Numbers’ [負数及び虚数] (Tetsugaku Zasshi [哲学雑誌], No. 358 and No. 359, December 1916–January 1917), revised and reprinted in Investigations into the Philosophy of Mathematics.

1917

- ‘The Epistemology of Mathematics’ [数理の認識] (Tetsugaku Kenkyū [哲学研究], No. 13, April 1917), revised and reprinted in Investigations into the Philosophy of Mathematics.
- ‘Variables and Functions’ [変数及び函数] (Tetsugaku Zasshi [哲学雑誌], No. 363 and No. 364, May–June 1917), revised and reprinted in Investigations into the Philosophy of Mathematics.
- ‘Moral Freedom’ [道徳的自由] (Shichō [思潮], Vol. 1, No. 3 and No. 4, July–August 1917), reprinted in CW1:119-139.
- ‘The Theory of Time’ [時間論] (Tetsugaku Kenkyū [哲学研究], No. 17, August 1917), reprinted in CW1:141-171.

1918

- ‘The Logical Foundations of Geometry’ [幾何学の論理的基礎] (Tetsugaku Zasshi [哲学雑誌], No. 371, No. 372 and No. 373, January–March 1918), revised and reprinted in Investigations into the Philosophy of Mathematics.
- ‘The Problem of Philosophical Knowledge in German Idealism’ [ドイツ唯心論に於ける哲学的認識の問題] (Tetsugaku Kenkyū [哲学研究], No. 23 and No. 24, February–March 1918), reprinted in CW1:173-226.
- ‘Reading Dr. Sōda’s Problems in the Philosophy of Economics’ [左右田博士の著『経済哲学の諸問題』を読む] (Tetsugaku Kenkyū [哲学研究], No. 26, May 1918), reprinted in CW14:196-202.
- ‘The World of Infinity’ [無限の世界] (Shichō [思潮], Vol. 2, No. 5, August 1918), reprinted in CW1:227-234.
- ‘A Request to Dr. Sōda’s for Clarification regarding the Logic of Individual Causality’ [個別的因果律の論理に就きて左右田博士の教えを乞ふ] (Tetsugaku Kenkyū [哲学研究], No. 30, September 1918), reprinted in CW1:235-244.

Sōda replied with his ‘Awaiting Further Clarification from Dr. Tanabe regarding the Logic of Individual Causality’ [個別的因果律に関して更に田辺博士の教えを俟つ] (Tetsugaku Kenkyū [哲学研究], No. 32, November 1918).

- Philosophy of Science [科学概論] (Iwanami Shoten [岩波書店], September 1918), reprinted in CW2:155-360.
- ‘On Kant’s Theory of Freedom’ [カントの自由論に就いて] (Shichō [思潮], Vol. 2, No. 9, October 1918), reprinted in CW1:245-253.
- ‘The Significance of Leibniz’s Philosophy [ライプニッツ哲学の意義] (Tetsugaku Kenkyū [哲学研究], No. 32, November 1918), reprinted in CW1:255-284.
- ‘Lecture on Idealism’ [理想主義] (1918), reprinted in CW15:3-34.

1919

- ‘The Meaning of the Word ‘Truth’’ [眞といふ語の意味] (Shichō [思潮], Vol. 3, January 1919), reprinted in CW1:285-295.
- ‘Araragi's Tradition’ [アララギの伝統] (Araragi [アララギ], January 1919), reprinted in CW14:317-320.
- ‘On Consciousness as Such’ [「意識一般」に就て] (Tetsugaku Zasshi [哲学雑誌], No. 387, May 1919), reprinted in CW1:297-323.

On Kant’s notion of »Bewußtsein überhaupt«.

- ‘A Remark on Passages Quoted in Kihira’s Essay’ [紀平学士論文中の引用句に就き一言す] (Tetsugaku Zasshi [哲学雑誌], No. 391, September 1919), reprinted in CW14:203-204.
- ‘The Problem of the Subject of Knowledge’ [認識主観の問題] (Tetsugaku Kenkyū [哲学研究], No. 44, No. 47, No. 59, No. 63 and No. 68, November 1919–November 1921), reprinted in CW1:325-412.

1920

- ‘The Natural Sciences and the Social Sciences’ [自然科学と文化科学] (Shinano Kyōiku [信濃教育], February–March 1920), reprinted in CW14:253-83.
- ‘An Amateur's Opinion’ [素人の感想] (Araragi [アララギ], May 1920), reprinted in CW14:321-325.

1921

- ‘Tanka’ [短歌] (Araragi [アララギ], January–March, June–July, September 1921), reprinted in CW14:326-332.
- ‘Reading Shimaki Akahiko’s Hio’ [『永魚』を読む] (Araragi [アララギ], March 1921), reprinted in CW14:333-342.

1922

- ‘On Historical Knowledge’ [歴史の認識に就いて] (Shirin [史林], Vol. 7, No. 1, January 1922), reprinted in CW1:413-422.
- ‘The Concept of Culture’ [文化の概念] (Kaizō [改造], March 1922), reprinted in CW1:423-447.
- ‘The Infinite Continuity of Existence’ [実在の無限連続性] (Shisō [思想], No. 6, March 1922), reprinted in CW1:449-472.
- Entries in The Iwanami Dictionary of Philosophy [岩波哲学辞典] (Iwanami Shoten [岩波書店], October 1922), reprinted in CW15:419-67.

Archimedes’ axiom [アルキメデス公理]; Körper α [アルファ体]; Analysis situs [位置解析]; Ether [エーテル]; Energetic view of nature [エネルギー観]; Principle of conservation of energy [エネルギー保存則]; Action at a distance [遠隔作用]; Entropy [エントロピー]; Extensive quality [外延量]; Analysis [解析]; Analytical geometry [解析幾何学]; Critique of science [科学批判]; Reversible phenomenon [可逆現象]; Function [関数]; Mechanical view of nature [機械観]; Geometry [幾何学]; Pseudo-spherical space [擬球面空間]; Description [記述]; Descriptive school [記述学派]; Cardinal number [基数]; Series [級数]; Spherical space [球面空間]; Limit [極限]; Grenzpunkt [極限点]; Method of limit [極限法]; Grenzelement [極限要素]; Ortzeit [局所時]; Imaginary number [虚数]; Modern geometry [近世幾何学]; Space curvature [空間曲率]; Contingency [偶然]; Group [群]; Principle of permanence of formal laws [形式不易の原理]; Metrical geometry [計量幾何学]; Atomic theory [原子論]; Ausdehnungslehre [広遠論]; Theory of probability [公算論]; Postulate [公準]; Axiom [公理]; Axiomatic [公理主義]; Coordinates [座標]; Theory of economy of thought [思惟経済説]; Dimension [次元]; Quaternions [四元法]; Self-representation system [自己表現体系]; Natural science [自然科学]; Naturwissenschaftlich [自然科学的]; Natural number [自然数]; Gedankenexperiment [思想実験]; Real number [実数]; Mass [質量]; Projection [射影]; Projective geometry [射影幾何学]; Ordinal number [序数]; Number [数]; Mathematics [数学]; Mathematical [数学的]; Mathematical induction [数学的帰納法]; Mathematical formalism [数学的形式主義]; Mathematical realism [数学的実在論]; Mathematical nominalism [数学的唯名論]; Realm/Corpus of numbers [数体]; Number continuum [数連続体]; Arithmetisation [数論化]; Welt [世界]; Integral [積分]; Integer [整数]; Absolute space [絶対空間]; Absolute time [絶対時間]; Schnitt [切断]; Explanation [説明]; Exact sciences [精密科学]; Prime number [素数]; Theory of quanta [素量説]; Algebraic number [代数的数]; Field of force [力の場]; Transcendental number [超越的数]; Transfinite aggregate [超限集合]; Transfinite number [超限数]; Electromagnetic view of nature [電磁観/電磁的自然観]; Set of points [点集合]; Electron theory [電子論]; Punktmannigfaltigkeit [点複素体]; Point transformation [点変換]; Statistical mechanics [統計的力学]; Homogeneity [等質性]; Isotropy [等方性]; Intensive quantity [内包量]; First law of thermodynamics [熱力学第一法則]; Second law of thermodynamics [熱力学第二法則]; Physical theory of light [光の物理学的理論]; Differential [微分]; Differential coefficient [微分係数]; Infinitesimal method [微分法]; Differential equation [微分方程式]; Non-Euclidean geometry [非ユークリッド幾何学]; To represent [表現する]; Irreversible phenomenon [不可逆現象]; Complex number [複素数]; Negative number [負数]; Principle of conservation of matter [物質保存の原理]; Fourth state of matter [物質の第四態]; Disintegration of matter [物質変脱]; Physics [物理学]; Physical [物理的]; Invariant [不変式]; Mathesis universalis [普遍数学]; Fraction [分数]; Transformation [変換]; Variable [変数]; Parabolic space [放物線空間]; Elements at infinity [無窮遠要素]; Infinity [無限]; Irrational number [無理数]; Euclidean geometry [ユークリッド幾何学]; Rational number [有理数]; Dynamics/Mechanics [力学]; Riemann-Helmholtz geometry [リーマン・ヘルムホルツ幾何学]; Fluxion [流率]; Quantity [量]; Continuity [連続]; Lobachevsky-Bolyai geometry [ロバチェフスキィ・ボリヤイ幾何学]; Logistic/Algebra of logic [論理計算]; Vector analysis [ヴェクトル解析]

1924

- ‘Letter from Paris’ [巴里より] (Araragi [アララギ], January 1924), reprinted in CW14:343.
- ‘The Relationship Between Intuition and Thought in the Transcendental Deduction’ [先験演繹論に於ける直観と思惟との関係] (Shisō [思想], No. 30, April 1924), reprinted in CW4:1-16.
- ‘Kant’s Teleology’ [カントの目的論] (Tetsugaku Kenkyū [哲学研究], No. 99, No. 100 and No. 101, June–August 1924), revised and reprinted in Kant’s Teleology, CW3:1-72.
- ‘A New Turn in Phenomenology: Heidegger’s Phenomenology of Life’ [現象学に於ける新しき転向——ハイデッガーの生の現象学] (Shisō [思想], No. 36, October 1924), reprinted in CW4:17-34.
- Kant’s Teleology [カントの目的論] (Iwanami Shoten [岩波書店], October 1924), reprinted in CW3:1-72.
- ‘Reading Shimaki Akahiko’s Kadō Shōken’ [『歌道小見』を読む] (Araragi [アララギ], October 1924), reprinted in CW14:344-350.
- ‘Lecture on the Development of Phenomenology’ [現象学の発展] (1924–25), reprinted in CW15:35-153.

1925

- ‘Epistemology and Phenomenology’ [認識論と現象学] (Kōza [講座], No. 24 and No. 25, January–February 1925), reprinted in CW4:35-71.
- ‘Intuitive Knowledge and the Thing in Itself’ [直観知と物自体] (Tetsugaku Kenkyū [哲学研究], No. 109, No. 112 and No. 128, April 1925–November 1926), reprinted in CW4:73-139.

Intuitive knowledge as in Spinoza’s scientia intuitiva.

- Investigations into the Philosophy of Mathematics [数理哲学研究] (Iwanami Shoten [岩波書店], May 1925), reprinted in CW2:361-661.
- ‘On Shimaki Akahiko’s Taikyoshū’ [『太虗集』に就いて] (Araragi [アララギ], August 1925), reprinted in CW14:351-353.
- ‘Lask’s Logic’ [ラスクの論理] (Shisō [思想], No. 48, October 1925), reprinted in CW4:141-160.

1926

- ‘Reminiscences of Shimaki Akahiko’ [憶出] ((Araragi [アララギ], October 1926), reprinted in CW14:354-356.

1927

- ‘On Circular Reasoning in the Critical Method’ [批判的方法に於ける循環論に就いて] (Shisō [思想], No. 64, February 1927), reprinted in CW4:207-229.
- ‘The Logic of the Dialectic’ [辯證法の論理] (Tetsugaku Kenkyū [哲学研究], No. 132, No. 134, No. 136, No. 146, No. 152 and No. 162, March 1927-September 1929), revised and reprinted in Hegel’s Philosophy and the Dialectic, CW3:234-369.
- ‘Reflection’ [反省作用] (in Festschrift for Tokunō Bun [得能博士還暦記念哲学論文集], Iwanami Shoten [岩波書店], April 1927), reprinted in CW4:161-205.
- ‘On the Concept of Sensation’ [感覚の概念に就いて] (Shinrigaku Kenkyū [心理学研究], Vol. 2, No. 3, June 1927) reprinted in CW4:231-239.
- ‘Translator’s Preface to Planck, ‘Die Einheit des physkalischen Weltbildes’’ [プランク『物理学的世界像の統一』訳者小引] (Iwanami Shoten [岩波書店], July 1927), reprinted in CW14:205-206.
- ‘Blurb for Tsuchida Kyōson’s Studies on Contemporary Japanese and Chinese Thought’ [土田杏村『日本支那現代思想研究』について] (in Studies on Contemporary Japanese and Chinese Thought [日本支那現代思想研究], revised edition, Dai Ichi Shobō [第一書房], October 1927), reprinted in CW14:357-358.
- ‘Reminiscences of Sōda Ki’ichirō’ [左右田さんの思出] (Shisō [思想], October 1927), reprinted in CW14:359-374.

1928

- ‘Knowledge of the Past in the Study of History’ [史学に於ける過去の認識] (Tetsugaku Kenkyū [哲学研究], No. 142, January 1928), reprinted in CW4:241-256.
- ‘The Role of Concepts in the Historical Knowledge’ [歴史の認識に於ける概念の機能] (Shirin [史林], Vol. 13, No. 2, April 1928), reprinted in CW4:257-269.
- ‘The Location of Evidence’ [明證の所在] (Tetsugaku Zasshi [哲学雑誌], No. 500, October 1928), reprinted in CW4:271-286.
- ‘On Confucian Ontology’ [儒教的存在論について] (in Festschrift for Takase Takejirō [高瀬博士還暦記念支那学論叢], Iwanami Shoten [岩波書店], December 1928), reprinted in CW4:287-301.

1929

- ‘Action and History and Their Relation to the Dialectic’ [行為と歴史、及び辯證法のこれに対する関係] (Shisō [思想], No. 89, October 1929), revised and reprinted in Hegel’s Philosophy and the Dialectic, CW3:211-233.
- ‘On Shimaki Akahiko’s Art’ [島木さんの藝術] (in a catalogue for The Collected Works of Shimaki Akahiko [島木赤彦全集], Iwanami Shoten, 1929), reprinted in CW14:375.

1930

- ‘On the So-Called Class Aspect of Science’ [所謂「科学の階級性」に就いて] (Kaizō [改造], Vol. 12, No. 1, January 1930), reprinted in CW14:207-221.
- ‘A Request to Professor Nishida for Clarification’ [西田先生の教えを仰ぐ] (Tetsugaku Kenkyū [哲学研究], No. 170, May 1930), reprinted in CW4:303-328.

Tanabe’s famous critique of Nishida’s philosophy.

- ‘The Subject of Morality and Dialectical Freedom’ [道徳の主体と辯證法的自由] (Shisō [思想], No. 100, September 1930), revised and reprinted in Hegel’s Philosophy and the Dialectic, CW3:195-210.
- ‘The Significance of the New Physics’ World Picture’ [新物理学的世界像の意義] (Iwanami Kōza: Butsurigaku Oyobi Kagaku [岩波講座 物理学及び化学], October 1930), reprinted in CW14:222-238.

1931

- ‘The Identity of the Rational and the Real in Hegel’ [ヘーゲルに於ける理性的と現実的の一致] in Hegel and Hegelianism [ヘーゲルとヘーゲル主義], Iwanami Shoten [岩波書店], February 1931, revised and reprinted in Hegel’s Philosophy and the Dialectic, CW3:173-194.
- ‘Synthesis and Transcendence’ [綜合と超越] (in Festschrift for Tomonaga Sanjūrō [朝永博士還暦記念哲学論文集], Iwanami Shoten [岩波書店], April 1931), reprinted in CW4:329-353.
- ‘The Standpoint of Anthropology’ [人間学の立場] (Risō [理想], No. 27, October 1931), reprinted in CW4:355-382.
- ‘Hegel’s Philosophy and the Absolute Dialectic’ [ヘーゲル哲学と絶対辯證法] (Shisō [思想], No. 113, November 1931), revised and reprinted in Hegel’s Philosophy and the Dialectic, CW3:152-172.
- ‘Hegel’s Absolute Idealism’ [ヘーゲルの絶対観念論] (Tetsugaku Kenkyū [哲学研究], No. 189, December 1931), revised and reprinted in Hegel’s Philosophy and the Dialectic, CW3:85-135.
- ‘Understanding Hegel’s Theory of Judgement’ [ヘーゲル判断論の理解] (Tetsugaku Zasshi [哲学雑誌], No. 538, December 1931), revised and reprinted in Hegel’s Philosophy and the Dialectic, CW3:136-151.

1932

- Hegel’s Philosophy and the Dialectic [ヘーゲル哲学と辯證法] (Iwanami Shoten [岩波書店], January 1932), reprinted in CW3:73-369.
- ‘Dialectic of Individual Essence’ [個體的本質の辯證論] (in Spinoza and Hegel [スピノザとヘーゲル], Iwanami Shoten [岩波書店], July 1932), reprinted in CW4:383-415.
- ‘From the Time Schema to the World Schema’ [図式「時間」から図式「世界」へ] (Tetsugaku Kenkyū [哲学研究], No. 200, November 1932), reprinted in CW6:1-49.
- ‘Lecture on the Meaning of Dialectic’ [辯證法の意味] (1932-7), reprinted in CW15:155-234.

1933

- ‘The Way to Philosophy’ [哲学への通路] (Shisō [思想], No. 133, June 1933), reprinted in CW5:1-19.
- ‘Philosophy of Crisis or Crisis of Philosophy?’ [危機の哲学か哲学の危機か] (September 1933, unpublished), reprinted in CW8:1-9.
- General Philosophy [哲学通論] (Iwanami Shoten [岩波書店], December 1933), reprinted in CW3:371-522.

1934

- ‘The Relationship Between Mathematics and Philosophy’ [数学と哲学との関係] (Iwanami Kōza: Sūgaku [岩波講座 数学], May 1934), reprinted in CW5:21-57.
- ‘Re-Examining the Foundations of Mathematics: On Konno’s Essay’ [数学の基礎再吟味——今野氏の論文に因みて] (Kagaku [科学], Vol. 4, No. 8, August 1934), reprinted in CW14:239-245.
- ‘The Relationship Between Religion and Culture: On the Debate Between Barth and Brunner’ [宗教と文化の関係——バルトとブルンナーの論争に因みて] (Shisō [思想], No. 149 October 1934), reprinted in CW5:59-80.
- ‘On Intellectual Thought Today’ [現下の思想に就て] (Kyōdai Shimbun [京大新聞], November 1934), reprinted in CW14:376-379.
- ‘Remembering Nakamura Kenkichi’ [中村氏を悼む] (Araragi [アララギ], November 1934), reprinted in CW14:380-382.
- ‘The Logic of Social Existence’ [社会存在の論理] (Tetsugaku Kenkyū [哲学研究], No. 224, No. 225 and No. 226, November 1934–January 1935), reprinted in CW6:51-167 and SPW1:9-186.

1935

- ‘Quo Vadis’ [クオ・ワヂス] (Bungei Shunjū [文藝春秋], April 1935), reprinted in CW14:383-385.
- ‘Letter to Saitō Mokichi’ [齋藤茂吉氏へ] (in an essay collection on Saitō’s Kakinomoto no Hitomaro [柿本人磨]), Iwanami Shoten, May 1935), reprinted in CW14:386-387.
- ‘The Uniqueness of Iwanami Shoten’s Kokugo’ [岩波『國語』の特色] (Kokugo Tokuhō 2 [國語特報2], October 1935), reprinted in CW14:388-390.
- ‘The Logic of Species and the World Schema’ [種の論理と世界図式] (Tetsugaku Kenkyū [哲学研究], No. 235, No. 236 and No. 237, October–December 1935), reprinted in CW6:169-264 and SPW1:187-333.
- ‘The Third Stage of Ontology’ [存在論の第三段階] (Risō [理想], No. 76, November 1935), reprinted in CW6:265-298.

1936

- Entries in the Dictionary of Pedagogy [教育学辞典] (Iwanami Shoten [岩波書店], May 1936), reprinted in CW15:468-473.

Philosophy of mathematics [数理哲学]; Methodology [方法論]

- ‘Answer to the Questionnaire ‘What Do You Want the University’s Students to Read?’’ [アンケート「これは大学生に一讀させたし」に對して] (Kyōdai Shimbun [京大新聞], 20th September 1936), reprinted in CW14:391.
- ‘On Humanism’ [ヒューマニズムについて] (Shisō [思想], No. 173, October 1936), reprinted in CW5:81-92.
- ‘The Social Ontological Structure of Logic’ [論理の社会存在論的構造] (Tetsugaku Kenkyū [哲学研究], No. 247, No. 248 and No. 249, October–December 1936), reprinted in CW6:299-396.
- ‘The Development of Mathematics in the History of Thought’ [思想史的に見たる数学の発達] (in Mathematics as General Education [一般的教養としての数学について], Iwanami Shoten [岩波書店], November 1936), reprinted in CW5:93-140.

1937

- The Two Sides to Natural Science Education [自然科学教育の両側面] (Monbushō [文部省], March 1937), reprinted in CW5:141-191.
- ‘Response to Minoda’s and Matsuda’s Criticisms’ [蓑田氏及び松田氏の批判に答ふ] (Genri Nippon [原理日本], May 1937), reprinted in CW8:11-31.
- The Meaning of Historical Study [史学の意味] (Nippon Bunka Kyōkai Shuppanbu [日本文化協会出版部], August 1937), reprinted in CW8:33-91.
- ‘Response to Criticisms of the Logic of Species’ [種の論理に対する批評に答ふ] (Shisō [思想], No. 185, October 1937), reprinted in CW6:397-445.
- ‘Clarification of the Meaning of the Logic of Species’ [種の論理の意味を明にす] (Tetsugaku Kenkyū [哲学研究], No. 259, No. 260 and No. 261, October–December 1937), reprinted in CW6:447-521 and SPW1:335-448.

1938

- Science as Morality [徳性としての科学] (Tokyo: Sūgakukyoku [数学局], August 1938), reprinted in CW5:329-83.
- ‘Logic from Kant to Hegel’ [カントからヘーゲルへの論理] (in Festschrift for Hatano Sei’ichi [波多野精一先生献呈論文集], Iwanami Shoten [岩波書店], September 1938), reprinted in CW5:385-404.
- ‘The Expansion of Scientism’ [科学主義の拡充] (September 1938, unpublished), reprinted in CW8:93-103.
- ‘The Limits of Existentialist Philosophy’ [実存哲学の限界] (Tetsugaku Zasshi [哲学雑誌], No. 620, October 1938), reprinted in CW7:1-24.
- ‘My View on the Principle Underlying the Direction of Japan’s Cultural Policy Towards China’ [対支文化政策の指導原理に関する私見] (November–December 1938, unpublished), reprinted in CW8:105-116.

1939

- ‘On Scientific Thinking’ [科学思想について] (in Keisatsu Kanbu Yokuonkan Kōwaroku [警察幹部浴恩館講話録], May 1939), reprinted in CW14:284-314.
- My View of the Philosophy of Shōbōgenzō [正法眼蔵の哲学私観] (Iwanami Shoten [岩波書店], May 1939), reprinted in CW5:443-494.
- ‘Physics and Philosophy’ [物理学と哲学] (Iwanami Kōza: Butsurigaku [岩波講座 物理学], October 1939), reprinted in CW5:405-441.
- ‘The Logic of National Existence’ [国家的存在の論理] (Tetsugaku Kenkyū [哲学研究], No. 283, No. 284 and No. 285, October– December 1939), reprinted in CW7:25-99.
- Between Philosophy and Science [哲学と科学の間] (Iwanami Shoten [岩波書店], November 1939), reprinted in CW5:193-327.

1940

- Historical Reality [歴史的現実] (Iwanami Shoten [岩波書店], June 1940), reprinted in CW8:117-169.
- ‘Eternity, History, Action’ [永遠・歷史・行為] (Tetsugaku Kenkyū [哲学研究], No. 295, No. 296 and No. 297, October–December 1940), reprinted in CW7:101-170.
- ‘Ethics and Logic’ [倫理と論理] (Iwanami Kōza: Rinrigaku [岩波講座 倫理学], Vol. 4, November 1940), reprinted in CW7:171-209.

1941

- The Direction of Philosophy [哲学の方向] (Meguro Shoten [目黒書店], April 1941), reprinted in CW8:171-199.
- ‘The Morality of the State’ [国家の道義性] (Chūō Kōron [中央公論], October 1941), reprinted in CW8:201-219.
- ‘The Way of Patriotic Thinking’ [思想報国の道] (Kaizō [改造], October 1941), reprinted in CW8:221-241.
- ‘The Development of the Concept of Existence’ [実存概念の発展] (Tetsugaku Kenkyū [哲学研究], No. 307 and No. 309, October and December 1941), reprinted in CW7:211-251.
- Dialectic of the Logic of Species [種の論理の辯證法] (Akitaya [秋田屋], November 1947), reprinted in CW7:251-372.

1942

- ‘Lecture on Philosophy’ [哲学について] (1942), reprinted in CW15:235-247.

1943

- ‘Life and Death’ [死生] (May 1943, speech), reprinted in CW8:243-262.

1944

- ‘The Limits of Culture’ [文化の限界] (February 1944, speech), reprinted in CW8:263-305.
- ‘A Way to Repentance: Metanoetics’ [懺悔道——Metanoetik] (October 1944, first published in Kyūshin [求真], No. 15, 2008) and SPW2:11-31.

1945

- ‘Inayaga Shōkichi, The Foundational Concepts of Modern Mathematics, Vol. 1’ [彌永昌吉『現代数学基礎概念（上）』] (Kagaku [科学], Vol. 15, No. 2, October 1945), reprinted in CW14:246-249

1946

- ‘The Establishment of Democracy in Japan’ [日本民主主義の確立] (Chōryū [潮流], January 1946), reprinted in CW8:307-322.
- Philosophy as a Way to Repentance: Metanoetics [懺悔道としての哲学] (Iwanami Shoten [岩波書店], April 1946), reprinted in CW9:1-269 and SPW2:33-439.
- Urgent Matters for Political Philosophy [政治哲学の急務] (Chikuma Shobō [筑摩書房], June 1946), reprinted in CW8:323-395.
- ‘The Standpoint of the Absolute Nothing and the Materialist Dialectic’ [絶対無の立場と唯物辯證法——森宏一氏に答ふ] (Shinzenbi [真善美], August 1946), reprinted in CW8:397-409.
- ‘Lecture on Philosophical Thinking’ [哲学的思考] (1946), reprinted in CW15:249-286.

1947

- ‘The Present Task of the Intellectual Classes’ [知識階級現在の任務] (Chōryū [潮流], January 1947), reprinted in CW8:411-441.
- ‘Christianity, Marxism and Japanese Buddhism: Predictions for the Second Reformation’ [キリスト教とマルクシズムと日本仏教——第二次宗教改革の予想] (Tenbō [展望], No. 21, September 1947), reprinted in CW10:271-324.
- Dialectic of the Logic of Species [種の論理の辯證法] (Akitaya [秋田屋], November 1947), reprinted in CW7:251-372.
- Existence, Love and Practice [実存と愛と実践] (Chikuma Shobō [筑摩書房], December 1947), reprinted in CW9:271-492.

1948

- ‘A Theoretical Solution to Class Warfare’ [階級戦の理論的突破] (March 1948, unpublished), reprinted in CW8:443-462.
- Dialectic of Christianity [キリスト教の辯證] (Chikuma Shobō [筑摩書房], June 1948), reprinted in CW10:1-269.
- ‘Localised and Microscopic: Characteristics of Contemporary Thought’ [局所的微視的——現代的思考の特徴] (Tenbō [展望], No. 35, November 1948), reprinted in CW12:3-58.

1949

- Introduction to Philosophy: The Fundamental Problems of Philosophy [哲学入門——哲学の根本問題] (Chikuma Shobō [筑摩書房], March 1949), reprinted in CW11:1-132 and SPW3:11-216.
- ‘Dialectic of Classical Mechanics’ [古典力学の弁証法] (Kiso Kagaku [基礎科学], No. 2, April 1949), reprinted in CW12:59-131
- The Fundamental Problems of Philosophy, Appendix 1: Philosophy of History and Political Philosophy [哲学の根本問題補説第一——歴史哲学・政治哲学] (Chikuma Shobō [筑摩書房], September 1949), reprinted in CW11:133-282.

1950

- ‘Science, Philosophy and Religion’ [科学と哲学と宗教] (Chikuma Shobō Tetsugaku Kōza [筑摩書房 哲学講座], Vol. 4, March 1950), reprinted in CW12:132-207.
- The Fundamental Problems of Philosophy, Appendix 2: Philosophy of Science and Epistemology [哲学の根本問題補説第二——科学哲学・認識論] (Chikuma Shobō, April 1950), reprinted in CW11:283-425.

1951

- Valéry’s Aesthetics [ヴァレリイの芸術哲学] (Chikuma Shobō [筑摩書房], March 1951), reprinted in CW13:1-162.

1952

- Fundamental Problems of Philosophy, Appendix 3: Philosophy of Religion and Ethics [哲学の根本問題補説第三——宗教哲学・倫理学] (Chikuma Shobō [筑摩書房], April 1952), reprinted in CW11:427-632.

1953

- ‘Special Lecture at Kita-Karuizawa [北軽井沢特別講義] (May 1–3 and October 1–3, 1953), reprinted in CW15:287-417.
- ‘Philosophy, Poetry and Religion: Heidegger, Rilke, Hölderlin’ [哲学と詩と宗教——ハイデッガー・リルケ・ヘルダーリン] (begun in 1953, unfinished), reprinted in CW13:305-524.

1954

- A Historicist Further Development of Mathematics: A Memorandum on the Foundations of Mathematics [数理の歴史主義展開——数学基礎論覚書] (Chikuma Shobō [筑摩書房], November 1954), reprinted in CW12:209-334.

1955

- ‘Oskar Becker, Die Grundlagen der Mathematik in geschichtlicher Entwicklung’ [オスカー・ベッカー教授の『数学基礎発展史』] (Kagaku Kisoron Kenkyū [科学基礎論研究], Vol. 1, No. 3, March 1955), reprinted in CW14:250-252.
- Proposition of a New Methodology for Theoretical Physics: The Necessity of Theory of Functions of Complex Variables qua Method of Theoretical Physics and Its Topological Character [理論物理学新方法論提説——理論物理学の方法としての複素変数関数論の必然性とその位相学的性格] (Chikuma Shobō [筑摩書房], May 1955), reprinted in CW12:335-368.
- Dialectic of the Theory of Relativity [相対性理論の弁証法] (Chikuma Shobō [筑摩書房], October 1955), reprinted in CW12:369-402.

1958

- ‘Memento Mori’ [メメント・モリ] (Shinano Kyōiku [信濃教育], No. 858, May 1958), reprinted in CW13:163-175 and SPW4:11-29.

1960

- ‘My Interpretation of the Chan Preface’ [禅源私解] (in Festschrift for D. T. Suzuki [鈴木大拙博士記念論文集], Suzuki Gakujutsu Zaidan [鈴木学術財団], October 1960), reprinted in CW13:177-198 and SPW4:31-62.

1961

- A Memorandum on Mallarmé [マラルメ覚書] (Chikuma Shobō [筑摩書房], August 1961), reprinted in CW13:199-304 and SPW4:63-218.

1962

- ‘Ontology of Life or Dialectic of Death?’ [生の存在学か死の弁証法か] (Tetsugaku Kenkyū [哲学研究], No. 483, November 1962), reprinted in CW13:525-576 and SPW4:219-295.

=== English translations ===
Early works (1910–1919)

- "The Logic of the Species as Dialectics," trans. David Dilworth and Taira Sato, in Monumenta Nipponica, Vol. 24, No. 3 (1969): 273–288.
- "Kant's Theory of Freedom," trans. Takeshi Morisato with Cody Staton in "An Essay on Kant’s Theory of Freedom from the Early Works of Tanabe Hajime" in Comparative and Continental Philosophy, vol. 5 (2013): 150–156.
- "On the Universal," trans. Takeshi Morisato with Timothy Burns, in "Groundwork for the Metaphysics of Deductive Reasoning: The Relation of the Universal and the Particular in Early Works of Tanabe Hajime" in Comparative and Continental Philosophy, vol. 5 (2013): 124–149.

Middle Work (1920–1930)

- "Requesting the Guidance of Professor Nishida," trans., Richard Stone and Takeshi Morisato, Asian Philosophical Texts: Exploring Hidden Sources, eds., Roman Pasca and Takeshi Morisato, 281–308. Milan: Mimesis, 2020.

Logic of Species (1931–1945)

- "The Social Ontological Structure of the Logic," Tanabe Hajime and the Kyoto School: Self, World, and Knowledge. London: Bloomsbury, 2021.

Later works (1946–1962)

- Philosophy as Metanoetics, trans. Takeuchi Yoshinori, Valdo Viglielmo, and James W. Heisig, University of California Press, 1987.
- "Demonstration of Christianity", in Introduction to the Philosophy of Tanabe: According to the English Translation of the Seventh Chapter of the Demonstratio of Christianity, trans. Makoto Ozaki, Rodopi BV Editions, 1990.
