= Abuse of notation =

Informal use of mathematical notation

In mathematics, abuse of notation occurs when an author uses a mathematical notation in a way that is not entirely formally correct, but which might help to simplify the exposition or to suggest the correct intuition, while possibly minimizing errors and confusion at the same time.

A closely related concept is abuse of language or abuse of terminology, where a term — rather than a notation — is used informally. For example, while the word representation properly designates a group homomorphism from a group G to GL(V), where V is a vector space, it is common to call V itself a "representation of G."

Since both mathematical notation and terminology vary across time and context, what is flagged as abuse in one context could be formally correct in another. Furthermore, abuse of notation should not be conflated with misuse of notation, which does not have the presentational benefits of the former and should be avoided, such as the misuse of constants of integration.

== Examples ==
=== Suppression of parameters ===
Many mathematical objects consist of a set, often called the underlying set, equipped with some additional structure, such as a mathematical operation or a topology. It is a common abuse of notation to use the same symbol for the underlying set and the structured object, a phenomenon known as suppression of parameters.

For example, $\mathbb Z$ may denote the set of the integers, the group of integers together with addition, or the ring of integers with addition and multiplication. Likewise, $\mathbb R^3$ is often used to mean 3D Euclidean space taken as a vector space, metric space, or topological space, depending on the properties relevant in context. This is because, for example, the Euclidean distance is understood to be the 'default' metric on $\mathbb R^3$ and is assumed when not stated otherwise, even though there are others.

Similarly, while a topological space $(X, \mathcal{T})$ consists of both an underlying set $X$ and a topology $\mathcal{T}$, it is customary to talk about "the space $X$" in situations where only one topology on $X$ is ever considered — once that topology is clearly established.

In general, there is no problem with suppression of parameters if the object under reference is well understood, and avoiding such an abuse of notation might even make mathematical texts more pedantic and more difficult to read. When this abuse of notation may be confusing, one may distinguish between structures by denoting e.g. $(\mathbb Z, +)$ the group of integers with addition and $(\mathbb Z, +, \cdot)$ the ring of integers; by explicitly defining the topology, metric structure, etc. of interest on $\mathbb R^3$; or by explicitly writing out tuples like $(X, \mathcal{T})$ and $(X, \mathcal{T'})$ to distinguish between different topological spaces with the same underlying set.

=== Function notation ===
One may encounter, in many textbooks, sentences such as "Let $f(x)$ be a function ...". This is an abuse of notation, as the name of the function is $f,$ and $f(x)$ denotes the value of $f$ for the element $x$ of its domain. More precisely correct phrasings include "Let $f$ be a function of the variable $x$ ..." or "Let $x \mapsto f(x)$ be a function ..." This abuse of notation is widely used, as it simplifies the formulation, and the systematic use of a correct notation quickly becomes pedantic.

Another abuse of notation occurs in sentences such as "Let us consider the function $x^2 + x + 1$ ...", when in fact $x^2 + x + 1$ is a polynomial expression, not a function per se — whereas the function that maps the variable $x$ to $x^2 + x + 1$ could formally be denoted $x \mapsto x^2 + x + 1.$ Similarly, a constant function $f$ may be identified with its value, as in $f = c$, when it would be more correct to write e.g. "$f(x) = c$ for all inputs $x$." Nevertheless, these abuses of notation are widely used, since they are more concise and generally not confusing.

=== Equality vs. isomorphism ===
Many mathematical structures are defined through a characterizing property (often a universal property). Once this desired property is defined, there may be various ways to construct the structure, and the corresponding results are formally different objects, but which have exactly the same properties (i.e., isomorphic). As there is no way to distinguish these isomorphic objects through their properties, it is standard to consider them as equal, even if this is formally wrong.

One example of this is the Cartesian product, which is often seen as associative:
$$(E \times F) \times G = E \times (F \times G) = E \times F \times G$$

But this is strictly speaking not true: if $x \in E$, $y \in F$ and $z \in G$, the identity $((x, y), z) = (x, (y, z))$ would imply that $(x, y) = x$ and $z = (y, z)$, and so $((x, y), z) = (x, y, z)$ would mean nothing. However, these equalities can be legitimized and made rigorous in category theory—using the idea of a natural isomorphism.

Another example of similar abuses occurs in statements such as "there are two non-Abelian groups of order 8", which more strictly stated means "there are two isomorphism classes of non-Abelian groups of order 8".

=== Equivalence classes ===
Referring to an equivalence class of an equivalence relation by $x$ instead of $[x]$ is an abuse of notation. Formally, if a set $X$ is partitioned by an equivalence relation $\sim$, then for each $x \in X$, the equivalence class $\{y \in X | y \sim x\}$ is denoted $[x]$. But in practice, if the remainder of the discussion is focused on the equivalence classes rather than the individual elements of the underlying set, then it is common to drop the square brackets in the discussion.

For example, in modular arithmetic, a finite group of order $n$ can be formed by partitioning the integers via the equivalence relation "$x \sim y$ if and only if $x \equiv y \ (\mathrm{mod}\ n)$". The elements of that group would then be $[0], [1], \dots, [n - 1]$, but in practice they are usually denoted simply as $0, 1, ..., n-1$.

Another example is the space of (classes of) measurable functions over a measure space, or classes of Lebesgue integrable functions, where the equivalence relation is equality "almost everywhere".

== Subjectivity ==
The terms "abuse of language" and "abuse of notation" depend on context. Writing "f : A → B" for a partial function from A to B is almost always an abuse of notation, but not in a category theoretic context, where f can be seen as a morphism in the category of sets and partial functions.

== See also ==
- Mathematical notation
- Misnomer
