= Metanoetics =

Neologism in religious philosophy

Metanoetics (from Greek: μετανόησις "conversion, repentance" from μετανοῶ "I repent"; Japanese: 懺悔道 zangedō from dō 道 “path” and zange 懺悔 “confession, penance, repentance”) is a neologism coined by Hajime Tanabe in his 1945 work Philosophy as Metanoetics. The term denotes a way of doing philosophy (or a form of "non-philosophy") that understands the limits of reason. Though the method used by Tanabe to reach this conclusion relies on the transcendental analysis developed by Kant, Tanabe aligns the method with the Buddhist concept of Absolute Nothingness and ideas from of Pure Land Buddhism, Zen, and Christianity.

Tanabe states that Kant did not take the critique of reason far enough. By this Tanabe means that a radical critique of reason should question whether reason can account for itself. The individual exercising reason should remain aware of the crisis of reason and see the antinomy, those rationally unsolvable contradictions that reason unearths, as the basis for personal renewal. The crisis of reason is not just a disruption of thought; it also involves a crisis of will. As the individual understands the radical limits of reason in facing the antinomies, they become aware of what Kant called radical evil. This is the will to act according to desires beyond those presented by rational reflection. With this realization comes further crisis and thereby the possibility of metanoia.

In this state of crisis, the individual gains the perspective required to see another source of enlightenment. Tanabe uses the Pure Land Buddhist term of "other-power" to denote this source, also called Absolute Nothingness. This metanoia realizes the inadequacy of human efforts to discover the source of self-awareness and surrenders to it. This surrender provides the power to continue the search for meaning within the midst of everyday life and to act in a compassionate and charitable way to bring others to self-realization.

== Bibliography ==
- Tanabe, Hajime, Philosophy as Metanoetics (Nanzan Studies in Religion and Culture), Yoshinori Takeuchi, Valdo Viglielmo, and James W. Heisig (Translators), University of California Press (April 1987), ISBN 0-520-05490-3.
- Unno, Taitetsu and Heisig, James W. (editors), The Religious Philosophy of Tanabe Hajime: The Metanoetic Imperative (Nanzan Studies in Religion and Culture), Asian Humanities Press (June 1990), ISBN 0-89581-873-6, ISBN 978-0-89581-873-7.
- Wattles, Jeffrey, "Dialectic and Religious Experience in Tanabe Hajime's Philosophy as Metanoetics".
- Philosophy and Spiritual Experience: The Case of a Japanese Shin Buddhist.
