= Gjorgi Kolozov =

Macedonian actor (1948–2003)

Gjorgji Kolozov
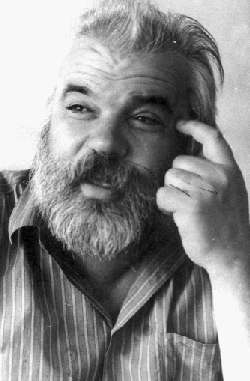
- Born: February 26, 1948; Bogdanci, Yugoslavia
- Died: October 13, 2003 (aged 55); Skopje, Republic of Macedonia
- Education: Ss. Cyril and Methodius University of Skopje
- Occupation: Actor
- Spouse: Shenka Kolozova

Gjorgi Kolozov (Macedonian: Ѓорѓи Колозов; February 26, 1948 – October 13, 2003) was one of the best-known Macedonian actors. He became famous by playing one of the main roles in the television series Makedonski narodni prikazni (Macedonian Folk Tales), which aired in the late 1980s and 1990s.

Kolozov is remembered as a white‑haired man with a white beard who almost resembled Santa Claus in appearance and facial description. He appeared in a variety of roles but mostly in that of a tsar, a peasant or God. Having won the hearts of the widest audience and earned the title "the Macedonian tsar" among the Macedonian actors. His fame has not faded away and the number of his fans continues to grow.

== Early life ==
Kolozov was born to a poor family in the small town of Bogdanci and started his career in the theater of Štip. He was a member of the first graduating class at the Academy of Drama Arts, Ss. Cyril and Methodius University of Skopje in 1973.

== Career ==
After his graduation, Kolozov became permanently employed in the Macedonian National Theater.

For decades, he appeared in leading roles in the popular television series Makedonski narodni prikazni, produced by Macedonian Radio-Television The 300 episodes of Makedonski narodni prikazni are based on the collections of oral literature stories published in the 19th century by Marko Cepenkov, Kuzman Sapkarev, Georgi Pulevski and other significant authors of collections of the Macedonian oral literary heritage. The televised folk stories were aired for almost 15 years with unchanged ratings. Kolozov and his wife Shenka Kolozova appeared as actors and assisted with story selection and screenplays.

Kolozov gained his high popularity achieving the status of not only a celebrity but also a national icon symbolizing the Macedonian cultural identity, thanks to his style of acting perceived as incarnating the simplicity and naiveté of both the literary genre of the folk stories and the ordinary Macedonian man.

Kolozov appeared in a number of Macedonian (ex-Yugoslav) films, such as

- Tetoviranje (1991) (eng.Tattoo)
- Istrel (1972) (eng.Gunshot)
- Makedonskiot del od Pekolot (1971) (eng. The Macedonian part of Hell)

as well as in a great number of television films produced by Macedonian Television (RTS as part of the ex-Yugoslav TV network). Kolozov also appeared in hundreds of theater plays in the Macedonian National Theater, and in other theaters in Macedonia and Bulgaria. He established a small, private theater company, which produces independent plays around the country.

== Personal life ==
Kolozov married actress and screenplay writer Shenka Kolozova in 1969. They had two daughters: Katerina (Katarina) (born October 20, 1969) and Kristina (born October 15, 1972). Kolozov was tracked by the UDBA, whose informant accused him of being a Bulgarophile, a stigma in Communist Yugoslavia.
