= Logical intuition =

Ability to readily identify logical or mathematical truth

Logical Intuition, or mathematical intuition or rational intuition, is a series of instinctive foresight, know-how, and savviness often associated with the ability to perceive logical or mathematical truth—and the ability to solve mathematical challenges efficiently. Humans apply logical intuition in proving mathematical theorems, validating logical arguments, developing algorithms and heuristics, and in related contexts where mathematical challenges are involved. The ability to recognize logical or mathematical truth and identify viable methods may vary from person to person, and may even be a result of knowledge and experience, which are subject to cultivation. The ability may not be realizable in a computer program by means other than genetic programming or evolutionary programming.

== History ==
Plato and Aristotle considered intuition a means for perceiving ideas, significant enough that for Aristotle, intuition comprised the only means of knowing principles that are not subject to argument.

Henri Poincaré distinguished logical intuition from other forms of intuition. In his book The Value of Science, he points out that:

...[T]here are many kinds of intuition. I have said how much the intuition of pure number, whence comes rigorous mathematical induction, differs from sensible intuition to which the imagination, properly so called, is the principal contributor.

The passage goes on to assign two roles to logical intuition: to permit one to choose which route to follow in search of scientific truth, and to allow one to comprehend logical developments.

Bertrand Russell, though critical of intuitive mysticism, pointed out that the degree to which a truth is self-evident according to logical intuition can vary, from one situation to another, and stated that some self-evident truths are practically infallible:

When a certain number of logical principles have been admitted, the rest can be deduced from them; but the propositions deduced are often just as self-evident as those that were assumed without proof. All arithmetic, moreover, can be deduced from the general principles of logic, yet the simple propositions of arithmetic, such as 'two and two are four', are just as self-evident as the principles of logic.

Kurt Gödel demonstrated based on his incompleteness theorems that intuition-based propositional calculus cannot be finitely valued. Gödel also likened logical intuition to sense perception, and considered the mathematical constructs that humans perceive to have an independent existence of their own. Under this line of reasoning, the human mind's ability to sense such abstract constructs may not be finitely implementable.

== Discussion ==
Dissent regarding the value of intuition in a logical or mathematical context may often hinge on the breadth of the definition of intuition and the psychological underpinning of the word. Dissent regarding the implications of logical intuition in the fields of artificial intelligence and cognitive computing may similarly hinge on definitions. However, similarity between the potentially infinite nature of logical intuition posited by Gödel and the hard problem of consciousness posited by David Chalmers suggest that the realms of intuitive knowledge and experiential consciousness may both have aspects that are not reducible to classical physics concepts.

== See also ==
- Intuition
- Epistemology
- Philosophy of mind
- Philosophy of mathematics
- Cognition
- Numerical cognition
- Consciousness
- Hard problem of consciousness
- Panpsychism
- Transcendental idealism
- Intuitionism
- Intuitionistic logic
- Continuum hypothesis
- Logical truth
