= Gilles Grelet =

French theorist

Gilles Grelet (French: [gʁəlɛ]) (1971-) is a French theorist. Following years of teaching, he now lives permanently at sea aboard his boat Théorème.

== Work ==
Grelet's theory of rebellion draws most conspicuously on the work of Guy Lardreau and Christian Jambet, whose 1976 jointly authored book L'Ange marries Lacanian psychoanalysis and Maoism.

Aside from his published writings, Grelet has collaborated with French underground filmmakers Dojo Cinéma.

He co-founded with François Laruelle and Ray Brassier a book collection, Nous, les sans philosophie, published by L'Harmattan, comprising key works by exponents of Laruelle's non-standard matrix of theory (Jacques Fradin, Hugues Choplin, Patrick Fontaine, Patrice Guillamaud...).

Laruellean scholar Ekin Erkan details the Marxist/political praxis of an amalgam of François Laruelle's students, noting that "[i]t is mirthless to seek a revolutionary ethos in Laruelle – his critique solely provides us with the appropriate tools and [ . . . ] the ethics with which to problematize philosophy. Laruelle’s contemporaries, such as his anarcho-Maoist student, Gilles Grelet, have weaponized Laruelle to radicalize non-philosophy and pose an antiphenomenological practice."

== Bibliography ==
=== Original books ===
- Théorie du navigateur solitaire (Paris: Hkp, 2026). English edition: Theory of the Solitary Sailor (Falmouth: Urbanomic, 2022). Italian edition: Teoria del navigatore solitario (Rome: Luiss University Press, 2024). Russian edition: Теория одиночного мореплавателя (Moscow: Ad Marginem & HylePress, 2025).
- Déclarer la gnose. D'une guerre qui revient à la culture (Paris: L'Harmattan, 2002).

=== Co-authored books ===
- Citations pour le Président Sarkozy, with illustrations by Juan Pérez Agirregoikoa (Montreuil: Éditions Matière, 2009).
- Le théorisme, méthode de salut public/Faible passion du réel, with illustrations by Juan Pérez Agirregoikoa (Montreuil: Éditions Matière, 2006).
- Discipline hérétique, with François Laruelle, Danilo de Almeida and Tony Brachet (Paris: Kimé, 1998).

=== Edited book ===
- Théorie-rébellion. Un ultimatum (Paris: L'Harmattan, 2005). (Includes contributions from Jason Barker, Ray Brassier, Oliver Feltham and François Laruelle). Brazilian edition: Teoria Rebelião - Um Ultimato (Rio de Janeiro: NOVAmente editora, 2011).

=== Selected articles ===
- "Anti-phénoménologie", Revue philosophique de la France et de l'étranger, 2004–2, tome 129, p. 211-224. "Anti-Phenomenology", English translation by Kris Pender.
