= Katerina Kolozova =

Macedonian academic, author and philosopher

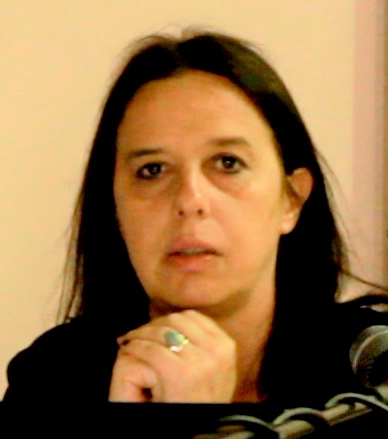
- Kolozova in 2017
- Born: October 20, 1969 (age 56); Skopje, SR Macedonia, SFR Yugoslavia
- Other name: Katarina Kolozova

Education
- Education: University of Skopje

Philosophical work
- Era: Contemporary
- Region: Western philosophy
- School: Continental philosophy Speculative realism Non-philosophy
- Institutions: Co-director of the School of Materialist Research
- Main interests: Metaphysics, political philosophy
- Notable ideas: Criticism of post-structural feminism

Katerina "Katarina" Kolozova (/koʊˈlɒzoʊvə/; Macedonian: Катерина (Катарина) Колозова [kɔˈlɔzɔva]; born on October 20, 1969) is a Macedonian academic, author and philosopher.

She is the co-director and faculty at the School of Materialist Research, an international interuniversity platform founded by Arizona State University - Center for Philosophical Technologies, TU Wien, Eindhoven Academy of Design and Institute of Social Sciences and Humanities-Skopje. She is also the director and professor of gender studies and philosophy at the Institute of Social Sciences and Humanities, Skopje and an affiliated professor at ATTP of the Technical University Vienna. She has been associated with speculative realism and has written about the non-philosophy of François Laruelle and the works of Karl Marx. She has been a member of the Organisation Non-Philosophique Internationale (International Organization of Non-Philosophy), with headquarters in Paris, France, since it was founded. She is a board member of The New Centre for Research & Practice of Grand Rapids, Michigan.

== Biography ==
Kolozova defended her PhD The Hellenes and Death in April 1998. Her doctoral research entailed co-supervised work abroad with Jean-Pierre Vernant in Paris (EHESS: Centre Louis Gernet) for which she earned a scholarship from the French Ministry of foreign affairs, ISH Ljubljana co-supervised by Svetlana Slapasak. The international dimension of her PhD research entailed a year-long fellowship at the Gender Studies Department at the Central European University (CEU) in Budapest (now in Vienna), in the form of "Doctoral Support Program" for which she earned a full scholarship and a stipend from CEU. In 2009, Kolozova was a visiting scholar (post-doc with a Fulbright scholarship) at UC Berkeley working under the peer supervision of Judith Butler.

Her teaching career started at her alma mater Ss. Cyril and Methodius University of Skopje as a graduate-level assistant professor in gender and communications studies–first appointment in the academic year of 1999–2000.

Since 2021, Kolozova has been appointed Visiting Faculty at the Center for Philosophical Technologies at Arizona State University. She was a visiting scholar at the Department of Rhetoric at the University of California-Berkeley. Kolozova was a visiting professor at the University of Sarajevo and the University of Sofia. She is a visiting professor at the Political Studies Department of the Faculty of Media and Communications Singidunum University in Belgrade.

In February 2022 (updated in February 2023), Kolozova was ranked #14 of the 25 most influential women in philosophy according to Academic Influence in the past 10 years.

=== Stance on the Macedonian–Bulgarian dispute ===
Kolozova is one of the public figures who strive to improve the relations between Bulgaria and North Macedonia. She is a member of the Friendship Club between the two countries. Kolozova maintains North Macedonia lacks political will to improve the relationships between the two states, but the Bulgarian side attaches too much importance to issue of the common history as a condition for improving the relations. Her understandings on that issue, are not well received in North Macedonia.

=== Stance on third wave feminism ===
Her monograph Cut of the Real: Subjectivity in Poststructuralist Philosophy published with Columbia University Press, 2014 (2nd edition 2018) is a provocation to the poststructuralist paradigm in feminist philosophy, seeking to vindicate the relevance of the notions of the "One" (versus subjectivity understood as flux of multiplicity of subject and identity positions), the Real (versus discursive construct treated as fiction), arguing for repositioning of third wave feminism, or at least aspects of it, in a new form of realism, often associated with speculative realism. The book has had some notable traction, which amounted to the invitation to Kolozova to author the chapter on Poststructuralism in the first in over 20 years Oxford Handbook of Feminist Philosophy (published in 2021).

== Selected works ==
Books

- The Death and the Greeks. On the Philosophical and Traditional Concepts of Death in Ancient Greece, Skopje: Kultura, 2000.
- The Real and 'I': On the Limit and the Self, Skopje: EuroBalkan Press ("Identities Series of Books"), 2006. ISBN 9989136483 (in English)
- The Cut of the Real: Subjectivity in Poststructuralist Philosophy, New York: Columbia University Press, 2014, ISBN 9780231536431
- Toward a Radical Metaphysics of Socialism: Marx and Laruelle, Brooklyn, New York: Punctum Books, 2016, ISBN 9780692492413
- The Lived Revolution: Solidarity with the Body in Pain as the New Political Universal. Skopje: Institute of Social Sciences and Humanities-Skopje, 2016 (in English) ISBN 9786084755104
- Translation from Ancient Greek of Euripides' Medea, with an Introductory Study and Commentaries. Skopje: Ad Verbum, 2016. (in Macedonian) ISBN 9786084627401
- Capitalism’s Holocaust of Animals: A Non-Marxist Critique of Capital, Philosophy and Patriarchy. London UK: Bloomsbury Academic, 2019, ISBN 9781350109681
- Co-authored with Paul Cockshott and Greg Michaelson, "Defending Materialism: The Uneasy History of the Atom in Science and Philosophy," signed with Bloomsbury Academic (London UK)

As editor

- (editor) Classic Readings in Gender Theory, Skopje: EuroBalkan Press, 2003.
- (co-editor with Svetlana Slapšak and Jelisaveta Blagojevic) Gender and Identity: Theories from/on Southeastern Europe Belgrade/Utrecht: Advanced Thematic Network for Women’s Studies in Europe-ATHENA, 2006. (in English) ISBN 868651300X
- (co-editor and contributor) Conversations with Judith Butler: Crisis of the Unitary Subject Skopje: "Euro-Balkan" Press, 2007. (in Macedonian and in English) ISBN 9989136505
- (co-editor with Eileen Joy) After the Speculative Turn: Realism, Philosophy and Feminism, Brooklyn, New York: Punctum Books, 2016. ISBN 9780998237534.
- (co-editor with Niccolò Milanese) “Illiberal Democracies” in Europe: An Authoritarian Response to the Crisis of Illiberalism Washington D.C: Illiberalism Studies Program, The Institute for European, Russian, and Eurasian Studies, The George Washington University, 2023 (in English) ISBN 9798986583136

== See also ==
- Gjorgji Kolozov, her father, an actor
