= Religion within the Bounds of Bare Reason =

1793 book by Immanuel Kant

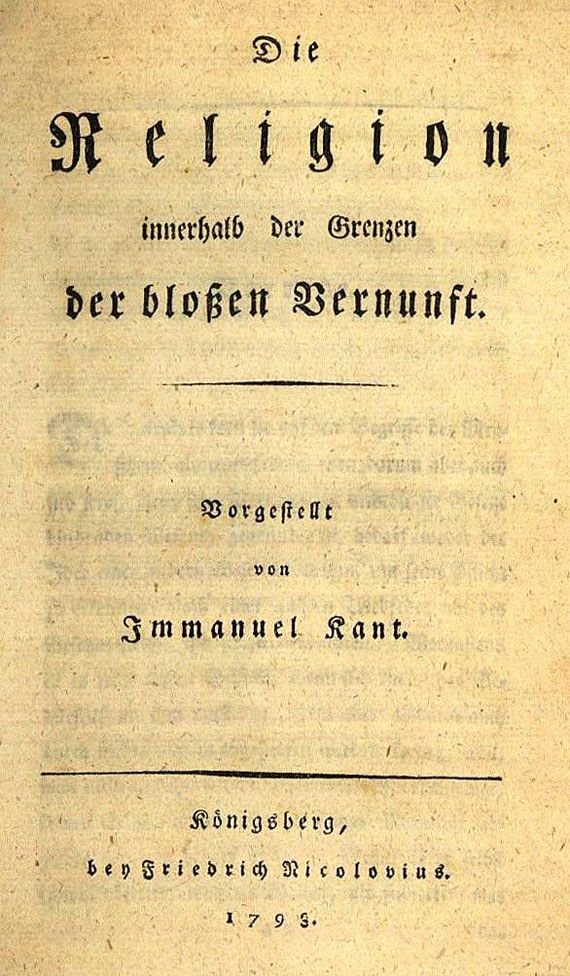
- Author: Immanuel Kant
- Original title: Die Religion innerhalb der Grenzen der bloßen Vernunft
- Language: German
- Subject: Philosophy of religion
- Published: 1793
- Publication place: Germany
- Media type: Print
- Pages: 296

Religion within the Bounds of Bare Reason (German: Die Religion innerhalb der Grenzen der bloßen Vernunft) is a 1793 book by the German philosopher Immanuel Kant. Although its purpose and original intent has become a matter of some dispute, the book's immense and lasting influence on the history of theology and the philosophy of religion is indisputable.

He strongly criticises ritual, superstition and a church hierarchy in this work. He also discusses issues and topics central to his religious and moral philosophy including the relationships between rationality, ethics, and religion.

== Structure of the work ==
The book consists of four parts, called "Pieces" (Stücke), which were published as a whole in 1793. It was initially planned as a series of four journal articles to be published separately at different times until censorship issues started with the second "piece". The general division of the book along with the subsections of each of the four parts is as follows:

Preface to the first edition (1793)
Preface to the second edition (1794)
Part I: Concerning the indwelling of the evil principle alongside the good, or, Of radical evil in human nature.

I. Concerning the Original Predisposition to Good in Human Nature
II. Concerning the Propensity to Evil in Human Nature
III. The Human Being is by Nature Evil
IV. Concerning the Origin of Evil in Human Nature

Part II: Concerning the struggle of the good with the evil principle for dominion over the human being.

Section one: Concerning the rightful claim of the good principle to dominion over the human being
Section two: Concerning the evil principle's rightful claim to dominion over the human being, and the struggle of the two principles with one another

Part III: Concerning the victory of the good over the evil principle and the founding of a Kingdom of God on Earth.

Division one: Philosophical representation of the victory of the good principle in the founding of a Kingdom of God on earth
Division two: Historical representation of the gradual establishment of the dominion of the good principle on earth

Part IV: Concerning service and counterfeit service under the dominion of the good principle, or, of Religion and Priestcraft.

First part: Concerning the service of God in a religion in general
Second part: Concerning the counterfeit service of God in a statutory religion

== Royal censorship ==
In February of 1792, Kant sent to J. E. Biester, the editor of the Berlinische Monatsschrift, an essay entitled "Concerning Radical Evil in Human Nature" and asked J. E. Biester to send the essay to the Berlin office of censorship for approval. The essay was approved after examination by G. F. Hillmer, the philosophy censor, who thought it was intended only for scholars and stated that "after careful reading, I see that this book, like other Kantian works, is intended for and can be enjoyed only by thinkers, researchers and scholars capable of fine distinctions". This essay then appeared as a Berlinische Monatsschrift article in April 1792 and became the first of four parts of a series on religion intended to be published in that same journal. Kant's attempt to publish the second part titled "Concerning the struggle of the good with the evil principle for dominion over the human being" in the same journal was opposed by King Friedrich Wilhelm II's censor in June of 1792 since the essay seemed to be theological to the censor. J. E. Biester filed a direct appeal to the King's cabinet after he saw nothing reprehensible in the second part, but the appeal was unanimously rejected by the King's cabinet. Kant then arranged to have all four pieces published as a book, routing it through the philosophy department at the University of Jena to avoid the need for theological censorship. Kant was reprimanded for this action of insubordination. When he nevertheless published a second edition in 1794, the censor arranged for a royal order that required Kant never to publish or even speak publicly about religion. On October 1, 1794, Kant received a royal letter and order, signed by the philosophical censor for the King, objecting to Kant's writings on religion and ordering him to avoid writing on religious topics. Kant complied with this royal order until after the death of King Friedrick William II and Frederick William III's ascension to the throne. He then resumed writing on religion with the publication of The Conflict of the Faculties in 1798.

== Title meaning and translations ==
The book's title is based on a metaphor Kant introduces in the Prefaces and uses throughout the book, whereby rational religion is depicted as a naked ("bare") body while historical religions are regarded as "clothing" that are not appropriate "vehicles" for conveying religious truths to the populace. The earliest translation treats this metaphor literally: using "naked" ignores the fact that Kant's "bloßen" can also mean "mere". The most recent translation solves this problem by using the English "bare", which also has both meanings.

== English translations ==
- Religion Within the Boundary of Pure Reason Semple translation 1838
- Stephen R. Palmquist, Comprehensive Commentary on Kant's Religion Within the Bounds of Bare Reason. John Wiley & Sons, 2016. A revision of Pluhar's translation, with a detailed commentary on the text, including on Kant's own changes between his first and second editions of Religion.
- Werner S. Pluhar, Religion within the Bounds of Bare Reason. Indianapolis: Hackett Publishing Company, 2009. Description & arrow-searchable table of Contents. With an Introduction by Stephen Palmquist.
- Allen W. Wood and George di Giovanni, Religion within the Boundaries of Mere Reason. Cambridge: Cambridge University Press, 1998. With an Introduction by Robert Merrihew Adams. Also included in Immanuel Kant: Religion and Rational Theology, volume 6 of The Cambridge Edition of the Works of Immanuel Kant, pp.55-215.
- Theodore M. Greene and Hoyt H. Hudson, Religion within the Limits of Reason Alone. New York: Harper and Brothers, 1934/1960.
- T.K. Abbott, translation of the First Piece only, on pp.323-360 of Immanuel Kant's Critique of Practical Reason and Other Works in Theory of Ethics. London: Longmans, Green & Co., Ltd, 1873.
- J.W. Semple, (title unknown). Edinburgh: Thomas Clark, 1838/1848.
- John Richardson, Religion within the Boundaries of Naked Reason extracts in J.S. Beck's The Principles of Critical Philosophy (1798). Revised and reprinted in Richardson's Essays and Treatises (London: William Richardson, 1799), volume 2, pp.367-422.
- Jonathan Bennett, "Religion within the Limits of Bare Reason", Early Modern Texts, 2017.

== See also ==
- Radical evil
