= François Laruelle =

French philosopher (1937–2024)

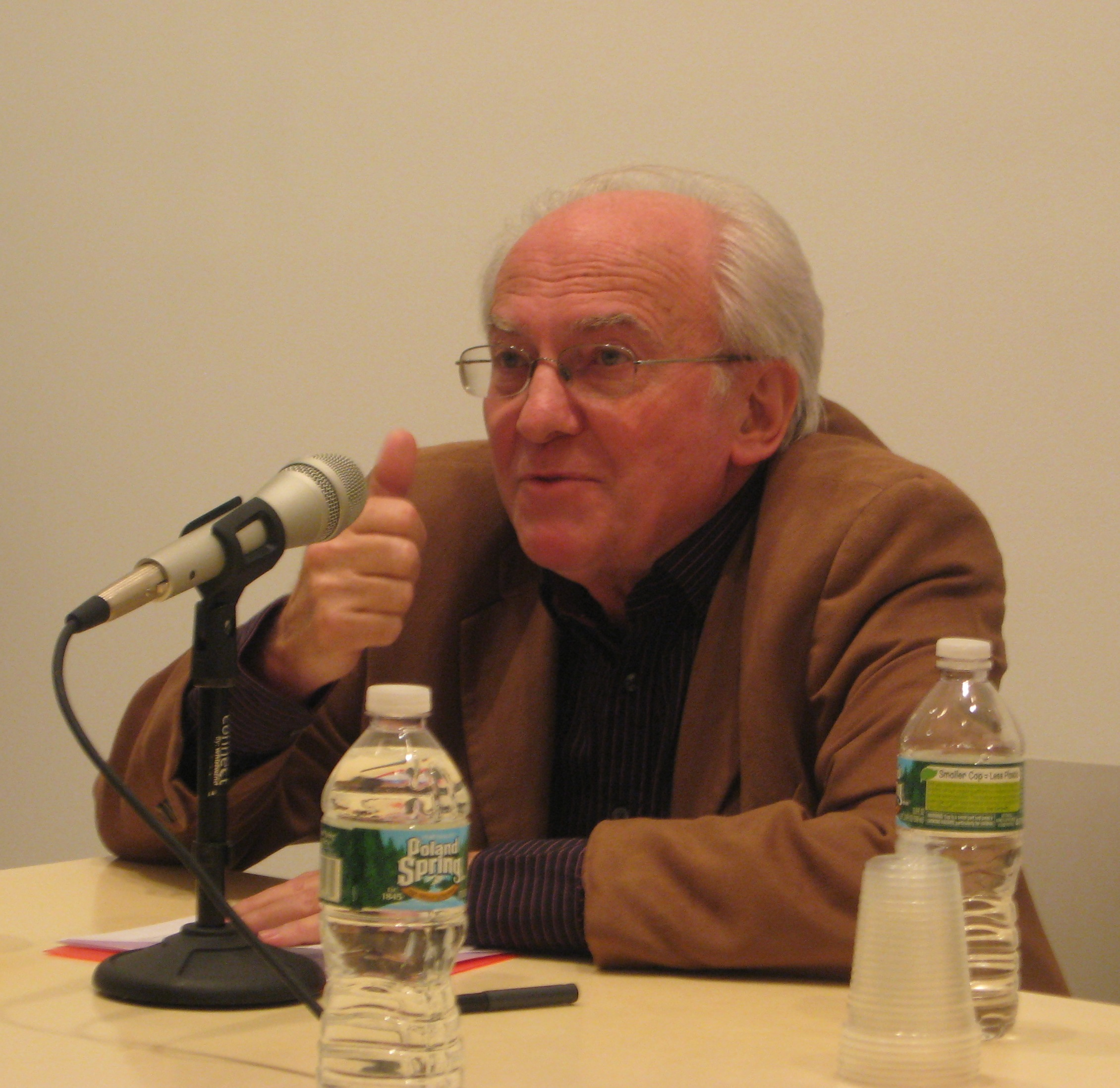
- Laruelle in 2011
- Born: 22 August 1937; Chavelot, France
- Died: 28 October 2024 (aged 87); Paris, France
- Partner: Anne-Françoise Schmid

Education
- Education: École Normale Supérieure; University of Paris X (PhD, 1975)
- Doctoral advisor: Paul Ricœur

Philosophical work
- Era: Contemporary philosophy
- Region: Western philosophy
- School: Continental philosophy Non-philosophy
- Institutions: University of Paris X
- Main interests: Ontology
- Notable ideas: Principle of Sufficient Philosophy, the philosophical decision, the Real, the One, vision-in-one, cloning the Real

François Laruelle (/lɑːrˈwɛl/; French: [fʁɑ̃swa laʁɥɛl]; 22 August 1937 – 28 October 2024) was a French philosopher, of the Collège international de philosophie and the University of Paris X: Nanterre. He began publishing in the early 1970s and had around twenty book-length titles to his name. An alumnus of the École normale supérieure, Laruelle was notable for developing a science of philosophy that he calls non-philosophy. Until his death, he directed an international organisation dedicated to furthering the cause of non-philosophy, the Organisation Non-Philosophique Internationale.

== Work ==
Laruelle divided his work into five periods: Philosophy I (1971–1981), Philosophy II (1981–1995), Philosophy III (1995–2002), Philosophy IV (2002–2008), and Philosophy V (2008–2024). The work comprising Philosophy I finds Laruelle attempting to subvert concepts found in Nietzsche, Heidegger, Deleuze and Derrida. Even at this early stage one can identify Laruelle's interest in adopting a transcendental stance towards philosophy. With Philosophy II, Laruelle makes a determined effort to develop a transcendental approach to philosophy itself. However, it is not until Philosophy III that Laruelle claims to have started the work of non-philosophy.

=== Non-philosophy ===
Laruelle claimed that all forms of philosophy (from ancient philosophy to analytic philosophy to deconstruction and so on) are structured around a prior decision, but that all forms of philosophy remain constitutively blind to this decision. The 'decision' that Laruelle was concerned with here was the dialectical splitting of the world in order to grasp the world philosophically. Laruelle claimed that the decisional structure of philosophy can only be grasped non-philosophically. In this sense, non-philosophy is a science of philosophy. Laruellean (non)ethics is "radically de-anthropocentrized, fundamentally directed towards a universalized, auto-effective set of generic conditions."

== Reception and influence ==
In 2003, he was described by Scottish philosopher Ray Brassier as "the most important unknown philosopher working in Europe today". Already in the 1990s, Gilles Deleuze and Félix Guattari had referred to him as [being] "engaged in one of the most interesting undertakings of contemporary philosophy." The first English-language reception of his work (Brassier's account of Laruelle in Radical Philosophy in 2003) has been followed with a slew of introductions from John Ó Maoilearca (Mullarkey), Anthony Paul Smith, Rocco Gangle, Katerina Kolozova, and Alexander R. Galloway, as well as Brassier's own subsequent book, Nihil Unbound.

Today, Laruelle's international reception is growing with dozens of titles a year translated and published in English by such publishing houses as Polity Books, Edinburgh University Press, Continuum, Palgrave Macmillan, Columbia University Press, Urbanomic/Sequence and others.

== Death ==
Laurelle died on 28 October 2024, at the age of 87.

== Bibliography ==
=== Books ===
==== Philosophy I ====
- Phénomène et différence. Éssai sur l'ontologie de Ravaisson [Phenomenon and Difference. An Essay on the Ontology of Ravaisson], Klinskieck, Paris, 1971.
  - Phenomenon and Difference: Essay on the Ontology of Ravaisson. trans. Lindsay Lerman, &&& Publishing, 2023
- Machines textuelles. Déconstruction et libido d'écriture [Textual Machines: Deconstruction and Libido of Writing], Seuil, Paris, 1976.
- Nietzsche contra Heidegger. Thèses pour une politique nietzschéenne [Nietzsche contra Heidegger: Theses for a Nietzschean Politics], Payot, Paris, 1977.
- Le Déclin de l’écriture, suivi d'entretiens avec J-L Nancy, S. Kofman, J. Derrida et P. Lacoue-Labarthe [The Decline of Writing. Followed by Interviews with Jean-Luc Nancy, Sarah Kofman, Jacques Derrida, and Philippe-Lacoue-Labarthe] Paris, Aubier-Flammarion, 1977.
- Au-delà du principe de pouvoir [Beyond the Power Principle], Paris, Payot, 1978.

==== Philosophy II ====
- Le principe de minorité [The Minority Principle], Aubier Montaigne, Paris, 1981.
- Une biographie de l'homme ordinaire. Des Autorités et des Minorités, Paris, PUF, 1985.
  - A Biography of the Ordinary Man: Of Authorities and Minorities, trans. Jessie Hock and Alex Dubilet, Medford, Polity Press, 2018
- Les Philosophies de la différence. Introduction critique, Paris, PUF, 1986.
  - Philosophies of Difference: A Critical Introduction to Non-Philosophy, trans. Rocco Gangle, New York, Continuum 2010.
- Philosophie et non-philosophie, Mardaga, Liège/Brussels, 1989.
  - Philosophy and Non-Philosophy, trans. Taylor Adkins, Minneapolis, Univocal, 2013
- En tant qu'un. La non-philosophie éxpliquée au philosophes [As One: Non-Philosophy Explained to Philosophers], Aubier, Paris, 1991.
- Théorie des identités. Fractalité généralisée et philosophie artificielle, Paris, PUF, 1992.
  - Theory of Identities: Generalized Fractality and Artificial Philosophy, trans. Alyosha Edlebi, New York, Columbia University Press, 2016.

==== Philosophy III ====
- Théorie des Étrangers. Science des hommes, démocratie, non-psychoanalyse [Theory of Strangers: Science of Men, Democracy, Non-Psychoanalysis], Kimé, Paris, 1995.
  - Theory of Strangers: Science of People, Democracy, Non-Psychoanalysis, trans. Jeremy R. Smith, Edinburgh University Press, 2026.
- Principes de la non-philosophie, PUF, Paris, 1996.
  - Principles of Non-Philosophy, trans. Nicola Rubczak and Anthony Paul Smith, New York, Bloomsbury 2013
- Dictionnaire de la non-philosophie, François Laruelle et Collaborateurs, Kimé, Paris, 1998.
  - Dictionary of Non-Philosophy, trans. Taylor Adkins, Minneapolis, Univocal, 2013.
- Éthique de l'Étranger. Du crime contre l'humanité [Ethics of the Stranger: Of The Crime Against Humanity], Kimé, Paris, 2000.
- Introduction au non-marxisme, PUF, Paris, 2000.
  - Introduction to Non-Marxism, trans. Anthony Paul Smith, Univocal Publishing, 2015.

==== Philosophy IV ====
- Le Christ futur, une leçon d'hérésie, Exils, Paris 2002.
  - Future Christ: A Lesson in Heresy, trans. Anthony Paul Smith, New York, Continuum 2010.
- L'ultime honneur des intellectuels, Textuel, Paris 2003.
  - Intellectuals and Power, trans. Anthony Paul Smith, Malden, MA, Continuum, 2014.
- La Lutte et l'Utopie à la fin des temps philosophiques, Kimé, Paris 2004.
  - Struggle and Utopia at the End Times of Philosophy, trans. Drew S. Burk and Anthony Paul Smith, Univocal 2012.
- Mystique non-philosophique à l’usage des contemporains [Non-Philosophical Mysticism for Contemporary Use], L'Harmat, Paris 2007.

==== Philosophy V ====
- Introduction aux sciences génériques [Introduction to Generic Science], Pétra, Paris 2008.
- Philosophie non-standard: générique, quantique, philo-fiction [Non-Standard Philosophy: Generic, Quantum, Philo-Fiction], Paris, Kimé, 2010.
- Anti-Badiou: sur l'introduction du maoïsme dans la philosophie, Paris, Kimé, 2011.
  - Anti-Badiou: The Introduction of Maoism in Philosophy, trans. Robin Mackay, New York, Bloomsbury, 2013.
- Théorie générale des victimes, Paris, Mille et une nuits, 2012.
  - General Theory of Victims, trans. Jessie Hock and Alex Dubilet, Malden, MA, Polity, 2015.
- Christo-fiction: Les ruines d'Athènes et de Jérusalem, Paris, Fayard, 2014
  - Christo-Fiction: The Ruins of Athens and Jerusalem, trans. Robin Mackay, New York: Columbia University Press, 2015.
- En dernière humanité: la nouvelle science écologique, Paris, Cerf, 2015.
  - The Last Humanity: The New Ecological Science, trans. Anthony Paul Smith, New York, Bloomsbury, 2020.
- Tetralogos. Un opéra de philosophies [Tetralogos. An Opera of Philosophies], Paris, Editions du Cerf, 2019.
- Théologie clandestine pour les sans-religion: une confession de foi du non-philosophe, Paris, Kimé, 2019.
  - Clandestine Theology: A Non-Philosopher's Confession of Faith, trans. Andrew Sackin-poll, Cambridge, Bloomsbury, 2020.
- Le nouvel esprit technologique [The new technological spirit], Paris, Les Belles Lettres, 2020.

=== Selected articles translated into English ===
- François Laruelle, 'A Summary of Non-Philosophy' in Pli: The Warwick Journal of Philosophy. Vol. 8. Philosophies of Nature, 1999.
- François Laruelle, 'Identity and Event' in Pli: The Warwick Journal of Philosophy. Vol. 9. Parallel Processes, 2000.
- François Laruelle, 'The Decline of Materialism in the Name of Matter' in Pli: The Warwick Journal of Philosophy. Vol. 12. What Is Materialism? 2001.
- François Laruelle, 'The Truth According to Hermes: Theorems on the Secret and Communication' in Parrhesia 9 (2010): 18–22.
- François Laruelle, 'The End Times of Philosophy ' in continent. 2.3 (2012): 160–166.

== See also ==
- Marlène Laruelle, his daughter
- Speculative realism
