= Radical evil =

Phrase used by Immanuel Kant

Radical evil (German: das radikal Böse) is a phrase used by German philosopher Immanuel Kant, one representing the Christian term, radix malorum (the root of evil). Kant believed that human beings naturally have a tendency to be evil. He explains radical evil as corruption that entirely takes over a human being and leads to desires acting against the universal moral law. The outcome of one's natural tendency, or innate propensity, towards evil are actions or "deeds" that subordinate the moral law. According to Kant, these actions oppose universally moral maxims and display self-love and self conceit. Many authors see Kant's concept of radical evil as a paradox and inconsistent throughout his development of moral theories.

== Origin ==
The concept of radical evil was constructed by Immanuel Kant and first explained thoroughly in Kant's Religion within the Bounds of Reason Alone in 1793.

There Kant writes:

The depravity of human nature, then, is not so much to be called badness, if this word is taken in its strict sense, namely, as a disposition (subjective principle of maxims) to adopt the bad, as bad, into one's maxims as a spring (for that is devilish); but rather perversity of heart, which, on account of the result, is also called a bad heart. This may co-exist with a Will ["Wille"] good in general, and arises from the frailty of human nature, which is not strong enough to follow its adopted principles, combined with its impurity in not distinguishing the springs (even of well-intentioned actions) from one another by moral rule. So that ultimately it looks at best only to the conformity of its actions with the law, not to their derivation from it, that is, to the law itself as the only spring. Now although this does not always give rise to wrong actions and a propensity thereto, that is, to vice, yet the habit of regarding the absence of vice as a conformity of the mind to the law of duty (as virtue) must itself be designated a radical perversity of the human heart (since in this case the spring in the maxims is not regarded at all, but only the obedience to the letter of the law).

This concept has been described as a Kantian adaptation of the Lutheran phrase "simul justus et peccator."

== Categorical imperatives ==
Categorical imperatives (Cl) is the foundation of morality in which Kant uses to create the phrase radical evil. Kant characterized morality in terms of categorical imperatives. Cl is described as boundaries or laws that you should not pass regardless of our natural desires, that apply to all rational beings. We are expressed to have obligations in following these principles because they derive from reason. When one acts against Cl then one is seen to act irrationally and therefore immorally.

== Propensity of evil vs. the natural predisposition of good ==
To be morally evil is to possess desires that causes one to act against good. To be radically evil, one can no longer act in accordance to good because they determinedly follow maxims of willing that discounts good. According to Kant, a person has the choice between good maxims, rules that respect the moral law, and evil maxims, rules that contradict or opposes moral law. One that disregards, and act against moral law, they are described to be corrupted with an innate propensity to evil. Propensity is explained as a natural characteristic of a human being that is deemed non-necessary. Propensity therefore is distinguished as a tendency, or inclination, in one's behavior to act accordingly or opposed to the moral law. This propensity to evil is the source of one's immoral actions and therefore entirely corrupting one's natural predisposition of good. Since this has corrupted them as a whole, the evil is considered to be radical. This is not saying that being radical is a concrete mindset, the propensity of evil can be revised through what is described to be a "revolution of thought" which reforms one's character through moral agents that practice universal ethics.

== Incentives in humanity ==
Kant states that human willing is either good or evil, it is either one or neither. Human willing is considered good if one's action respects the moral law. There are three incentives in humanity in which we align our willing with, (1) animality, (2) humanity, and (3) personality.

Kant's concept of human freedom is characterized by three predisposition of the human will:

1. Enlists the existential drive for "self-preservation", one's sexual drive for breeding, the being preservation towards their child that is birthed through this breeding, and finally their "social drive" with other humans.
2. The propensity "to gain worth in the opinion of others." Through this predisposition, "jealousy and rivalry" is produced through beings hence incentives culture.
3. One's likeliness to follow the moral law.

== Inconsistency in ideas ==
Kant's inconsistency of his moral theories are pointed and argued by many authors. Kant changes his supporting arguments and claims in his work that some philosophers found as "scandalous", "inconsistent", and "indecisive". From this, Kant's idea of radical evil is seen as deviant and an undeveloped concept that does not support his overall ideas of ethics. Even though his development is seen as inconsistent, it is argued that his concept of radical evil aligns with his ideas of human freedom, the moral law, and moral responsibility.

== See also ==
- Misanthropy
- Xunzi (philosopher)
