= The Value of Science =

Work by Henri Poincaré

La Valeur de la Science
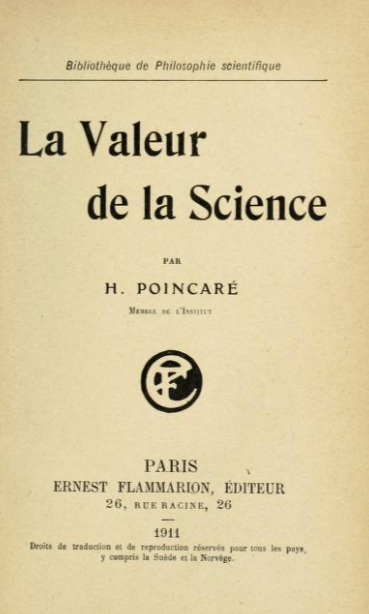
- Title page La Valeur de la Science (1911)
- Author: Henri Poincaré
- Original title: La Valeur de la Science
- Language: French
- Publication date: 1904
- Preceded by: Science and Hypothesis

The Value of Science (French: La Valeur de la Science) is a book by the French mathematician, physicist, and philosopher Henri Poincaré. It was published in 1904. The book deals with questions in the philosophy of science and adds detail to the topics addressed by Poincaré's previous book, Science and Hypothesis (1902).

== Intuition and logic ==
The first part of the book deals exclusively with the mathematical sciences, and particularly, the relationship between intuition and logic in mathematics. It first examines which parts of science correspond to each of these two categories of scientific thought, and outlines a few principles:

- What we define as intuition changes with the course of time (Classical philosophers were seen as logicians in their time, but today we might think of them as using intuition) – it is therefore the ideas that change, in the evolution of scientific thought;
- This evolution began with the arithmetization of analysis, and ended with the revival of intuitive ideas in an axiomatic system, by the first (true) logicians.

This historic intuition is therefore mathematical intuition. For Poincaré, it is a result of the principle of least effort, that is, of a link to scientific convention based on experimentation. Convention, thus given a context, permits one to consider different theories of the same problem, and subsequently make a choice based on the degree of simplicity and usefulness of explanations advanced by each of these theories (see also Occam's razor). The example chosen by Poincaré is that of three-dimensional space. He shows how the representation of this space is only one possibility, chosen for its usefulness among many models that the mind could create. His demonstration rests on the theory of The Mathematical Continuum (1893), one of Poincaré's earlier publications.

Finally, Poincaré advances the idea of a fundamental relationship between the sciences of geometry and analysis. According to him, intuition has two major roles: to permit one to choose which route to follow in search of scientific truth, and to allow one to comprehend logical developments:

Logic, which can only give certainties, is the instrument of demonstration; intuition is that of invention

Moreover, this relation seems to him inseparable from scientific advancement, which he presents as an enlargement of the framework of science – new theories incorporating previous ones, even while breaking old patterns of thought.

== Mathematical physics ==
In the second part of his book, Poincaré studies the links between physics and mathematics. His approach, at once historical and technical, illustrates the preceding general ideas.

Even though he was rarely an experimenter, Poincaré recognizes and defends the importance of experimentation, which must remain a pillar of the scientific method. According to him, it is not necessary that mathematics incorporate physics into itself, but must develop as an asset unto itself. This asset would be above all a tool: in the words of Poincaré, mathematics is "the only language in which [physicists] could speak" to understand each other and to make themselves heard. This language of numbers seems elsewhere to reveal a unity hidden in the natural world, when there may well be only one part of mathematics that applies to theoretical physics. The primary objective of mathematical physics is not invention or discovery, but reformulation. It is an activity of synthesis, which permits one to assure the coherence of theories current at a given time. Poincaré recognized that it is impossible to systematize all of physics of a specific time period into one axiomatic theory. His ideas of a three dimensional space are given significance in this context.

Poincaré states that mathematics (analysis) and physics are in the same spirit, that the two disciplines share a common aesthetic goal and that both can liberate humanity from its simple state. In a more pragmatic way, the interdependence of physics and mathematics is similar to his proposed relationship between intuition and analysis. The language of mathematics not only permits one to express scientific advancements, but also to take a step back to comprehend the broader world of nature. Mathematics demonstrates the extent of the specific and limited discoveries made by physicists. On the other hand, physics has a key role for the mathematician - a creative role since it presents atypical problems ingrained in reality. In addition, physics offers solutions and reasoning - thus the development of infinitesimal calculus by Isaac Newton within the framework of Newtonian mechanics.

Mathematical physics finds its scientific origins in the study of celestial mechanics. Initially, it was a consolidation of several fields of physics that dominated the 18th century and which had allowed advancements in both the theoretical and experimental fields. However, in conjunction with the development of thermodynamics (at the time disputed), physicists began developing an energy-based physics. In both its mathematics and its fundamental ideas, this new physics seemed to contradict the Newtonian concept of particle interactions. Poincaré terms this the first crisis of mathematical physics.

=== Second crisis ===
Throughout the 19th century, important discoveries were being made in laboratories and elsewhere. Many of these discoveries gave substance to important theories. Other discoveries could not be explained satisfactorily - either they had only been occasionally observed, or they were inconsistent with the new and emerging theories.

At the beginning of the 20th century, the unifying principles were thrown into question. Poincaré explains some of the most important principles and their difficulties:

- The principle of conservation of energy (which he called Mayer's principle) - the discovery of radium and radioactivity posed the problem of the continuous (and seemingly inexhaustible) energy emission of radioactive substances.
- The principle of entropy (which he called Carnot's principle) - Brownian motion seemed to be in opposition to the second law of thermodynamics.
- Newton's third law (which he called Newton's principle) — This law seemed to conflict with the laws of electrodynamics proposed by Maxwell, and with the ether theory he had proposed to explain them.
- The principle of conservation of mass (which he called Lavoisier's principle) — the consideration of movements at a speed close to that of light posed a problem for this principle; this is again an electrodynamic problem : the mass of a body in such a state of motion is not constant.
- the principle of relativity .
- Finally, he added the principle of least action.

At the beginning of the twentieth century, the majority of scientists spoke of Poincaré's "diagnosis" concerning the crisis of the physical principles. In fact, it was difficult to do otherwise: they had discovered experimental facts which the principles could not account for, and which they evidently could not ignore. Poincaré himself remained relatively optimistic regarding the evolution of physics with respect to these severe experimental difficulties. He had little confidence in the nature of principles: they were constructed by physicists because they accommodate and take into account a large number of laws. Their objective value consists in forming a scientific convention, in other words in providing a firm foundation to the basis on which truth and falsehood (in the scientific meaning of the words) are separated.

But if these principles are conventions, they are not therefore totally dissociated from experimental fact. On the contrary, if the principles can no longer sustain laws adequately, in accordance with experimental observation, they lose their utility and are rejected, without even having been contradicted. The failure of the laws entails the failure of the principles, because they must account for the results of experiment. To abolish these principles, products of the scientific thought of several centuries, without finding a new explanation that encompasses them (in the same manner that the "Physics of principles" encompasses the "Physics of central forces"), is to claim that all of past physics has no intellectual value. Consequently, Poincaré had great confidence that the principles were salvageable. He said that it was the responsibility of mathematical physics to reconstitute those principles, or to find a replacement for them (the greater goal being to return the field to unity), given that it had played the main role in questioning them only after consolidating them to begin with. Moreover, it was the value of mathematical physics (in terms of the scientific method) which itself saw criticism, due to the implosion of certain theories. Two physics thus existed at the same time: the physics of Galileo and Newton, and the physics of Maxwell; but neither one was able to explain all the experimental observations that technical advances had produced.

=== Electrodynamics of moving bodies ===
The array of problems encountered concentrated on the electrodynamics of moving bodies. Poincaré swiftly proposed the idea that it is the ether modifying itself, and not the bodies acquiring mass, which came to contradict the older theories (based on a perfectly immovable ether). Overall, Poincaré shed light on the Zeeman effect, caused by discontinuous emissions of electrons. The problem of discontinuous matter forced the formulation of a minimally-destabilizing model of the atom. In 1913, Niels Bohr presented his atomic model which was based on the concept of electron orbits, and which explained spectroscopy as well as the stability of the atom. But, in 1905, the problem with all attempts to define the behavior of the microscopic world was that no one then knew if they needed to consider a similar model to the one known for the macroscopic objects (the model of classical mechanics), or if they should try to develop an entirely new model to give account of new facts. The latter idea, which was followed with the quantum theory, also implied definitively abandoning the unity already found in prior theories of mechanics.

=== Future of mathematical physics ===
Poincaré argued that the advancement of the physical sciences would have to consider a new kind of determinism, giving a new place to chance. And in effect, the history of twentieth century physics is marked by a paradigm where probability reigns. In The Value of Science, Poincaré writes and repeats his enthusiasm for two lines of research : statistical laws (taking the place of differential laws), and relativistic mechanics (taking the place of Newtonian mechanics). Nevertheless, he did not take into account the ideas of Planck. This latter had in 1900 published the spectral laws governing blackbody radiation, which were the foundation of quantum mechanics. In 1905, the same year as the publication of The Value of Science, Albert Einstein published a decisive article on the photoelectric effect, which he based on the work of Planck. Despite the doubts of Poincaré, which were no doubt related to his vision of physics as an approximation of reality (in contrast to the exactness of mathematics), the probabilistic rules of quantum mechanics were clearly the response to the second crisis of mathematical physics, at the end of the nineteenth century. (One can point out that in 1902, Poincaré envisaged a relativistic physics which closely matched, in its theoretical development, the one developed and propounded by Einstein several years later.)

== Objective value of science ==
"What is the purpose of science?" is the question repeatedly asked in Poincaré's book. To this teleological problem, Poincaré responds by taking the opposite position from that of Édouard Le Roy, philosopher and mathematician, who argued in a 1905 article (Sur la logique de l'invention, "On the logic of invention") that science is intrinsically anti-intellectual (in the sense of Henri Bergson) and nominalistic. In contrast to Le Roy, Poincaré follows the thought of Pierre Duhem. He explains that the notion that science is anti-intellectual is self-contradictory, and that the accusation of nominalism can be strongly criticized, because it rests on confusions of thoughts and definitions. He defends the idea of conventional principles, and the idea that scientific activity is not merely a set of conventions arranged arbitrarily around the raw observations of experiment. He wishes rather to demonstrate that objectivity in science comes precisely from the fact that the scientist does no more than translate raw facts into a particular language: "(...) tout ce que crée le savant dans un fait, c'est le langage dans lequel il l'énonce". The only contribution of science would be the development of a more and more mathematized language, a coherent language because it offers predictions which are useful – but not certain, as they remain forever subject to comparisons with real observations, and are always fallible.

== Legacy ==
Richard Feynman contributed in a 1955 paper to the question of the value of science.
