= Keiji Nishitani =

Japanese philosopher (1900–1990)

- 西谷 啓治
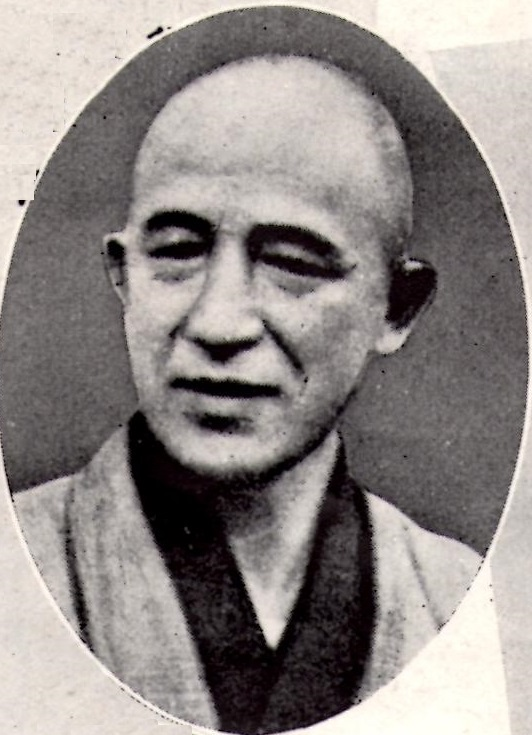
- Born: February 27, 1900; Ishikawa Prefecture, Japan
- Died: November 24, 1990 (aged 90); Kyoto, Japan

Education
- Education: Kyoto Imperial University

Philosophical work
- Era: Contemporary philosophy
- Region: Japanese philosophy; Buddhist philosophy
- School: Kyoto School
- Institutions: Kyoto Imperial University
- Main interests: Philosophy of religion, nihilism, nothingness, emptiness, mysticism
- Notable works: Religion and Nothingness

Keiji Nishitani (西谷 啓治, Nishitani Keiji; February 27, 1900 – November 24, 1990) was a Japanese philosopher. He was a scholar of the Kyoto School and a disciple of Kitarō Nishida. In 1924, Nishitani received his doctorate from Kyoto Imperial University for his dissertation "Das Ideale und das Reale bei Schelling und Bergson". He studied under Martin Heidegger in Freiburg from 1937 to 1939.

== Biography ==
Nishitani was born 1900 in a small town in the Ishikawa prefecture. He was fourteen years old when his father died of tuberculosis, a disease he suffered from too as a child. Nishitani received most of his schooling in Tôkyô where he lived with his mother after his father's death. He did not pass the physical examination of the prestigious Daiichi High School and waited another year to attempt to enroll after recovering that year in Hokkaidô. That year he indulged in the works of Natsume Sôseki. His works inspired some of Nishitani's interest in Zen.

In a memoir he writes that he was afflicted by great suffering after the loss of his father. Facing this despair, he decided to take up the study of philosophy. He writes:

My life as a young man can be described in a single phrase: it was a period absolutely without hope... My life at the time lay entirely in the grips of nihility and despair... My decision then, to study philosophy was in fact – melodramatic as it might sound – a matter of life and death.

In his highschool period he became interested in Zen and especially D. T. Suzuki's interpretation of Zen Buddhism and was less interested in grades. He not only read Japanese works but concerned himself with Western resources. He read works from authors like Dostoevsky, Nietzsche, Ibsen, Emerson, Carlyle, Strindberg and was intrigued by works like the Bible and Nishida's "Thought and Experience."

Inspired by Nishida's works, he enrolled into the philosophy department of the Kyoto Imperial University, where he studied under Nishida Kitarō and Tanabe Hajime, both philosophers categorised into the Kyoto School. In comparison to their work, that tended to be more abstract, Nishitani included his own experiences with Zen Buddhism in his work. Another point of distinction is that he did not just use the language of Western philosophy to better articulate his thoughts; he criticised Western ideas from a Buddhist perspective.

After his graduation in 1924 he taught philosophy at local highschools for eight years and assumed a lectureship in the Ôtani University until 1935. In that time he was interested in Schelling and composed a number of works about him and translated two works of Schelling into Japanese.

At the age of 37 he received a scholarship to study under Bergson, but because of Bergson's poor health he was the appointed to go to the University of Freiburg, where he spent two years studying under Heidegger.

Nishitani held the principal Chair of Philosophy and Religion at Kyoto University from 1943 until becoming emeritus in 1964. He then taught philosophy and religion at Ōtani University. At various times Nishitani was a visiting professor in the United States and Europe. His themes of teaching did not differ in the philosophy and religion department, because in Japanese thought these are not easily distinguishable. As years passed he focused more and more on Buddhist themes and rather used Western ideas to elucidate them.

In the years after the Second World War Nishitani's interest with the topic of nihilism coincided with a resurgence of concern in Europe with the very same topic. In 1949 Nishitani discussed the topic of nihilism in a small group and shortly after composed more and more writings about the topic resulting in his book nihirizumu.

According to James Heisig, after being banned from holding any public position by the United States occupation authorities in July 1946, Nishitani refrained from drawing "practical social conscience into philosophical and religious ideas, preferring to think about the insight of the individual rather than the reform of the social order."

In James Heisig's Philosophers of Nothingness Nishitani is quoted as saying "The fundamental problem of my life ... has always been, to put it simply, the overcoming of nihilism through nihilism."

== Thought ==
On Heisig's reading, Nishitani's philosophy had a distinctive religious and subjective bent, drawing Nishitani close to existentialists and mystics, most notably Søren Kierkegaard and Meister Eckhart, rather than to the scholars and theologians who aimed at systematic elaborations of thought. Heisig further argues that Nishitani, "the stylistic superior of Nishida," brought Zen poetry, religion, literature, and philosophy organically together in his work to help lay the difficult foundations for a breaking free of the Japanese language, in a similar way to Blaise Pascal or Friedrich Nietzsche. Heisig argues that, unlike Nishida who had supposedly focused on building a philosophical system and who towards the end of his career began to focus on political philosophy, Nishitani focused on delineating a standpoint "from which he could enlighten a broader range of topics", and wrote more on Buddhist themes towards the end of his career.

Nishitani's thoughts are also shaped by his study of Western philosophy from the perspective of an outsider, being a person who has grown up in Japan. This enabled him to view Western philosophy in a distanced mode with respect to his own culture. In the essay "Philosophy in Contemporary Japan" (1967) he writes:

We Japanese have fallen heir to two completely different cultures [...].This is a great priviledge that Westeners do not share in [...] but at the same time it puts a heavy responsibility on our shoulders: to lay the foundations of thought for a world in the making, for a new world united beyond differences of East and West.

=== Criticism of Western philosophy ===
In Nishitani's view most Western philosophy deals superficially with phenomena of consciousness, and thereby fails to comprehend the depth of our interactions with people and things. In Nishitani's thought there are three fields: the Field of Consciousness, the Field of Nihility, and the Field of Emptiness. These fields are always present alongside each other and each deeper field encompasses the one before. The Field of Consciousness is the field we experience the world in our everyday life in, the Field of Nihility the one in which we confront death and the Field of Emptiness the one in which both life and death are integrated. Nishitani's criticism of Western philosophy is that it has always been conducted on the Field of Consciousness, where there is no access to a thing in itself but only a representation of it. This is because we take ourselves as a subject looking upon something as an object in our consciousness. On the Field of Emptiness, that Buddhist practice aims towards, things are encountered on their home-ground.

Furthermore, he sees Kant's thought as emblematic for Western thought and its cultures and civilisations. Kant divides reality into immaterial, invisible, subjective consciousness and material, visible objectivity. This introduces a dualism into the Western thinking, that Nishitani rejects. This dualism is most apparent within Christianity in the ethics of an absolute good and absolute evil, right versus wrong and other sharp distinctions. In Nishitani's Buddhist inspired thinking the concept of dependent arising plays an important part: everything is dependent on countless other causes and conditions. This logic inspires the inherent logic of the Western world that unfolds into the modern scientific view. Thus creating an underlying nihility which causes a spiritual void. Especially, in the works of Nietzsche, Heidegger and Sartre this philosophy of nihility becomes apparent. In Nishitani's view, it becomes impossible for the Western world to create meaning from their dualistic and Christian foundations.

He also criticised Descartes's philosophy that the self and things remain separate. This idea is portrayed in Descartes's res cogitans (consciousness), i.e. the self, and res extensa (extended matter), the things around the self, that are differentiated. The res cogitans is taken as the ultimate reality that cannot be doubted, while the res extensa remains without true connection to the res cogitans. This lays the foundation for the natural sciences that treat the world as a lifeless mechanism, material to be used for the self. He sees machinery as the ultimate appropriation of the laws of nature by people and the assertion of a distinguished self.

=== Elemental subjectivity ===
In his first work "A Philosophy of Elemental Subjectivity" published in 1940 Nishitani elucidates his understanding of religion which he sees as an awareness of elemental subjectivity. By calling it "elemental" he contrasts it with the term "fundamental" as something that has no foundation at all. This includes the contradiction of freedom and egoism. In order to break this contradiction one needs to realise the ground of one's freedom and transcendence to be a form of self-deception, isolating oneself from all other things. Realising this an "elemental naturalness" of life will awake. Out of this naturalness a new subjectivity emerges that is outside of categories like good and bad. This subjectivity signals a return to this life in a nothingness beyond being, in a godhead beyond God.

=== Field of consciousness ===
In this field things are experienced within a consciousness that poses oneself as the subjects and other things as objects. Nishitani states that in this field we are unable to encounter things in themselves, in their own mode of being. Moreover, we cannot just get into touch with objects but also ourselves. This is because this field is separated from things, one's emotions, thoughts and desires. People usually stay within this field distracting themselves from the nihility in life distracting themselves in everyday things. The nihility is confronted again when boredom and the meaninglessness of existence rise up again.

=== Field of nihility ===
In the field of nihility the existence of all things, including the self, are turned into a great question mark. One encounters the "Great Doubt" through the annihilation of the ego. This concept is similar to the "Great Death" in Zen Buddhism, that heralds the death of the illusion of the self. Within this transformation the world becomes entrenched with the death, because one realises that everything is impermanent. Nishitani connects this to Heidegger's concept of "being-towards-death"–the encounter with death that most profoundly highlights the question of Being. In this field the relation of life and death becomes clear, it is "death-as-life" and "life-as-death", so Nishitani states:

I shall not say that one should love death; but one should love life with such magnimity, and without calculating exceptions, that one involuntarily always includes death (as the averted half of life) and loves it along with life...it is thinkable that death stands infinitely nearer to us that life itself.

Furthermore, Nishitani characterises the Field of Nihility as a field where everything is cut off from everything else, "[...] the self-enclosure of things is absolute. All things that are scatter apart from one another endlessly."

=== Field of emptiness ===
The field of nihility is necessary to transition to the field of emptiness, because nihility is needed in order to convert to a perception of reality grounded on śūnyatā, the Buddhist concept of emptiness. This nihility then has to be radically questioned. The emptiness of nihility is then emptied itself, resulting in an 'absolute emptiness.' This conversion does not take place willingly, as there is no self anymore to exercise a type of will. After this, a transition of perception takes place:

In contrast to the field of nihility on which the desolate and bottomless abyss distances even the most intimate of persons or things from one another, on the field of emptiness that absolute breach points directly to a most intimate encounter with everything that exists.

Our encounter with things then becomes genuine as we see them for what they truly are without a projection of our consciousness. We are encountering the perspective of the other. Another doctrine of Buddhism, dependent arising, is actualised within perception too. One sees all phenomena as a web of circuminsessional interpretation that links all things together.

The field of emptiness is best achieved by eliminating our ignorance and practising meditation. This is inspired by Dōgen's Zazen practice and his idea of "body-and-mind dropping off." Moreover, a type of thinking of the existential kind can support the transition into the Field of Emptiness. This type of thinking is encouraged by Zen/Chan Kōans. With this type of practice the self has a free access to reality that enables true joy with every interaction. The thinking is no longer under the control of a self, but by the things on encounters as they pass by the Field of Emptiness, "[...] the place where things are on their own home-ground, just as they are, manifest their own suchness."

=== Meister Eckhart ===
Nishitani criticises Christianity for the chasm existing between God and his creation, that comes from the dualistic world view of Christianity. However, his belief shares similarities with Meister Eckhhart's conception of God. He defines God as a godhead which is unknowable, and interpenetrates the deepest human essence while it is interpenetrated by the human essence as well. God is therefore transcendently immanent in his creation. This abandonment of any distinction between immanence and transcendence, and God and his creation is very similar to Nishitani's conception of Śūnyatā (Emptiness), that is totally non-dualistic. Meister Eckhart also used the term "absolute nothingness" for the godhead.

=== Heidegger ===
The philosophical discourse between Nishitani and Heidegger can be viewed as an exchange between Western thought and Zen Buddhism. Nishitani studied under Heidegger in Freiburg and refers to his works frequently in his publications. Likewise, Heidegger was acquainted with the Kyoto School that Nishitani belonged to as one of their biggest representatives. Heidegger in his works made a close connection between being and nothingness, Nishitani comments: "In Heidegger's terms, the being of beings discloses itself in the nullifying of nothingness (das Nichts nichtet)."

=== Existentialism ===
Nishitani sees the existentialist philosophy of Nietzsche, Heidegger and Sartre as a way to achieve a type of Śūnyatā-awareness through the awareness of existential despair. The existential despair can break the perception of everyday life (The Field of Consciousness) by asking the reason for existence and opening up the Field of Nihility.

In works such as Religion and Nothingness, Nishitani focuses on the Buddhist term Śūnyatā (Emptiness/Nothingness) and its relation to Western nihilism. To contrast with the Western idea of nihility as the absence of meaning Nishitani's Śūnyatā relates to the acceptance of Anātman (No-Self), one of the three Right Understandings in the Noble Eightfold Path and the rejection of the ego in order to recognize the Pratītyasamutpāda, to be one with everything. Stating: "All things that are in the world are linked together, one way or the other. Not a single thing comes into being without some relationship to every other thing." Furthermore, he elaborates that Śūnyatā takes place in double negation, the first negation happening through nihility that needs to be negated again to achieve a "transcendence-through-negation-of-all-being." Another definition Nishitani provides for Śūnyatā is: "True emptiness (Śūnyatā) is nothing less than what reaches awareness in all of us as our own absolute self-nature." This self-nature is the disentanglement from self-attachment and in turn allows for the achievement of the insight of non-ego.

However, Nishitani always wrote and understood himself as a philosopher akin in spirit to Nishida insofar as the teacher—always bent upon fundamental problems of ordinary life—sought to revive a path of life walked already by ancient predecessors, most notably in the Zen tradition. Nor can Heisig's reading of Nishitani as "existentialist" convince in the face of Nishitani's critique of existentialism—a critique that walked, in its essential orientation, in the footsteps of Nishida's An Inquiry into the Good (Zen no Kenkyū).

== List of works ==
Collected Works [西谷啓治著作集] 26 Vols. (Tokyo: Sōbunsha [創文社], 1986–95) [CW].

- CW1: Philosophy of Fundamental Subjectivity, Vol. 1 [根源的主体性の哲学 正] (Tokyo: Kōbundō [弘文堂], 1940)
  - Part I: Religion and Culture [宗教と文化]
    - 'Nietzsche's Zarathustra and Meister Eckhart' [ニイチェのツァラツストラとマイスター・エックハルト] (Festschrift for Professor Hatano Sei'ichi [哲学及び宗教とその歴史——波多野精一先生献呈論文集], Iwanami Shoten, September 1938)
    - 'Religion, History, Culture' [宗教・歴史・文化] (Tetsugaku Kenkyū [哲学研究], No. 250, January 1937)
    - 'Modern Consciousness and Religion' [近代意識と宗教] (Keizai Ōrai [経済往来], Vol. 10, No. 7, July 1935)
    - 'Modern European Civilisation and Japan' [近世欧羅巴文明と日本] (Shisō [思想], No. 215-16, April–May 1940)
  - Part II: History and Nature [歴史と自然]
    - 'Timeliness and Untimeliness in Morality' [道徳における時代性と恒常性] (Risō [理想], No. 48, 1933)
    - 'The Historical and the Congenital' [歴史的なるものと先天的なるもの] (Shisō [思想], No. 109-10, June–July 1931)
    - 'Patterns of Human Interpretation and Their Significance' [人間解釈の類型性とその意義] (Risō [理想], No. 55–56, 1935)
    - 'Individuality and Universality in Life' [生における個別と一般] (Ōtani Gakuhō [大谷学報], Vol. 12, No. 3, October 1931)
- CW2: Philosophy of Fundamental Subjectivity, Vol. 2 [根源的主体性の哲学 続]
  - Part III: Thought and Will [思惟と意志]
    - 'On the Problem of Evil' [悪の問題について] (Tetsugaku Kenkyū [哲学研究], No. 142, 1928)
    - 'Schelling's Identity Philosophy and the Will: The Real and the Ideal' [シェリングの同一哲学と意志——実在的なるものと観念的なるもの] (Tetsugaku Kenkyū [哲学研究], No. 104–5, 1924)
    - 'Transcendentality of the Object: Spiritualism of No Spirit' [対象の超越性——無心の唯心論] (Shisō [思想], No. 44, June 1925)
    - 'Kant's Aesthetic Ideas: The Link Between Intuition and Feeling' [カントの審美的理念——直観と感情との聯関] (Shisō [思想], No. 51, January 1926)
    - 'Miscellaneous Thoughts on Religion' [宗教雑感] (Shisō [思想], No. 77, March 1928)
    - 'Dialectic of Religious Existence' [宗教的実存の弁証法] (Shisō [思想], No. 159-61, August–October 1935)
- CW3: Studies on Western Mysticism [西洋神秘思想の研究]
  - 'A History of Mysticism' [神秘思想史] (Iwanami Kōza: Tetsugaku [岩波講座・哲学], Vol. 4, 1932)
  - 'Mysticism's Ethical Thought' [神秘主義の倫理思想] (Iwanami Kōza: Rinrigaku [岩波講座・倫理学], Vol. 14, 1941)
  - 'The Problem of Mysticism' [神秘主義の問題] (Tetsugaku Kenkyū [哲学研究], No. 334, 1944)
  - 'Mysticism' [神秘主義] (Gendai Kirisutokyō Kōza [現代キリスト教講座], Vol. 4, 1956)
  - 'Plotinus' Philosophy' [プロティノスの哲学] (Naganoken Suwa Tetsugakukai [長野県諏訪哲学会], Summer 1929)
  - 'The Problem of Evil in Augustine' [アウグスティヌスにおける悪の問題] (Tetsugaku [哲学], Vol. 1, No. 3, 1946)
  - 'The Problem of Knowledge in Augustine' [アウグスティヌスにおける知の問題] (Kirisutokyō Bunka [基督教文化], No. 31, November 1948)
  - 'Augustine and the Position of Contemporary Thought' [アウグスティヌスと現代の思想境位] (Kirisutokyō Bunka [基督教文化], No. 34, March 1949)
- CW4: Contemporary Society's Problems and Religion [現代社会の諸問題と宗教]
  - Part I: Contemporary Society's Problems and Religion [現代社会の諸問題と宗教]
    - Religion, Politics and Culture [宗教と政治と文化] (Kyoto: Hōzōkan [法蔵館], 1949)
    - 'Problems of Contemporary Religion' [現代における宗教の諸問題]
    - Contemporary Society's Problems and Religion [現代社会の諸問題と宗教] (Kyoto: Hōzōkan [法蔵館], 1951)
  - Part II: Philosophy of World History and Historical Consciousness [世界史の哲学と歴史的意識]
    - 'Philosophy of World History' [世界史の哲学]
    - Worldview and Stateview [世界観と国家観] (Tokyo: Kōbundō [弘文堂], 1941)
    - 'Historical Consciousness' [歴史的意識]
- CW5: Aristotle Studies [アリストテレス論考] (Tokyo: Kōbundō [弘文堂], 1948)
  - 'Aristotle's Theory of Sensation' [アリストテレスの感性論]
  - 'Aristotle's Theory of Imagination' [アリストテレスの構想論]
  - 'Aristotle's Theory of the Intellect' [アリストテレスの理性論]
- CW6: Philosophy of Religion [宗教哲学]
  - 'Prolegomena to Philosophy of Religion' [宗教哲学——序論]
  - 'Religion and Philosophy' [宗教と哲学]
  - 'Introduction to Philosophy of Religion' [宗教哲学——研究入門]
  - 'Marxism and Religion' [マルクシズムと宗教]
  - 'The Problem of Evil' [悪の問題]
  - 'Buddhism and Christianity' [仏教とキリスト教]
  - 'The Problem of Mythology' [神話の問題]
  - 'The Transethical' [倫理を超えるもの]
  - 'Science and Religion' [科学と宗教]
- CW7: God and the Absolute Nothing [神と絶対無]
  - God and the Absolute Nothing [神と絶対無] (Tokyo: Kōbundō [弘文堂], 1948)
  - 'German Mysticism and German Philosophy' [ドイツ神秘主義とドイツ哲学]
- CW8: Nihilism [ニヒリズム]
  - Nihilism [ニヒリズム] (Tokyo: Kōbundō [弘文堂], 1949)
  - 'Nihilism and Existence in Nietzsche' [ニイチェにおけるニヒリズム=実存]
  - Russian Nihilism [ロシアの虚無主義] (Tokyo: Kōbundō [弘文堂], 1949)
  - 'Problems of Atheism' [無神論の問題]
- CW9: Nishida's Philosophy and Tanabe's Philosophy [西田哲学と田辺哲学]
  - Nishida Kitarō [西田幾多郎] (Tokyo: Chikuma Shobō [筑摩書房], 1985)
  - 'On Tanabe's Philosophy' [田辺哲学について]
  - 'Professor Tanabe's Thought in His Final Years' [田辺先生最晩年の思想]
- CW10: What is Religion: Essays on Religion, Vol. 1 [宗教とは何か——宗教論集I] (Tokyo: Sōbunsha [創文社], 1961)
  - 'What is Religion?' [宗教とは何か]
  - 'Personhood and Non-Personhood in Religion' [宗教における人格性と非人格性]
  - 'Nihil and Śūnyatā' [虚無と空]
  - 'The Position of Śūnyatā' [空の立場]
  - 'Śūnyatā and Time' [空と時]
  - 'Śūnyatā and History' [空と歴史]
- CW11: The Standpoint of Zen: Essays on Religion, Vol. 2 [禅の立場——宗教論集II] (Tokyo: Sōbunsha [創文社], 1986)
- CW12: Hanshan's Poetry [寒山詩] (Tokyo: Chikuma Shobō [筑摩書房], 1986)
- CW13: Philosophical Studies [哲学論考]
  - 'The Problem of Being and the Problem of Ontology' [存在の問題と存在論の問題]
  - 'Prajñā and Reason' [般若と理性]
  - 'On Satori' [「覚」について]
  - 'Śūnyatā and Pṛthak' [空と即]
  - 'Schelling's Absolute Idealism and Bergson's Pure Duration' [シェリングの絶対的観念論とベルグソンの純粋持続]
  - 'A Brief Biography of Schelling' [シェリング略伝]
  - 'Schelling and Bergson: A Survey of Their Works' [シェリング及びベルグソン（著作解題）]
- CW14: Lectures on Philosophy, Vol. 1 [講話 哲学I]
- CW15: Lectures on Philosophy, Vol. 2 [講話 哲学II]
- CW16: Lectures on Religion [講話 宗教]
- CW17: Lectures on Buddhism [講話 仏教]
- CW18: Lectures on Zen and Jōdo [講話 禅と浄土]
- CW19: Lectures on Culture [講話 文化]
- CW20: Occasional Essays, Vol. 1 [隨想I]
- CW21: Occasional Essays, Vol. 2 [隨想II]
- CW22: Lectures on Shōbōgenzō, Vol. 1 [正法眼蔵講話I]
- CW23: Lectures on Shōbōgenzō, Vol. 2 [正法眼蔵講話II]
- CW24: Lectures at Ōtani University, Vol. 1 [大谷大学講義I]
- CW25: Lectures at Ōtani University, Vol. 2 [大谷大学講義II]
- CW26: Lectures at Ōtani University, Vol. 3 [大谷大学講義III]

=== English translations ===
==== Monographs ====
- Nishitani Keiji. 1982. Religion and Nothingness. Translated by Jan Van Bragt. Berkeley: University of California Press. ISBN 0-520-04946-2.
- Nishitani Keiji. 1990. The Self-Overcoming of Nihilism. Translated by Graham Parkes and Aihara Setsuko. Albany: State University of New York Press.
- Nishitani Keiji. 1991. Nishida Kitarō. Translated by Yamamoto Seisaku and James W. Heisig. Berkeley: University of California Press.
- Nishitani Keiji. 2006. On Buddhism. Translated by Yamamoto Seisaku and Robert E. Carter. Albany: State University of New York Press.
- Nishitani Keiji. 2012. The Philosophy of Nishitani Keiji 1900-1990: Lectures on Religion and Modernity. Translated by Jonathan Morris Augustine and Yamamoto Seisaku. New York: The Edwin Mellen Press. ISBN 0-7734-2930-1.

==== Articles ====
- Nishitani Keiji. 1960. "The Religious Situation in Present-Day Japan." Contemporary Religions in Japan, 7–24.
- Nishitani Keiji. 1984. "Standpoint of Zen." Translated by John C. Maraldo. The Eastern Buddhist 17/1, 1–26.
- Nishitani Keiji. 1989. "Encounter with Emptiness." In The Religious Philosophy of Nishitani Keiji (edited by Taitetsu Unno). Jain Publishing Company. 1–4.
- Nishitani Keiji. 1990. "Religious-Philosophical Existence in Buddhism." Translated by Paul Shepherd. The Eastern Buddhist (New Series) 23, 1–17.
- Nishitani Keiji. 2004a. "The Awakening of Self in Buddhism." In The Buddha Eye: An Anthology of the Kyoto School and Its Contemporaries (edited by Frederick Franck). World Wisdom: Bloomington, Indiana. 11–20.
- Nishitani Keiji. 2004b. "The I-Thou Relation in Zen Buddhism." In The Buddha Eye: An Anthology of the Kyoto School and Its Contemporaries (edited by Frederick Franck). World Wisdom: Bloomington, Indiana. 39–53.
- Nishitani Keiji. 2004c. "Science and Zen." In The Buddha Eye: An Anthology of the Kyoto School and Its Contemporaries (edited by Frederick Franck). World Wisdom: Bloomington, Indiana. 107–135.
- Nishitani Keiji. 2008. "My Views on "Overcoming Modernity"." In Overcoming Modernity: Cultural Identity in Wartime Japan (translated and edited by Richard Calichman). New York: Columbia University Press. 51–63.
