= Masao Abe =

Japanese Buddhist

- 阿部 正雄
- Born: 1915; Osaka, Japan
- Died: September 10, 2006 (aged 90–91); Kyoto, Japan

Education
- Education: Kyoto University

Philosophical work
- Era: 20th-century philosophy
- Region: Japanese philosophy
- School: Buddhist philosophy
- Institutions: Nara University
- Main interests: Comparative religion

Masao Abe (阿部 正雄, Abe Masao; 1915 – September 10, 2006) was a Japanese Buddhist philosopher and religious studies scholar who was emeritus professor at Nara University. He is best known for his work in comparative religion, developing a Buddhist-Christian interfaith dialogue which later also included Judaism. His mature views were developed within the Kyoto School of philosophy. According to Christopher Ives: "Since the death of D. T. Suzuki in 1966, Masao Abe has served as the main representative of Zen Buddhism in Europe and North America."

== Life and career ==
=== Training ===
Abe's father was a medical doctor, his mother a practitioner of Jōdo Shinshū Pure Land Buddhism, from whom came his early faith in Amida Buddha. Born in Osaka, Abe was the third of six children. His higher education began at Osaka Municipal University, where he studied Economics and Law. For four years during the late 1930s he worked in a business office at a private trading company in neighboring Kobe. Yet Abe was seriously troubled by an ongoing personal crisis, which stemmed from the perceived conflict: rationality versus faith in the Amida of Pure Land Buddhism. This conflict he thought he could conclusively resolve in favor of faith through the study of philosophy, by which he could overcome objections posed by reason.

Abe entered Kyoto Imperial University in April 1942. It was a courageous step, as he changed career direction in mid-stream, exceptional in Japanese life, yet even more so considering the current political situation. He studied Western philosophy under Hajime Tanabe. Also, Abe studied Zen under the direction of Shin'ichi Hisamatsu, a philosophy professor at Kyoto University and a lay practitioner of the Rinzai school. Guided by Hisamatsu, Abe worked with others to revitalize Buddhist youth organization at Kyoto University throughout the 1940s. Professor Hisamatsu challenged Abe's quasi-theistic faith in Amida Buddha; instead Hisamatsu became for Abe a vital religious model, of a rigorous adherent of Śūnyatā (which may be called Emptiness) as an ultimate reality. In consequence, Abe came to understand Amida Buddha as a sacred fiction.

Abe's spiritual progression under Hisamatsu was complex and dialectical. Hisamatsu taught that the revered image of Amida Buddha was but a stage on the way to realizing a "formless" Buddha, whereby one could awaken to one's True Self. Nonetheless Abe first reacted to Hisamatsu by coming to discover and experience an infinite grace from the Amida Buddha. Abe's profound quest continued. In December 1951, during a group Zen sitting at the Reiun Temple of the Myōshin-ji in Kyoto, Abe personally challenged Hisamatsu, screaming to him, "Is that the True Self?" Hisamatsu replied, "That's the True Self." Thereafter Abe entered an intense phase and struggled with the view that "It's all a lie!" (which he cried out while dousing himself with a bucket of ice water at a subsequent group sitting). He agonized over the seeming proximity of the deity and the devil, and with his own complicity. Finally, Abe told Hisamatsu, "I just cannot find any place where I can stand." Hisamatsu told him, "Stand right at that place where there is nowhere to stand."

Along this way Abe confronted, and managed to distinguish and overcome, a "positive nihilism" associated with the irreligious philosopher Friedrich Nietzsche. Reflecting on his life development, Abe acknowledged the crucial role of Shin'ichi Hisamatsu in his spiritual formation. "Without him I am not what I am."

=== Academia ===
Among Abe's chief academic influences would be the aforementioned Shin'ichi Hisamatsu (1889–1980) and also Keiji Nishitani (1900–1990), as well as Hajime Tanabe (1885–1962), key professors for Abe at Kyoto University, and Kitarō Nishida (1870–1945), teacher of Hisamatsu and Nishitani, and teacher of his own successor Tanabe. Abe follows Nishida's Kyoto School of philosophy. During the 1950s and early 1960s Abe was in communication with the well-known Buddhist scholar Daisetsu Teitaro Suzuki (1870–1966), e.g., at Columbia University in New York City; Abe is said to have later assumed Suzuki's role as academic transmitter of Buddhism. Also in New York City, at the Union Theological Seminary, Abe encountered the Christian professors and teachers Paul Tillich (1886–1965) and Reinhold Niebuhr (1892–1971).

From 1952 to 1980, Abe served as professor of philosophy at Nara University. Before he had been professor at Kyoto Women's College (1946–1948) and Ōtani University (1948–1950). Thereafter, while at Nara, Abe was concurrently professor at Kyoto University from 1955 to 1958, and from 1964-1980 professor at Hana Zono University. Also in the mid-1950s he studied Christian theology in New York City at the Union Theological Seminary and at Columbia University. Then in 1980 he left Nara University and moved to California, to the Department of Religion at the Claremont Graduate School, and later in 1983 to the University of Hawaiʻi where he served as Professor of Japanese philosophy. From 1965 Abe participated and made presentations at many universities and colleges throughout the United States while serving as a visiting professor in residence (with his wife Ikuko). During these years Abe shared in the Buddhist-Christian dialogue while at universities in Europe.

Abe contributed to and led many conferences on comparative religion, Buddhism, and related subjects. He was perennially involved with: the East-West Philosophers' Conference at the University of Hawaiʻi; and the International Buddhist-Christian Theological Encounter (the "Abe-Cobb group") which, along with Professor John B. Cobb, Jr., Abe directed.

In addition to his contributions of creative insight and scholarship, Masao Abe also brought to interfaith meetings a serenity and a quiet charm. Here, for example, his fellow academic Arvind Sharma recalls a moment with Abe at a conference in 1986:

Abe broke into a smile. I still remember it vividly because it had a compelling ineffable quality about it. It was so totally unencumbered. It seemed curiously and totally detached from the environment, a happening complete in itself, with a childlike simplicity beguiling in its guilelessness. When his face assumed its normal expression, one was left with the feeling of something very precious—found fleetingly and then lost irretrievably—until he smiled again.

Apparently, the source of this "giving gift" had passed through spiritual trials. Abe earlier was required to walk down a path of terrifying dread, and to make a leap into the abyss, in order to find "that place where there is nowhere to stand."

=== Dialogue ===
Abe sought to advance the interreligious dialogue while serving in his widespread teaching assignments; he led many seminars on Buddhism and western religions, particularly Christianity. A frequent procedure followed by the convened representatives of different religions was: first to attempt to understand the other's faith perspective from the inside (without compromising each one's own faith), to the extent of being able to "see" how things may look from the other's point of view; second, there would follow a period during which each would "return" to their own faith; thereafter, a more fruitful discussion might commence. Abe further sought to encourage dialogue through his various philosophical and spiritual writings.

Generally Abe has received praise for his efforts. Professor Jürgen Moltmann found that the Buddhist scholar's presentation was profound and precise concerning a central topic of Christian theology. "Here reciprocal understanding is not only furthered, but Christianity and Buddhism in their immiscible difference are led into a common reality. In light of this common reality, perhaps a mutual transformation does not yet begin, but certainly a reciprocal liking and opening for each other."

In 1983 Professor Abe disclosed aspects of his inner motivation. He wrote that, in addition to his abiding interest in Buddhism, he was profoundly concerned with the spiritual foundation for all of "humanity in a global age. To provide this foundation, a comparative and dialogical study of Buddhism and Western thought, Christianity included, is absolutely necessary."

== An essays with responses ==
- Abe's essay is entitled "Kenotic God and Dynamic Śūnyatā", which discusses Emptiness in Christianity and Buddhism. Abe refers to St. Paul in his letter to the Philippians 2:5-11, especially the verses stating that "Christ Jesus, who, though he was in the form of God, did not count equality with God a thing to be grasped, but emptied himself, taking the form of a servant, being born in the likeness of men." Abe eventually extrapolates to posit an emptying of God the Father, and hence an ontological resemblance between Christianity and the Buddhist concept of emptiness as an ultimate reality. In the process, Abe discusses Buddhist social ethics and social responsibility. Also, he addresses the Shoah; here, he raises the difficult issue of a "collective karma" manifested in guilt felt by those far removed from the time and locale of these genocidal crimes. Abe writes for an educated multi-religious readership, with keen awareness and observation, informed to a certain extent by Process theology developed within modern Christianity, and from a perspective nurtured in the Kyoto School of Buddhist philosophy. His essay has been published as follows.
  - The Emptying God: A Buddhist-Jewish-Christian Conversation (Maryknoll, New York: Orbis 1990), edited by John B. Cobb, Jr., and Christopher Ives. Professor Cobb was a leader in Process theology. Herein Abe's essay "Kenotic God and Dynamic Śūnyatā" appears, which is addressed by one Jewish (Eugene Borowitz) and six Christian (Thomas J. J. Altizer, John B. Cobb, Jr., Catherine Keller, Jürgen Moltmann, Schubert M. Ogden, and David Tracy) theologians. Then follows a "Rejoinder" by Abe. Several subsequent responses and replies appear in the journal Buddhist-Christian Studies (Honolulu: University of Hawaiʻi).
  - Divine Emptiness and Historical Fullness. A Buddhist-Jewish-Christian Conversation with Masao Abe (Valley Forge: Trinity Press 1995), edited by Christopher Ives. Abe's essay "Kenotic God and Dynamic Śūnyatā" appears again (Part I) and is addressed afresh by eight new scholars. Two Jewish responses by Richard Rubenstein and Sandra B. Lubarsky are followed by four Christian, i.e., by Heinrich Ott, Marjorie Hewitt Suchocki, Hans Waldenfels, and Christopher Ives (Part II). Abe then replies (Part III). The conclusion presents the two responses of Hans Küng, and of Wolfhart Pannenberg, to each of which Abe replies (Part IV).
    - Book Review by Edward L. Shirley
    - Book Review by Harold Kasimow
  - Previously Abe had authored a forerunner of this essay, entitled "Buddhism and Christianity as a Problem of Today". It appeared in the periodical Japanese Religions in 1963, here also followed by Western responses.

== A Zen view of time ==
According to this scholar, realization through Zen practice of the Buddhist teaching of the impermanence of all things (Sanskrit: anātman; Japanese: mujō) leads practitioners to understand life as a continuous process of living and dying at every moment. From this perspective, when life is grasped subjectively from within rather than objectively from without, it is not seen as a movement from life to death but as an ongoing experience of living-dying. Drawing on a careful reading of Dōgen (1200–1253) and an attentive interpretation of the inner sense of time, Abe argues that the objectification of time can alienate individuals from their lived experience of impermanence.

Dōgen puzzled over a seeming contradiction in Buddhism. All sentient beings are originally enlightened, yet Buddhist teachings "arouse the longing for enlightenment" in those who hear it. If we do religious practice we may become enlightened due to an "acquired awakening" yet "original awakening" is ours "before our parents were born". Dōgen rejects as naturalistic fallacy a theory of "original awakening" that would equate a given human self-consciousness with genuine enlightenment. Also Dōgen rejects the idea that practice is a means to the goal of enlightenment. The process of enlightenment is undertaken by Zen practice, but the process itself becomes enlightenment, i.e., the path is the way of awakening. Abe quotes Dōgen: "In the Buddha Dharma, practice and realization are identical. [O]ne's initial negotiating of the Way in itself is the whole of original realization. Thus, even while directed to practice, one is told not to anticipate a realization apart from practice, because practice points directly to original realization."

Instead of waiting for the time of awakening while sitting in meditation, one is "directly knowing temporal conditions" for the "time has already arrived." "There is no time that is not the right time." "Dōgen denies continuity of time and emphasizes the independence of each point of time..." Prof. Abe then quotes Dōgen to illustrate:

"[I]t being an established teaching of Buddhism not to speak of life becoming death, Buddhism speaks of the unborn. It being a confirmed Buddhist teaching that death does not become life, it speaks of non-extinction. Life is a stage of time and death is a stage of time, like, for example, winter and spring. We do not suppose that winter becomes spring, or say that spring becomes summer."

Subjectively from within, "the process of our living-dying [is] being without beginning and without end." For Buddhists, there is no beginning of the universe (no creation), and there is no end (no last judgment). "We must realize the beginninglessness and endlessness of saṃsāra, that is, the transmigration of living-dying." Prof. Abe mentions several experiences:

- "[E]ach and every moment can be a beginning and an end in itself: time begins and ends with each moment. Accordingly, time is not understood to be a unidirectional movement but is seen as a sheer series of moments that can move reciprocally. Here a sort of reversibility of time is realized."
- "[I]f we clearly realize the beginninglessness and endlessness of living-dying at this particular moment, the whole process of living-dying is concentrated within this moment. In other words, each moment embraces the whole process of beginningless and endless time within itself. Thus, one can in fact transcend time at this very moment."
- "The Buddhist view, based on full immersion in the depth of the moment, is that there is no difference between past and future. The temporal distinction belongs to the observer's perspective on the horizontal and historical plane. In the vertical or depth dimension, Buddhists insist, time is overcome."
- "Although karma works deterministically on the horizontal dimension of time, once the vertical, or transtemporal, dimension is opened up as one awakens to the truth of no-self, that person is no longer a slave to karma but becomes its master. This means that on the basis of the realization of the true self as no-self at the bottomless depth of the vertical dimension of time, the present act can emancipate one's self from past karma and create new karma that will affect the future as, for instance, in the form of a vow."

== Selected bibliography ==
=== Author ===
- Zen and Western Thought (London: Macmillan; University of Hawaiʻi 1985), edited by William R. LaFleur, with foreword by John Hick.
- A Study of Dōgen. His Philosophy and Religion (State University of New York 1992), a collection of his articles edited by Steven Heine.
- Buddhism and Interfaith Dialogue (University of Hawaiʻi 1995), a collection of his articles edited by Steven Heine (ISBN 0-8248-1751-6).
- Zen and Comparative Studies (University of Hawaiʻi 1997), a collection of his articles edited by Steven Heine (ISBN 0-8248-1832-6).
- Zen and the Modern World: A Third Sequel to Zen and Western Thought (University of Hawaiʻi 2003), a collection of his articles edited by Steven Heine.
- "Buddhism" at pages 69–137, in Our Religions. The Seven World Religions Introduced by Preeminent Scholars from Each Tradition, edited by Arvind Sharma (HarperOne 1994).

=== Collaborations ===
- The Emptying God: A Buddhist-Jewish-Christian Conversation (Maryknoll, New York: Orbis Press 1990), edited by John B. Cobb, Jr., and Christopher Ives (ISBN 0-88344-670-7). Reprint 2005 by Wipf and Stock, Eugene, Oregon.
- Divine Emptiness and Historical Fullness. A Buddhist-Jewish-Christian Conversation with Masao Abe (Valley Forge: Trinity Press 1995), edited by Christopher Ives.
- Masao Abe. A Zen Life of Dialogue (Boston: Charles E. Tuttle 1998), edited by Donald W. Mitchell.

=== Editor or translator ===
- Editor: A Zen Life. D. T. Suzuki Remembered (Boston: Charles E. Tuttle 1998).
- Translation with Richard DeMartino: Hisamatsu Shin'ichi, "The Characteristics of Oriental Nothingness", in Philosophical Studies of Japan (Tokyo 1960), 2: pages 65–97.
- Translation with Christopher Ives: Kitaro Nishida, An Inquiry into the Good (Yale University 1990), of Zen no Kenkyū, introduced by Abe.
- Translation with Norman Waddell: Dōgen, The Heart of Dōgen's Shōbōgenzō (State University of New York 2002), from work published in The Eastern Buddhist (Kyoto 1971–1976), as edited by D. T. Suzuki.

== See also ==
- Sunyata
- Soto school (Zen)
- Rinzai school (Zen)
- Buddhism in Japan
- Buddhism and Christianity
- Interreligious dialogue
