= Nishi Shinichiro =

Japanese philosopher

Shinichirō Nishi
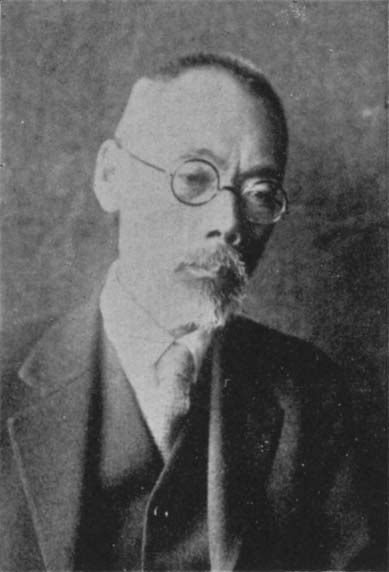
- Born: March 29, 1873; Tottori City, Tottori Prefecture, Japan
- Died: November 13, 1943 (aged 70)

Education
- Education: Tokyo University

Philosophical work
- Era: 20th-century philosophy
- Region: Japanese philosophy
- Institutions: Hiroshima University of Science and Literature (広島文理科大学)
- Main interests: Philosophy, Ethics

Shinichirō Nishi (西晋一郎, Nishi Shinichirō, March 1873 – November 1943) was a Japanese philosopher and ethicist, and a contemporary of Nishida Kitaro. Although a prolific and well-known writer during his lifetime, in the post-war era he fell into posthumous obscurity due to his perceived ideological support for Japanese ultra nationalism.

As a student, Nishi belonged to the very first cohort who undertook degrees at the newly established philosophy department at Tokyo University (then known as Tokyo Imperial University), studying western philosophy and European languages under figures such as Raphael von Koeber. Nishi would become well read when it came to Western philosophy, studying Descartes, Spinoza, Leibniz, Rousseau, Kant, Schiller, Fichte, Schleiermacher, Hegel, Herbart, Lotze, Wundt, Windelband, Rickert, Cohen, Bergson, Poincaré, and many others.

Together with Nishida Kitaro, Nishi was referred to as one of the "Two Nishi's" (両西, ryō-nishi). In Hiroshima prefecture, where Nishi taught classes on ethics, he was a particularly respected figure. A phrase bandied about was "there is a Nishi in the West" (“西に西あり”, nishi ni, nishi ari). Nishi’s similarities with Nishida do not end here. He also started out in a similar fashion with respects to his own research, focusing on Kant, and, later, attempting to overcome the problems he saw in Kantianism by proceeding on to Bergson. Nishi even shared with Nishida an admiration of the educator Hōjō Tokiyuki (北条時敬). It was Hōjō who had recommended to Nishida that he undertake Zen training, and he actually made the same recommendation to Nishi.

In fact, Nishi would earn a degree of public recognition sooner than Nishida, by producing the first Japanese translation of Thomas Hill Green’s book, Prolegomena to Ethics, nearly a decade before the publication of Nishida's An Inquiry Into the Good (善の研究 Zen no Kenkyū.) Nishi also received significant public attention for his contribution in calming down a national furor in 1931, regarding the government’s proposal to restructure the system of higher education and abolish some of the old high schools.

== Philosophy ==
Nishi provides a basic summary of his perspective on 'Western learning' and 'Eastern learning' in the introductory chapter to his 1934 work, Eastern Ethics (東洋倫理).

Nishi argues that western learning in general, including both science and philosophy, is “learning for the sake of learning”; an abstract, amoral, foreign import. He claims that “Eastern learning”, meanwhile, is fundamentally a different kind of learning which comes from a different source; a moral reverence for teaching, over an individualistic, eros driven love of truth itself. Over and against such "selfish" “learning for the sake of learning”, Nishi claims that Eastern learning is so-called “practical” or “real” learning (実学, jitsugaku), connected to all the important aspects of cultured, communal life, and existing to serve the needs of such a life. For Nishi, to understand what the great masters or sages have left to us, is to understand everything that is truly important for the purposes of properly living as a human being.

Nishi uses the techniques of modern scholarship, of modern thinking, to articulate the inner meaning of his tradition, while at the same time asserting its fundamental superiority. Yet Nishi cannot achieve this move by recasting his tradition as “Japanese philosophy” in the manner of Feng Youlan and Chinese philosophy. Nishi would find such a category to be both insufficient for grasping the meaning of the tradition, as well as already a kind of capitulation. That is to say, Nishi argued that not only was the Japanese tradition not ‘philosophical’, but that it was superior. In this respect his approach is very different to the contemporary standpoint of comparative philosophy, which reads philosophy as a global, trans-cultural phenomenon.

== Legacy ==
However, while Nishida Kitarō remains well known, both inside and outside of Japan, with his major works translated into multiple languages, Nishi Shinichirō is today a little known figure. Although he published some forty odd books and papers, few if any of these works are in print, and none have appeared in English. This is because while Nishida’s reputation largely survived the ‘dark valley’ of the era of ultra-nationalism unscathed, Nishi’s did not. He is regarded as having been a far more enthusiastic promoter of so-called Kokutai-ron (国体論), of discourse about a special Japanese sovereignty derived from the divinity of the imperial household. Many of Nishi's works in the 1930s were published through the Centre for National Spiritual Culture, which was established in 1932 as part of a government sponsored effort towards a so-called “national spiritual mobilization” (国民精神総動員). After the surrender of Japan, the center was shut down by the occupying authorities in late 1945, after being designated as an Ultra Nationalist organization, with its associated instructors purged from public office. Nishi’s philosophical legacy is therefore quite indelibly connected to the nationalism of the 1930s and 40s. It is due to this connection that some commentators (such as Yoshida Kōhei) have claimed that Nishi was "willfully forgotten."

However, in recent years a number of works have begun to appear in Japanese, discussing Nishi's thought and legacy in a more positive light.
