= Shin'ichi Hisamatsu =

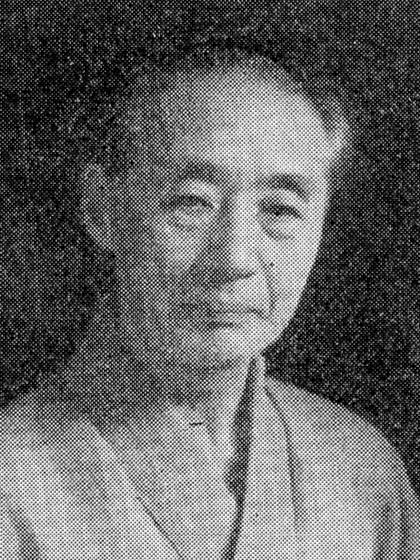
- Born: 5 June 1889; Gifu Prefecture, Japan
- Died: 27 February 1980 (aged 90)

Education
- Academic advisor: Kitaro Nishida

Philosophical work
- Era: 20th-century philosophy
- Region: Japanese philosophy
- School: Kyoto School; Zen Buddhism
- Main interests: Human suffering

Shin'ichi Hisamatsu (久松 真一, Hisamatsu Shin'ichi; June 5, 1889 – February 27, 1980) was a philosopher, Zen Buddhist scholar, and Japanese tea ceremony (sadō or chadō, 茶道, "the way of tea") master. He was a professor at Kyoto University and received an honorary doctoral degree from Harvard University.

== Biography ==
Hisamatsu was born in Gifu Prefecture, Japan. He entered Kyoto University in 1912 and studied philosophy with Kitarō Nishida, one of the most prominent Japanese philosophers of his time and the author of An Inquiry into the Good. With Nishida's recommendation, Hisamatsu joined the Rinzai Zen monastery of Myōshin-ji in Kyoto in 1915 and studied Zen Buddhism with Zen Master Ikegami Shōsan. After his monastic life at Myōshin-ji, he established his original philosophical view, which consists of both Eastern (mainly Zen Buddhist) and Western philosophy. Shortly after that, Hisamatsu received a doctorate degree from Kyoto University.

Between 1943 and 1949, he taught philosophy and religious studies at Kyoto University. While in Kyoto, Hisamatsu frequently discussed Zen Buddhism and philosophy with D. T. Suzuki at Shunkō-in, where he lived. He also became the teacher of Masao Abe. Abe became a leader in interfaith dialogue. In 1958 Hisamatsu and Carl Jung held a brief conversation in Switzerland. "Specifically, their conversation centered on Jung's notion of Self and the Zen notion of 'No Mind', as well as their respective views of human suffering and its alleviation." Each appeared to see, however, that then a genuine understanding in depth was premature. Even as they spoke through translators, the key words were susceptible to multiple interpretations.

Hisamatsu was a founder of the FAS Society. The FAS Society’s origin, Gakudō Dōjō, was established by students of Kyoto University under Hisamatsu's guidance. In 1960, Gakudō Dōjō was renamed FAS Society for their international activities. The purpose of this society is to spread the standpoint of the fundamental self-awakening of all mankind.

In the Netherlands and Belgium, the message of Hisamatsu is kept alive by Zen teacher Ton Lathouwers.
