= Heinrich Dumoulin =

Jesuit priest

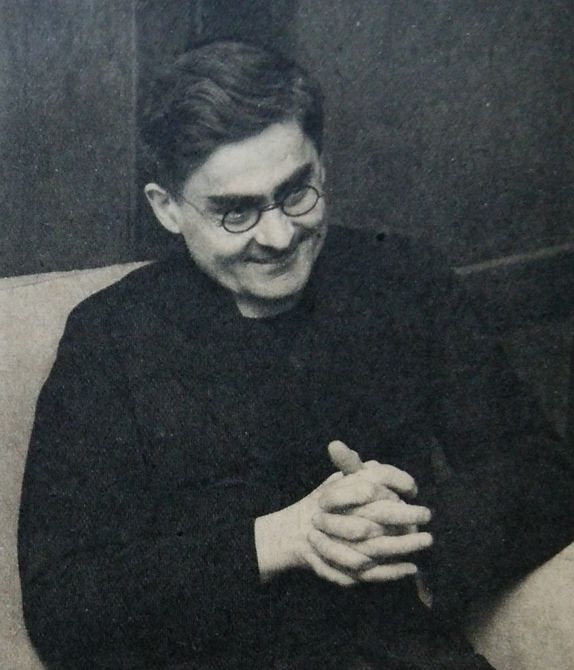
Heinrich Dumoulin

Heinrich Dumoulin, S.J. (31 May 1905 – 21 July 1995) was a Jesuit theologian, a widely published author on Zen, and a professor of philosophy and history at Sophia University in Tokyo, where he was Professor Emeritus. He was the founder of its Institute for Oriental Religions, as well as the first director of the Nanzan Institute for Religion and Culture.

== Biography and career ==
Dumoulin was born in the village of Wevelinghoven, Rhineland, Germany, the son of a notary public. He studied philosophy in Holland and France, receiving his doctoral degree in 1929, and was ordained as a Jesuit priest in 1933. In 1935, he was sent to Japan on missions under the guidance of Fr. Hugo Enomiya-Lassalle, where he became fluent in the Shinto religion and Buddhism.

Dumoulin was a scholar of Zen Buddhism and wrote several books on its history, first urged to do it by the American Buddhist Ruth Fuller Sasaki. His Zen Buddhism: A history was published in 1988, translated from the original German by James Heisig and Paul Knitter.

He died in 1995 at the age of 90, after being hospitalized for three weeks, and was buried at the St. Ignatius Church, Tokyo.

== Legacy ==
According to John Jorgensen Dumoulin was "the foremost exponent of the history of Zen Buddhism to the West". The 1985 double number of the Japanese Journal of Religious Studies was dedicated to him and his work.

== Bibliography ==
- The Development of Chinese Zen After the Sixth Patriarch in the Light of the Mumonkan (1953, First Zen Institute of America)
- A History of Zen Buddhism (1963, Pantheon Books)
- Christianity Meets Buddhism (1974, Open Court Publishing)
- Buddhism in the Modern World (1976, Macmillan Publishing)
- Zen Enlightenment: Origins and Meaning (1979, Weatherhill)
- Zen Buddhism in the Twentieth Century (1992)
- Understanding Buddhism: Key Themes (1994), Weatherhill
- Zen Buddhism: A History; Volume 1 India and China, (2005, World Wisdom) ISBN 978-094153289-1
- Zen Buddhism: A History; Volume 2 Japan, (2005, World Wisdom) ISBN 978-094153290-7
