= RTK =

RTK may refer to:

== Science and technology ==
- Real-time kinematic positioning, a technique for precision satellite navigation
- Receptor tyrosine kinase, high-affinity cell surface receptors

== Other uses ==
- Radio Television of Kosovo, public service broadcaster in Kosovo
- Rentech (NYSE symbol), a former US company
- Right to know, a human right enshrined in law
- Remembering the Kanji (RTK1, RTK2, RTK3), books teaching Japanese Kanji
