= NIRC =

NIRC may refer to:

- National Industrial Relations Court, a British court from 1971 to 1974
- Ner Israel Rabbinical College, a yeshiva in Maryland, United States, which is also called Yeshivas Ner Yisroel
- Nanzan Institute for Religion and Culture, a faculty of Nanzan University, Japan
