= Souls of Zen =

2012 German documentary film

- Release poster
- Directed by: Tim Graf; Jakob Montrasio
- Written by: Tim Graf
- Produced by: Tim Graf; Michael Zimmer
- Cinematography: Jakob Montrasio
- Edited by: Jakob Montrasio; Tim Graf
- Music by: Thomas Henz
- Production companies: m&r Kreativ
- Release date: September 21, 2012 (Zurich Film Festival)
- Running time: 89 minutes
- Country: Germany
- Languages: Japanese; English

Souls of Zen (full title: Souls of Zen: Buddhism, Ancestors, and the 2011 Tsunami in Japan) is a 2012 German documentary film directed by Tim Graf and Jakob Montrasio. It follows Zen Buddhist priests, temple communities and bereaved families in north-eastern Japan in the months after the 2011 Tōhoku earthquake and tsunami, and looks at the role Buddhist funeral and ancestor rites played in coping with the disaster. The film premiered in competition at the 2012 Zurich Film Festival.

== Production ==
Co-director Jakob Montrasio filming at Daiyūzan Saijō-ji temple in 2011

In early 2011, Tim Graf, a doctoral researcher in religious studies from Heidelberg, began fieldwork in Japan on the visual culture of Zen Buddhism, and Montrasio was to film everyday life in Zen temples for the project. The two had originally planned a half-hour film. After the earthquake and tsunami of 11 March 2011, the two abandoned their original plan and instead accompanied Zen priests during relief work in the affected regions. With support from Heidelberg University, they expanded the project into a feature-length documentary. Graf described the Buddhist response, which included collecting donations, turning temples into emergency shelters and performing funeral rites, as the largest religious mobilization in Japan's postwar history.

Among those interviewed are temple priests in Sendai and the religious studies scholar Kimura Toshiaki of Tohoku University; the filmmakers otherwise gave most of the screen time to people affected by the disaster and to Buddhist clergy. One priest describes how, with no coffins available, his temple built its own wooden boxes for the dead.

== Reception ==
Christian Röther of Deutschlandfunk Kultur found that the film showed impressively how Japanese Buddhism dealt with the destruction, and called it informative and worth seeing, although he noted that its occasionally academic language and Buddhist terminology could be hard for lay viewers to follow. He added that it offered a perspective that had been largely missing from German coverage of the disaster, which had focused on nuclear energy. Daniel Wick of OutNow.ch was more critical, writing that the film tried to cover two vast subjects at once, the tsunami and Buddhism, and that despite interesting information and good insights it ultimately stayed on the surface of both.

Reviewing the classroom edition in the journal Asian Ethnology, Benjamin Dorman described the film's account of how Buddhist priests and temples supported survivors and had to adapt funeral and ancestor rites after the disaster. He considered one segment, about a Tokyo temple offering graves to single women and childless couples, to be unrelated to the film's focus on Buddhism's response to the tsunami.

== Release ==
Souls of Zen premiered on 21 September 2012 at the Zurich Film Festival, where it competed for the Golden Eye award. It was subsequently shown at festivals in Warsaw and Singapore and, in January 2013, in the Spektrum section of the 34th Filmfestival Max Ophüls Preis. Its Heidelberg premiere took place in March 2013 at the Heidelberger Kunstverein, as part of a programme commemorating the disaster organised with the German-Japanese Society. A 63-minute classroom edition, Buddhism after the Tsunami: The Souls of Zen 3/11 Japan Special, was later made freely available online.
