= James Heisig =

British philosopher (born 1944)

James Wallace Heisig (born 1944) is an American philosopher who specialises in the field of philosophy of religion. He has published a number of books on topics ranging from the notion of God in analytical psychology, the Kyoto School of Philosophy (including the works of Nishida Kitaro and Tanabe Hajime) to contemporary inter-religious dialogue. His books, translations, and edited collections, which have appeared in 18 languages, currently number 95 volumes. Heisig currently resides in Nagoya, where he continues to conduct research as an emeritus fellow of the Nanzan Institute, to publish books, and lecture in Japan and abroad on philosophy and religion. He is also famous among students of the Japanese and Chinese languages for his Remembering the Kanji and Remembering the Hanzi series.

He served as a lecturer at the Divine Word College (Epworth, Iowa) as a BA student and graduated with a BA degree in philosophy from the same college in 1966. In 1969 he received his master's degree in philosophy from Loyola University Chicago and another in theology from Notre Dame University. After receiving a PhD in Religious studies at Cambridge University in 1973, he went back to Divine Word College to teach philosophy and religion as a lecturer. Between 1974 and 1978, he was a visiting lecturer at Catholic Theological Union, Instituto Superior de Estudios Eclesiásticos (Mexico City), and Old Dominion University (Norfolk, Virginia). In September 1976, he moved to Japan (first to Kamakura and Nagano, and then to the city of Nagoya in Aichi Prefecture) to take up the position of Permanent Research Fellow at the Nanzan Institute for Religion and Culture on the campus of Nanzan University. He served as the director of the Nanzan Institute from 1991 to 2001 following in the footsteps of the former director and Belgian philosopher, Jan Van Bragt. In 2015, Heisig received an honorary doctoral degree from Tallinn University in Estonia and in 2021 was awarded the Kanazawa University International Award in Commemoration of Daisetz T. Suzuki and Kitaro Nishida. In 2023 he was awarded Japan's Order of the Sacred Treasure.

== Bibliography ==
=== Books (author) ===
- El cuento detrás del cuento: un ensayo sobre psique y mito. Introducción de Cecilio de Lora. (Buenos Aires: Editorial Guadalupe, 1976).
- Adventures in Kanji-Land (Nagoya, Nanzan University, 1977).
- Imago Dei: A study of C. G. Jung's psychology of religion (London and Lewisburg: Bucknell University Press, 1979, 1983).
  - Japanese translation:『ユングの宗教心理学』, trans. by 渡辺学 Watanabe Manabu and 纐纈康兵 Kōketsu Kōhei. (Tokyo: Shunjūsha, 1985, 1986). With a new Foreword.
- Remembering the Kanji I: A Complete Course on How Not to Forget the Meaning and Writing of Japanese Characters (Tokyo: Japan Publications Trading Co., 1985; 5th ed.; 24th printing, 2008).
  - 6th edition: (Honolulu: University of Hawai'i Press, 2011; 3rd printing, 2015).
  - French adaptation: Yves Maniette, Les kanjis dans la tête : Apprendre à ne pas oublier le sens et l'écriture des caractères japonais (Gramagraf sccl, 1998). 2nd printing, 2005.
  - Spanish adaptation: (with Marc Bernabé and Verònica Calafell). Kanji para recordar: Curso mnemoténico para el aprendizaje de la escritura y el significado de los characteres japoneses (Barcelona: Editorial Herder, 2001; 2d edition, 3rd printing; 3rd edition, 2014).
  - German adaptation: (with Robert Rauther). Die Kanji lernen und behalten I. Bedeutung und Schreibweise der japanischen Schriftzeichen (Frankfurt am Main: Vittorio Klostermann Verlag, 3rd printing, 2009). neue folge: (Frankfurt am Main: Vittorio Klostermann Verlag, 2012).
  - Dutch adaptation: (with Sarah Van Camp). Kanji. Snel Japan's leren schrijven en onthouden door de kracht van verbeelding (Antwerpen: Garant, 2010).
  - Hungarian adaptation: (with Rácz Zoltán). Megjegyezhető kandzsik, Első kötet. A japán írásjegyek jelentése és írásmódja. (Budapest: Shirokuma, 2011).
  - Polish adaptation: (with Marcin Sudara). Kanji. Kurs skutecznego zapamiętywania znaków japońskich (Poznań: Nowela, 2014).
  - Portuguese adaptation: (with Rafael Shoji). Kanji. Imaginar para aprender. Um Curso Completo para a Memorização da Escrita e Significado dos Caracteres Japoneses (São Paulo: Kasina/Nanzan, 2015).
  - Italian adaptation: (with Anna Ruggeri). Per ricordare i kanji. Corso mnemonico per l'apprendimento veloce di scrittura e signi cato dei caratteri giapponesi (Nagoya: Nanzan, 2015).
  - Hebrew adaptation: (with Erez Volk). קאנג׳י מא׳ ועד ת׳. קורס שלם ללימוד הכתיב והמשמעות של הסימנים היפניים (Rehovot: MeMo, 2020).
- Remembering the Kanji II: A Systematic Guide to Reading Japanese Characters (Tokyo: Japan Publications Trading Co., 1987; 3rd ed.; 13th printing, 2008).
  - 3rd edition: (Honolulu: University of Hawai'i Press, 2008).
  - 4th edition: (Honolulu: University of Hawai'i Press, 2012).
  - Spanish adaptation: (with Marc Bernabé and Verònica Calafell). Kanji para recordar II: Guía sistemática para la lectura de los characteres japoneses (Barcelona: Herder, 2004).
  - German adaptation: (with Robert Rauther). Die Kanji lernen und behalten II. Systematische Anleitung zu den Lesungen der japanischen Schriftzeichen, Neue Folge (Frankfurt am Main: Vittorio Klostermann Verlag, 2006). neue folge: (Frankfurt am Main: Vittorio Klostermann Verlag, 2013).
- Remembering the Hiragana: A Complete Course on How to Teach Yourself the Japanese Syllabary in 3 Hours (Tokyo: Japan Publications Trading Co., 1987; 10th printing, 1999).
- Remembering the Kanji III: Writing and Reading Japanese Characters for Upper-Level Proficiency (Tokyo: Japan Publications Trading Co., 1994; 2nd ed., 3rd printing, 2008). (1st edition co- authored with Tanya Sienko)
  - 2nd edition: (Honolulu: University of Hawai'i Press, 2008).
  - 3rd edition: (Honolulu: University of Hawai'i Press, 2013).
  - German adaptation: (with Robert Rauther). Die Kanji lernen und behalten III: Schriftzeichen für den fortgeschrittenen Gebrauch (Frankfurt: Klostermann Verlag, 2013).
- Remembering the Kana: A Guide to Reading and Writing the Japanese Syllabaries in 3 hours each [Combined edition] (Tokyo: Japan Publications Trading Co., 2001; 2nd ed., 2nd printing, 2005).
  - 3rd edition: (Honolulu: University of Hawai'i Press, 2007; 4th printing, 2015).
  - Spanish adaptation: (with Marc Bernabé and Verònica Calafell). Kana para recordar: Curso mnemoténico para el aprendizaje de los silabarios japoneses (Barcelona: Editorial Herder, 2003; 3rd printing, 2008).
  - German adaptation: (with Klaus Gresbrand). Die Kana lernen und behalten. Die japanische Silbenschrift lesen und schreiben in je drei Stunden (Frankfurt am Main: Vittorio Klostermann Verlag, 2009, 3rd printing).
  - Dutch adaptation: (with Sarah Van Camp). Kana. Snel Japan's leren lezen en schrijven (Antwerpen: Garant, 2009).
- Filósofos de la nada: Un ensayo sobre la escuela de Kioto (Barcelona: Editorial Herder, 2002).
  - English translation: Philosophers of Nothingness: An Essay on the Kyoto School (Honolulu: University of Hawai'i Press, 2001; 2nd printing, 2004).
  - Rumanian translation: (trad. N. I. Maris si Mona Mamulea). Scoala loso ca de la Kyoto (Bucharest: Editura Merc Serv, 2003).
  - Italian translation: (trad. a cura di Enrico Fongaro, Carlo Saviani e Tiziano Tosolini). Filoso del nulla (Palermo: L'Epos, 2007).
  - Bosnian translation: (trad. Nevad Katehran). Filozo ništavila: Esej o Kyoto školi (Sarajevo: Kult-B, 2007), with a new Preface (13–19).
  - French translation: (trans. Bernard Stevens, Jacynthe Tremblay, Sylvain Isaac). Les philosophes du néant: Un essai sur l'école de Kyoto (Paris: "Éditions du Cerf, 2008).
- Dialogues at One Inch Above the Ground: Reclamations of Belief in an Interreligious Age (New York: Crossroad, 2003).
  - Rumanian translation: (trad. N. I. Maris si Mona Mamulea). Dialoguri la câtiva centimetri deasupra pamântului: Revendicarile credintei într-o epoca interreligioasa (Bucharest: Editura Merc Serv, 2003).
  - Portuguese translation: (trad. de Maria Cecilia Campello). Diálogos a uma polegada acima da terra: Recuperação da fé num mundo inter-religioso (Rio de Janeiro: Edição Loyola, 2004).
  - Spanish translation: (trad. de Raquel Bouso García). Diálogos a una pulgada del suelo: recuperar las creencias en una época interreligiosa (Barcelona: Herder Editorial, 2004).
- El gemelo de Jesús: Un alumbramiento al budismo. (Barcelona: Herder Editorial, 2007).
  - Italian translation: (trad. a cura di Carlo Saviani). Il gemello di Gesù: Commento al Vangelo di Tommaso (Napoli: Il Pozzo di Giacobbe, 2007).
  - English translation: Jesus' Twin: A Commentary on the Gospel of Thomas (New York: Crossroad, 2015).
- Nothingness and Desire: An East-West Philosophical Antiphony (Honolulu: University of Hawai'i Press, June 2013).
  - Italian translation: (trad. a cura di Carlo Saviani). Il nulla e il desiderio (Milano: Mimesis, 2014).
- Much Ado about Nothingness: Essays on Nishida and Tanabe (Nagoya: Nanzan, 2015).
- Of Gods and Minds: In Search of a Theological Commons (Nagoya: Chisokudō Publications, 2019).
  - Italian translation: (trad. a cura di Carlo Saviani). Gli dei e la mente. Alla ricerca di risorse comuni teologiche (Nagoya: Chisokudō Publications, 2020).
- In Praise of Civility [Eugene, or: Wipf and Stock, 2022), 130 pages.
  - Spanish translation: En busca de la bondad colectiva: Elogio de la civilidad (Barcelona: Herder Editorial, 2023).

=== Books (editor) ===
- Japanese Philosophy Abroad (Nagoya: Nanzan Institute for Religion and Culture, 2004).
  - Bosnian translation (partial): Dialog: Časopis za filozofska i društvena pitanja (Saravejo), 2006/3–4: 117–158.
  - Japanese translation:『日本哲学の国際性―海外における受容と展望』(Kyoto: Sekaishisōsha, 2006).
- Frontiers of Japanese Philosophy (Nagoya: Nanzan Institute for Religion and Culture, 2006).

=== Books (co-author, co-editor) ===
- (with 村上兵衛 Murakami Hyōei, 羽澄英治 Hazumi Eiji, and 伊藤一男 Itō Kazuo),『米大陸における日本 文化の普及方法の研究』[Methods of disseminating Japanese culture in the Americas] (Tokyo: NIRA Output, 1981).
- (with Helmut Morsbach and Kurebayashi Kazue), Remembering the Katakana, with a supplement on Learning How to Remember (Tokyo: Japan Publication Trading Co., 1990). 5th printing, 1996.
- (with Timothy W. Richardson). Remembering Traditional Hanzi: How Not to Forget the Meaning and Writing of Chinese Characters, Book 1 (Honolulu: University of Hawai'i Press, 2008).
- (with Timothy W. Richardson). Remembering Simplified Hanzi: How Not to Forget the Meaning and Writing of Chinese Characters, Book 1 (Honolulu: University of Hawai'i Press, 2008).
- (with Timothy W. Richardson and Robert Raucher). Vereinfachte Hanzi lernen und behalten. Bedeutung und Schreibweise der häu gsten chinesischen Schrei zeichen (Frankfurt: Klostermann Verlag, 2009).
- (with Timothy W. Richardson, Marc Bernabé and Verònica Calafell). Hanzi para recordar. Chino simplificado, Libro 1 (Barcelona: Herder Editorial, 2009).
- (with Timothy W. Richardson, Marc Bernabé and Verònica Calafell). Hanzi para recordar. Chino tradicional, Libro 1 (Barcelona: Herder Editorial, 2009).
- (with Timothy W. Richardson and Robert Raucher). Traditionelle Hanzi lernen und behalten. Bedeutung und Schreibweise der häu gsten chinesischen Schrei Zeichen (Frankfurt: Klostermann Verlag, 2010).
- (with Timothy W. Richardson). Remembering Traditional Hanzi: How Not to Forget the Meaning and Writing of Chinese Characters, Book 2 (Honolulu: University of Hawai'i Press, 2012).
- (with Timothy W. Richardson). Remembering Simplified Hanzi: How Not to Forget the Meaning and Writing of Chinese Characters, Book 2 (Honolulu: University of Hawai'i Press, 2012).
- (with Marcin Sudara). Kanji – Tom 1: Kurs skutecznego zapamiętywania znaków japońskich (Poznań: Nowela, 2014).
- (with Timothy W. Richardson, Marc Bernabé and Verònica Calafell). Hanzi para recordar. Chino simplificado, Libro 2 (Barcelona: Herder Editorial, 2014).
- (with Timothy W. Richardson, Marc Bernabé and Verònica Calafell). Hanzi para recordar. Chino tradicional, Libro 2 (Barcelona: Herder Editorial, 2014).
- (with Minoru Kiyota, Byron Earhart, and Paul Griffiths) Japanese Buddhism: Its Tradition, New Religions, and Interaction with Christianity (Tokyo: Buddhist Books International, 1987).
- (with Taitetsu Unno), The Religious Philosophy of Tanabe Hajime: The Metanoetic Imperative (Berkeley: Asian Humanities Press, 1990).
- Buddhist Spirituality'. Volume 1: Indian, Southeast Asian, Tibetan, Early Chinese. Ed. by Takeuchi Yoshinori with James W. Heisig, Joseph S. O'Leary, Paul L. Swanson and Jan Van Bragt (New York: Crossroad, 1993).
  - Portuguese translation: A Espiritualidade Budhista: Índia, Sudeste Asiático, Tibete e China Primitiva (São Paulo: Perspectiva, 2006).
- (with John C. Maraldo). Rude Awakenings: Zen, the Kyoto School, and the Question of Nationalism (Honolulu: University of Hawai'i Press, 1995).
- Buddhist Spirituality. Volume 2: Later China, Korea, Japan, and the Modern World. Ed. by Takeuchi Yoshinori with James W. Heisig, Joseph S. O'Leary, and Paul L. Swanson (New York: Crossroad, 1999).
- (with Edmund Chia). A Longing for Peace: The Challenge of a Multicultural, Multireligious World. (Bilbao, 2006).
- (with Sung Hae Kim). Monasticism Buddhist and Christian: The Korean Experience. (Leuven: Peeters, 2008).
- (with Uehara Mayuko). Frontiers of Japanese Philosophy 3: Origins and Possibilities. (Nagoya: Nanzan Institute for Religion and Culture, 2008).
- (with Sung Hae Kim). Encounters: The New Religions of Korea and Christianity. (Seoul: The Royal Asiatic Society, 2008).
- (with Nevad Kahteran). Frontiers of Japanese Philosophy 5: Nove granice japanske filozofije (Sarajevo- Nagoya: Nanzan Institut za religiju i kulturu i BTC Šahinpašić, 2009).
- (with Raquel Bouso). Frontiers of Japanese Philosophy 6: Con uences and Cross-Currents (Nagoya: Nanzan Institute for Religion and Culture, 2009).
- (with Rein Raud). Frontiers of Japanese Philosophy 7: Classical Japanese Philosophy (Nagoya: Nanzan Institute for Religion and Culture, 2010).
- (with Thomas P. Kasulis and John C. Maraldo). Japanese Philosophy: A Sourcebook (Honolulu: University of Hawai'i Press, 2011). Translations in Spanish, Korean, and Chinese.
- (with Seung Chul Kim). Jan Van Bragt, Interreligious Affinities: Encounters with the Kyoto School and the Religions of Japan (Nagoya: Nanzan Institute for Religion & Culture, 2014).
- (with Raquel Bouso, Thomas P. Kasulis and John C. Maraldo). La filosofía japonesa en sus textos (Barcelona: Herder Editorial, 2016).

=== Books (translator) ===
- (from German) Hans Waldenfels, Absolute Nothingness: Foundations for a Buddhist-Christian Dialogue (New York: Paulist, 1980).
- (from Japanese) Murakami Hyōei, Itō Kazuo, Hazumi Eiji, and James W. Heisig, Japanese Culture in America: An Investigation into Methods of its Dissemination (Tokyo: Japan Culture Institute, 1982).
- (from Japanese) Takeuchi Yoshinori, The Heart of Buddhism: In Search of the Timeless Spirit of Primitive Buddhism (New York: Crossroad, 1983).
  - Italian translation: Il cuore del Buddhismo: Alla ricerca dei valori originari e perenni del Buddhismo. Trans. by Maria De Giorgi. (Bologna: Editrice Missionaria Italiana, 1999).
- (from Spanish) Amador Vega, Ramon Llull and the Secret of Life (New York: Crossroad, 2003).
- (from Japanese) Kagawa Toyohiko, Cosmic Purpose (Eugene, or: Casade Books, 2014).

=== Books (co-translator) ===
- (from Japanese, with Takeuchi Yoshinori and Valdo Viglielmo). Tanabe Hajime, Philosophy as Metanoetics (Berkeley: University of California Press, 1986).
- (from German, with Paul Knitter). Heinrich Dumoulin, Zen Buddhism: A History. Vol. 1, India and China (New York, Macmillan, 1988; 2nd edition, 1994).
- (from German, with Paul Knitter). Heinrich Dumoulin Zen Buddhism: A History. Vol. 2, Japan (New York: Macmillan, 1989).
- (from Japanese, with Paul Swanson). Akizuki Ryōmin, New Mahāyāna: Buddhism for a Post-Modern World (Berkeley: Asian Humanities Press, 1990).
- (from Japanese, with Yamamoto Seisaku). Nishitani Keiji, Nishida Kitarō (Berkeley: University of California Press, 1991).
- (from German), with 華園聰麿 Hanazono Toshimaro and 日野紹運 Hino Shōun R. オットー,『東と西の 神秘主: エックハルトとシャンカラ』[Rudolf Otto, Öst-Westliche Mystik] (Kyoto: Jinbun Shoin, 1993). Recipient of the 1993 Japanese Cultural Translation Prize. 1993 年日本翻訳文化賞受賞.
- (from Japanese, translation consultant). Tezuka Osamu, Buda. Trans. by Marc Bernabé (Barcelona: Planeta de Agostini, 2002–2003 ). Vols. 1–5.

=== Edited Collections ===
- Editor: Verbum 19/1–2 (1978).
- Editor: A Tribute to Heinrich Dumoulin, special issue of the Japanese Journal of Religious Studies 12/2–3 (1985): 109–271.
- General editor: Nanzan Studies in Religion and Culture (1980–), 19 vols.
- Co-editor: Nanzan Library of Asian Religions and Cultures (1997– ), 13 vols.
- Co-editor with Kim Sung-Hae, special edition of Studies in Inter-Religious Dialogue 14/1 (2004).
- Co-direttore con Carlo Saviani: Tetsugaku –Studi e testi di loso giapponesi. L'Epos, Palermo. (2004– ). 5 vols.
- Editor: Frontiers of Japanese Philosophy (2006– ), 10 vols.
