= Religion and Nothingness =

1961 book by Keiji Nishitani

- Cover of the English translation
- Author: Keiji Nishitani
- Original title: 宗教とは何か (Shūkyō to wa Nanika), "What is religion?"
- Translator: Jan Van Bragt
- Language: Japanese
- Subject: Nihilism
- Published: 1961 (in Japanese); 1982 (in English)
- Publication place: Japan
- Media type: Print (Hardcover and Paperback)
- Pages: 366 (English translation)
- ISBN: 978-0520049468

Religion and Nothingness (Japanese: Shūkyō to wa Nanika; the original title translates literally as "What is Religion?") is a 1961 book about nihilism by the Japanese philosopher Keiji Nishitani. The book was published in English translation in 1982, and received positive reviews, commending Nishitani for his understanding of both Western and Eastern philosophy. The appearance of the English translation increased interest in Nishitani's ideas among philosophers.

== Publication history ==
The English translation of Religion and Nothingness, by the philosopher Jan Van Bragt, was first published in 1982 by University of California Press.

== Reception ==
According to Ruben L. F. Habito, the appearance of Religion and Nothingness in English translation in 1982 led to increasing interest in Nishitani's ideas among philosophers, theologians, and religious scholars. Graham Parkes described the book as Nishitani's masterwork, writing that in it Nishitani achieved a philosophical synthesis that matches the achievements of the philosophers Søren Kierkegaard, Friedrich Nietzsche, and Martin Heidegger in depth of insight.

The book received positive reviews from Donald L. Smith in Library Journal and J. N. Gray in The Times Literary Supplement.

Smith wrote that Nishitani "presents a subtle philosophical analysis of reality and a lively argument for resolving problems of being in terms of certain metaphysical principles of Zen Buddhism." Smith called the book "profound yet clearly written", and credited Nishitani with "erudite wisdom and understanding of both Eastern and Western philosophical traditions." Gray wrote that Nishitani "achieves a remarkable cross-fertilization of the most profound and radical elements in Eastern and Western philosophy and spiritual experience", and that the book "will have the utmost value for all those who see in contemporary Western philosophy the unresolved issue of nihilism, and who are prepared to entertain the supposition that thought emerging from a tradition in which the experience of Nothingness was not threatening, and rather a benediction, may have something to teach us."

The book was also reviewed by Philip Blosser in Research in Phenomenology, the theologian Thomas J. J. Altizer in Journal of the American Academy of Religion, the Buddhist studies scholar Bernard Faure in The Journal of Asian Studies, Thomas P. Kasulis in The Journal of Religion, and Richard H. Drummond in Journal of Ecumenical Studies. James L. Fredericks wrote in The Journal of Religion that Religion and Nothingness appeals to "a broad theologically or philosophically oriented readership."
