= Japanese Journal of Religious Studies =

- Discipline: Religion in Japan
- Language: English
- Edited by: Paul L. Swanson, Benjamin Dorman

Publication details
- Former name: Contemporary Religions in Japan
- History: 1960-present
- Publisher: Nanzan Institute for Religion and Culture (Japan)
- Frequency: Biannual
- Open access: Yes

Standard abbreviations
- ISO 4: Jpn. J. Relig. Stud.

Indexing
- ISSN: 0304-1042
- LCCN: 74647823
- JSTOR: 03041042
- OCLC no.: 715957722

Links
- Journal homepage; Online access; Contemporary Religions in Japan archive

The Japanese Journal of Religious Studies is a biannual open access journal of research on religion in Japan. It was established in 1960 as Contemporary Religions in Japan by the International Institute for the Study of Religions in Tokyo and published until 1970. It was revived under its current name in 1974 and has since been published by the Nanzan Institute for Religion and Culture since 1981.

== See also ==
- Asian Ethnology
