= Nanzan Institute for Religion and Culture =

The Nanzan Institute for Religion and Culture (南山宗教文化研究所, Nanzan shūkyō bunka kenkyujo) is one of the largest centers in the world devoted to scholarly research on the interface of philosophy and religions within the East and West. Founded in 1976 on the campus of Nanzan University, it has established itself in Japan and around the world as a center of academic excellence through its publications, conferences, and team of permanent researchers.

== History ==
The Institute's founder and first director was the Jesuit theologian Heinrich Dumoulin, followed by the Belgian philosopher Jan Van Bragt. After Van Bragt, from 1991 to 2001, the director was James Heisig.

== Structure ==
The staff is made up of a group of 5 Permanent Research Fellows who belong nominally to the faculty of Arts and Letters of Nanzan University but who are relieved of most teaching and committee obligations in order to focus on the specific work of the Institute. A clerical staff of 2 full-time and 3 part-time secretaries take care of maintaining the library, distribution of journals, and other clerical tasks associated with the work of the research staff.
In addition, since the beginning post-doctoral scholarships have been offered to promising young scholars in Japan to spend two years at the Institute sharing in its activities and making their own contribution to its ever-growing range of interests. During a period of twenty years, from 1983 to 2002, visiting fellowships were also provided for scholars from Eastern Asia to spend a year at the Institute. Finally, there has been a steady stream of scholars from around the world spending longer or shorter periods of time on a particular project related to the aims of the Institute.
A non-lending, specialized research library divided among the three floors and full basement includes some 35,000 titles, together with over 260 periodical journals. In addition to office space, the facilities also include 16 research offices, a reading room, 4 meeting rooms, and ample-size reading rooms. Also associated with the Institute is a nearby residence, the Paulus Heim, where Institute staff and its visitors share a common table and life together.

== Conferences ==
Although no formal courses are held at the Institute, academic discussions of several sorts—colloquia, research meetings with local scholars, in-house seminars, reading groups for the public at large, and special guest lectures—are held regularly.
Every second year since its founding a major symposium has been held, usually bringing representatives of specific religious or philosophical persuasions into dialogue.

== Publications ==
The Institute staff publish the Japanese Journal of Religious Studies, the leading English-language source for current research in the field of Japanese Religions, and Asian Ethnology (formerly Asian Folklore Studies), which includes scholarship from the Indian sub-continent to all of Eastern Asia.

Other journals edited and published at the Institute include:

- Journal of the Japan Society for Buddhist-Christian Studies (東西宗教研究, Tōzai shūkyō kenyū)
- Inter-Religio (1982–2005)

and annual Bulletins in English:

- The Japan Christian Review (1992-1998)
- Bulletin of the Nanzan Institute for Religion & Culture (every Spring)

and Japanese:

- Bulletin
- Journal of the Japan Society for Buddhist-Christian Studies annual proceedings

All of these journals, and all of their back numbers, have been available on the internet, and in searchable form, free of charge since the early 1990s.

In addition to private publications of the research staff, the more than 60 volumes of published research edited by the Institute include 2 series in Japanese:

- the semi-annual symposia
- a Series of scholarly monographs

three series in English:

- Nanzan Studies in Religion and Culture
- Nanzan Studies in Asian Religions
- Nanzan Library of Asian Religion and Culture

and a series in Italian entitled Tetsugaku.

Its books have also been translated into Portuguese, Bosnian, Rumanian, Italian, and Spanish, and have earned a number of publishing awards.

== Funded projects ==
In 2005, Robert Roche, president of Oaklawn Marketing in Japan, endowed a $1 million chair for “Interreligious Research.” Among the many funded projects of recent years, the Nanzan Institute engaged with the Templeton Foundation project on Affirming Science and Religion in the Japanese Context published in 2009 in the book Global Perspectives on Science and Spirituality and a Japan Society for the Promotion of Science project aimed at producing a Sourcebook in Japanese Philosophy.
