= Remembering the Kanji =

Japanese language three volume series by James Heisig

Remembering the Kanji 1
- Cover of the 5th Edition
- Author: James W. Heisig
- Language: English, with translations into Dutch, French, Spanish, Polish, Portuguese, German, Italian, Hungarian, Swedish and Hebrew.
- Series: Remembering the Kanji
- Publisher: University of Hawai'i Press
- Publication date: Sixth Edition: 3rd printing, 2015. Fifth Edition: 2008
- Publication place: United States
- Pages: 484 (6th edition)
- ISBN: 978-0-8248-3592-7

Remembering the Kanji is a series of three volumes by James Heisig, intended to teach the 3,000 most frequent Kanji to students of the Japanese language. The series is available in English, French, German, Dutch, Spanish, Polish, Portuguese, Hungarian, Italian, Swedish, and Hebrew. There is a supplementary book, Remembering the Kana, which teaches the Japanese syllabaries (hiragana and katakana). Remembering the Hanzi, by the same author, is intended to teach the 3,000 most frequent Hanzi to students of the Chinese language. This book has two variants: Remembering Simplified Hanzi and Remembering Traditional Hanzi, each in two volumes.

== Characteristics ==
=== Methodology ===
The method differs markedly from traditional rote-memorization techniques practiced in most courses. The course teaches the student to utilize all the constituent parts of a kanji's written form—termed "primitives", combined with a mnemonic device that Heisig refers to as "imaginative memory". Each kanji (and each non-kanji primitive) is assigned a unique keyword. A kanji's written form and its keyword are associated by imagining a scene or story connecting the meaning of the given kanji with the meanings of all the primitives used to write that kanji. The method requires the student to invent their own stories to associate the keyword meaning with the written form. The text presents detailed stories in Part I, proceeding through Part II with less verbose stories. This is to encourage the student to use the stories as practice for creating their own. After the 547 kanji in Parts I and II, the remainder of the kanji in Part III have the component keywords but no stories. However, in cases where the reader may be easily confused or for difficult kanji, Heisig often provides a small story or hint.

All the kanji are analyzed by components—Heisig terms these "primitives"—which may be traditional radicals, other kanji themselves, or a collection of strokes not normally identified as independent entities. The basic primitives are introduced as needed throughout the book. This order is designed to introduce the kanji efficiently by building upon the primitives and kanji already learned, rather than learning the kanji based on the order of their frequency or the dictates of the jōyō kanji grading system. In volume 2, Heisig groups roughly half the kanji according to "signal primitives" that signal a certain Chinese reading (cf radical). There will be one or more exceptions to this rule. These are presented by Heisig in an increasing order of difficulty. The remainder of the Chinese readings are introduced in separate chapters, designed to help the student learn the readings from everyday words and useful compounds.

== Volumes ==
=== Volume 1 ===
The first book in the series, commonly known as RTK1, was originally published in 1977. The sixth edition of the book was released in 2011. In the book, Heisig presents a method for learning how to associate the meaning and writing of 2,200 kanji, including most of the jōyō kanji, as well as some additional kanji. There is no attention given to the readings of the kanji as Heisig believes that one should learn the writing and meaning first before moving on to the readings in Volume II.

==== Sixth Edition ====
A sixth edition was released in April 2011. The sixth edition includes corrections for all errata from prior editions, as well as additional kanji from the 2010 significant revision to the Jōyō kanji. The additional kanji in the sixth edition have also been made into a supplement for older editions. Likewise, RTK2 and RTK3 have been updated in 2012 to reflect these changes.

=== Volume 2 ===
Remembering the Kanji 2
- Author: James W. Heisig
- Language: English, with translations into Spanish and German.
- Series: Remembering the Kanji
- Publisher: University of Hawai'i Press
- Publication date: Fourth Edition: 1st printing, April 2012. Third Edition: 13th printing, 2008
- Publication place: United States
- Pages: 405 (4th edition)
- ISBN: 978-0-8248-3669-6

The second book in the series, often referred to as RTK2, is the second in the Remembering the Kanji. Volume II presents the official readings of the kanji introduced in Volume I.

==== Differences from Volume I ====
Unlike the first volume, this book does not rely on "imaginative memory". The book is mainly focused on the Chinese readings, however one chapter does suggest a mnemonic device for learning the Japanese readings. Heisig splits the kanji into various chapters, according to the most appropriate method to learn their readings. For each Chinese reading of a kanji, an example compound word is given.

=== Volume 3 ===
Remembering the Kanji 3
- Author: James W. Heisig
- Language: English
- Series: Remembering the Kanji
- Publisher: University of Hawai'i Press
- Publication date: Third edition: 1st printing, 2012. Second edition: 2nd printing, 2008
- Publication place: United States
- Pages: 360 pages (3rd edition)
- ISBN: 978-0-8248-3702-0

The third book, commonly referred to as RTK3, is the third in the Remembering the Kanji book series by James Heisig. This volume was co-authored by Tanya Sienko.

Volume 3 presents a further 800 kanji in addition to the 2,200 kanji introduced in Volume 1 and Volume 2. It is split into two parts. The first part is in the style of Volume I, where the writing and keywords are learned. The majority of the new kanji are introduced according to their traditional radical. The other part is in a similar style to Volume 2, where the readings of the kanji are learned.

=== Remembering the Kana ===
Remembering the Kana: A Guide to Reading and Writing the Japanese Syllabaries in 3 hours each is a book by James Heisig for remembering hiragana and katakana. It uses mostly the same imaginative memory technique as Remembering the Kanji I, though some katakana are prompted to be learned as simplified forms of their hiragana counterparts.

Remembering the Kana succeeds the book Remembering the Hiragana: A Complete Course on How to Teach Yourself the Japanese Syllabary in 3 Hours, which only taught the hiragana (and not the katakana).

=== Remembering the Hanzi ===
Heisig and Timothy Richardson have also written Remembering Simplified Hanzi 1 and Remembering Traditional Hanzi 1, which apply the same method to Chinese. Volume 2 of each book was published in 2012.
