= Jan Van Bragt =

Belgian Japanese scholar (1928–2007)

Jan Van Bragt (1928–2007) was a scholar of Japanese religion and philosophy at the Nanzan Institute for Religion and Culture in Nagoya, Japan, where he served as its first acting director in 1976.

== Biography ==
Born in 1928 in Sint-Antonius-Brecht, Flanders, Belgium, Van Bragt joined the Congregation of the Immaculate Heart of Mary at the age of 18, was ordained a priest in 1952, then earned a master's degree from the Congregation's seminary, where he taught philosophy while doing doctoral research on Hegel at the University of Leuven, which awarded him a doctorate in 1961 with the dissertation "De jonge Hegel en Das Leben". He left right away for Japan, where he spent 18 months learning the language and another 18 months as an assistant pastor at Sakai Catholic Church near Osaka before beginning further academic work at Kyoto University.

He had earlier studied at Kyoto University (1965–1971), and later translated into English one of the master works of Kyoto School philosopher Nishitani Keiji, Religion and Nothingness (University of California Press, 1983). He was also a key member of the Japan Society for Buddhist-Christian Studies, serving as its president from 1989 to 1997.
