= An Inquiry into the Good =

1911 book by Kitaro Nishida

- Cover of an English translation
- Author: Kitarō Nishida
- Original title: Zen no Kenkyū
- Language: Japanese
- Subject: Ethics
- Published: 1911 (First edition); 1960 (English translation)
- Publisher: Kōdōkan (1911); Iwanami Shoten (1921, 1936 and thereafter)
- Publication place: Japan
- Media type: Print
- ISBN: 978-0300052336

An Inquiry into the Good, also known as A Study of Good (Japanese: 善の研究), is the first book by the Japanese philosopher Nishida Kitarō, published in 1911.

As he explains in the Preface to the work, Parts II and III were composed first, followed by Parts I and IV. Part I is an explication of the nature of what he calls ‘pure experience’ which lies at the basis of his thought. Part II is the expression of his philosophical thought and is the core part of this book. Then, with the foundation being thus laid, Nishida launches into a discussion of the good in Part III. He appended Part IV out of his belief that the end of philosophy is religion. The reason that he entitled this work An Inquiry into the Good, despite half of it being devoted to the discussion of technical points in philosophy, is because he thought that, ultimately, the central focus of this work is the great questions of human life and existence.

== Table of contents ==
- Part I: Pure Experience [純粋経験]

- Chapter 1: Pure Experience [純粋経験]
- Chapter 2: Thought [思惟]
- Chapter 3: Will [意志]
- Chapter 4: Intellectual Intuition [知的直観]

- Part II: Reality [実在]

- Chapter 1: The Point of Departure for Our Enquiry [考究の出立点]
- Chapter 2: The Phenomena of Consciousness Are the One Reality [意識現象が唯一の実在である]
- Chapter 3: The True Nature of Reality [実在の真景]
- Chapter 4: The True Reality Always Has the Same Form [真実在は常に同一の形式をもっている]
- Chapter 5: The Fundamental Formula of the True Reality [真実在の根本的方式]
- Chapter 6: The One Reality [唯一実在]
- Chapter 7: The Development of Reality by Differentiation [実在の分化発展]
- Chapter 8: Nature [自然]
- Chapter 9: Spirit [精神]
- Chapter 10: God as Reality [実在としての神]

- Part III: The Good [善]

- Chapter 1: Action (Part 1) [行為 上]
- Chapter 2: Action (Part 2) [行為 下]
- Chapter 3: The Freedom of the Will [意志の自由]
- Chapter 4: An Enquiry into Values [価値的研究]
- Chapter 5: Theories of Ethics (Part 1) [倫理学の諸説 其一]
- Chapter 6: Theories of Ethics (Part 2) [倫理学の諸説 其二]
- Chapter 7: Theories of Ethics (Part 3) [倫理学の諸説 其三]
- Chapter 8: Theories of Ethics (Part 4) [倫理学の諸説 其四]
- Chapter 9: The Good (The Action Theory) [善 (活動説)]
- Chapter 10: The Good of Personality [人格的善]
- Chapter 11: The Motivation of Good Action (The Form of the Good) [善行為の動機 (善の形式)]
- Chapter 12: The End of Good Action (The Content of the Good) [善行為の目的 (善の内容)]
- Chapter 13: The Perfect Good Act [完全なる善行]

- Part IV: Religion [宗教]

- Chapter 1: The Religious Demand [宗教の本質]
- Chapter 2: God [神]
- Chapter 3: God and the World [神と世界]
- Chapter 4: Knowledge and Love [知と愛]

== Influence and reception ==
Graham Parkes described An Inquiry into the Good as a "masterpiece". He wrote that was made possible by the Japanese interest in western philosophy that began with the Meiji Restoration of 1868. He considered the book "path-breaking" and identified it as Nishida's best-known accomplishment.

The religious studies scholar Ninian Smart stated that An Inquiry into the Good "struck many readers as the first truly creative work by a Japanese that did not merely repeat western ideas, and yet made use of modern thinking and terminology." However, he added that the work was criticized by the philosopher Takahashi Satomi, who found the subjectivism of "pure experience" too psychological.
