= Kitarō Nishida =

Japanese philosopher

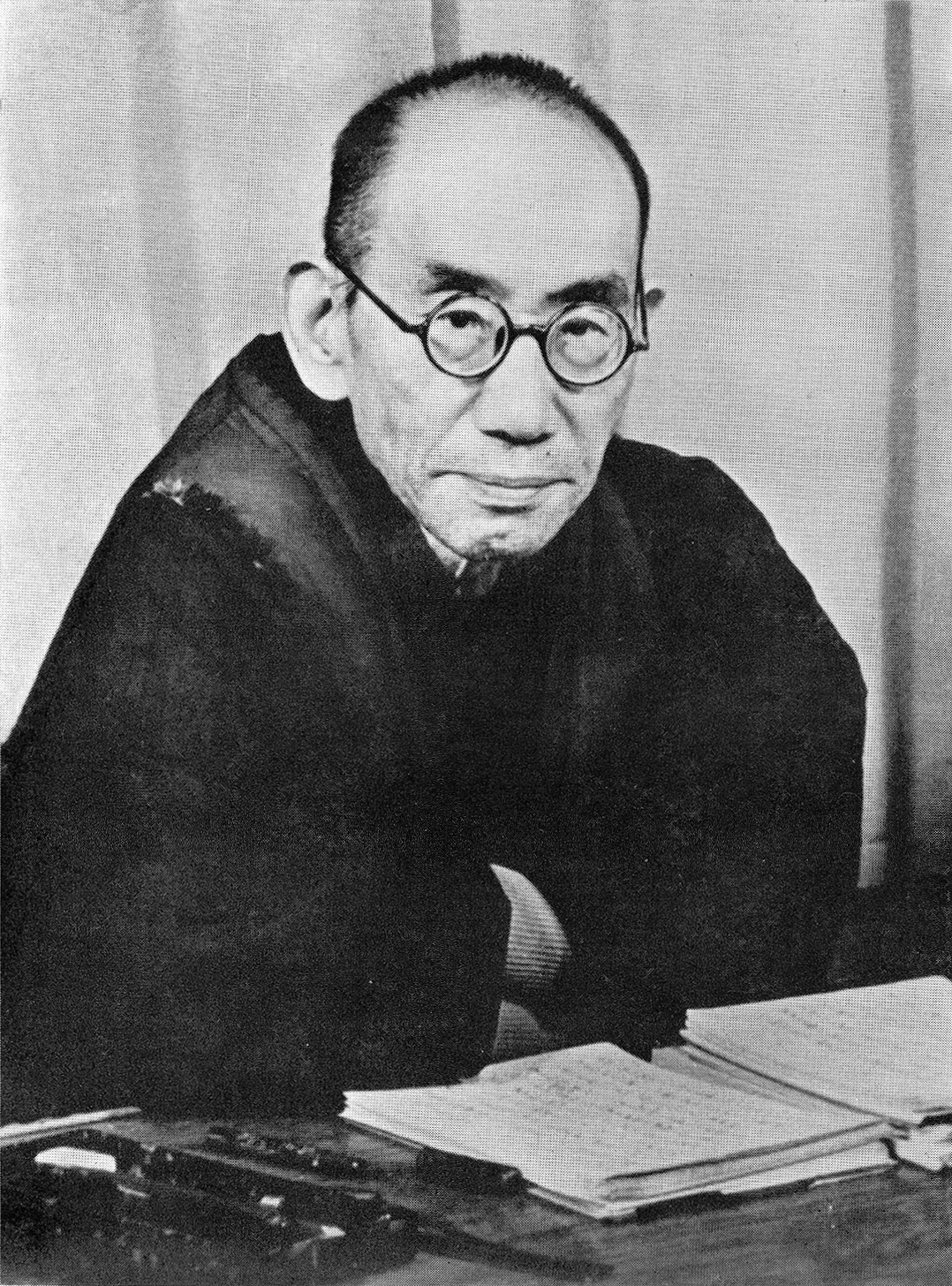
- Born: May 19, 1870; Unokema, Ishikawa, Japan
- Died: June 7, 1945 (aged 75); Kamakura, Kanagawa, Japan

Education
- Education: Tokyo Imperial University

Philosophical work
- Era: 20th-century philosophy
- Region: Japanese philosophy
- School: Kyoto School
- Institutions: Kyoto Imperial University
- Main interests: Metaphysics, aesthetics
- Notable ideas: Logic of basho; absolute nothingness

Kitarō Nishida (西田 幾多郎, Nishida Kitarō; May 19, 1870 – June 7, 1945) was a Japanese moral philosopher, philosopher of mathematics and science, and religious scholar. He was the founder of what has been called the Kyoto School of philosophy. He graduated from the University of Tokyo during the Meiji period in 1894 with a degree in philosophy. He was named professor of the Fourth Higher School in Ishikawa Prefecture in 1899 and later became professor of philosophy at Kyoto University. Nishida retired in 1927. In 1940, he was awarded the Order of Culture (文化勲章, bunka kunshō). He participated in establishing the Chiba Institute of Technology (千葉工業大学) from 1940.

Nishida Kitarō died at the age of 75 of a renal infection. His cremated remains were divided up and interred at different locations. Part of his remains are interred in the Nishida family grave in his birthplace of Unoke, Ishikawa. A second grave can be found at Tōkei-ji Temple in Kamakura, where his friend D. T. Suzuki organized Nishida's funeral and was later interred in the adjacent plot. Nishida's third grave is at Reiun'in (霊雲院, Reiun'in), a temple in the Myōshin-ji compound in Kyoto.

== Philosophy ==
Being born in the third year of the Meiji period, Nishida was presented with a new, unique opportunity to contemplate Eastern philosophical issues in the fresh light that Western philosophy shone on them. Nishida's original and creative philosophy, incorporating ideas of Zen and Western philosophy, was aimed at bringing the East and West closer. Throughout his lifetime, Nishida published a number of books and essays including An Inquiry into the Good and The Logic of the Place of Nothingness and the Religious Worldview. Taken as a whole, Nishida's life work was the foundation for the Kyoto School of philosophy and the inspiration for the original thinking of his disciples.

One of the most famous concepts in Nishida's philosophy is the logic of basho (Japanese: 場所; usually translated as "place" or "topos"), a non-dualistic concrete logic, meant to overcome the inadequacy of the subject-object distinction essential to the subject logic of Aristotle and the predicate logic of Immanuel Kant, through the affirmation of what he calls the "absolutely contradictory self-identity", a dynamic tension of opposites that, unlike the dialectical logic of G.W.F. Hegel, does not resolve in a synthesis. Rather, it defines its proper subject by maintaining the tension between affirmation and negation as opposite poles or perspectives.

In David A. Dilworth's survey of Nishida's works, he did not mention the debut book, An Inquiry into the Good. There, Nishida writes about experience, reality, good and religion. He argues that the most profound form of experience is the pure experience. Nishida analyzes the thought, the will, the intellectual intuition, and the pure experience among them. According to Nishida's vision as well as to the essence of Asian wisdom, one craves harmony in experience, for unity.

== Legacy ==
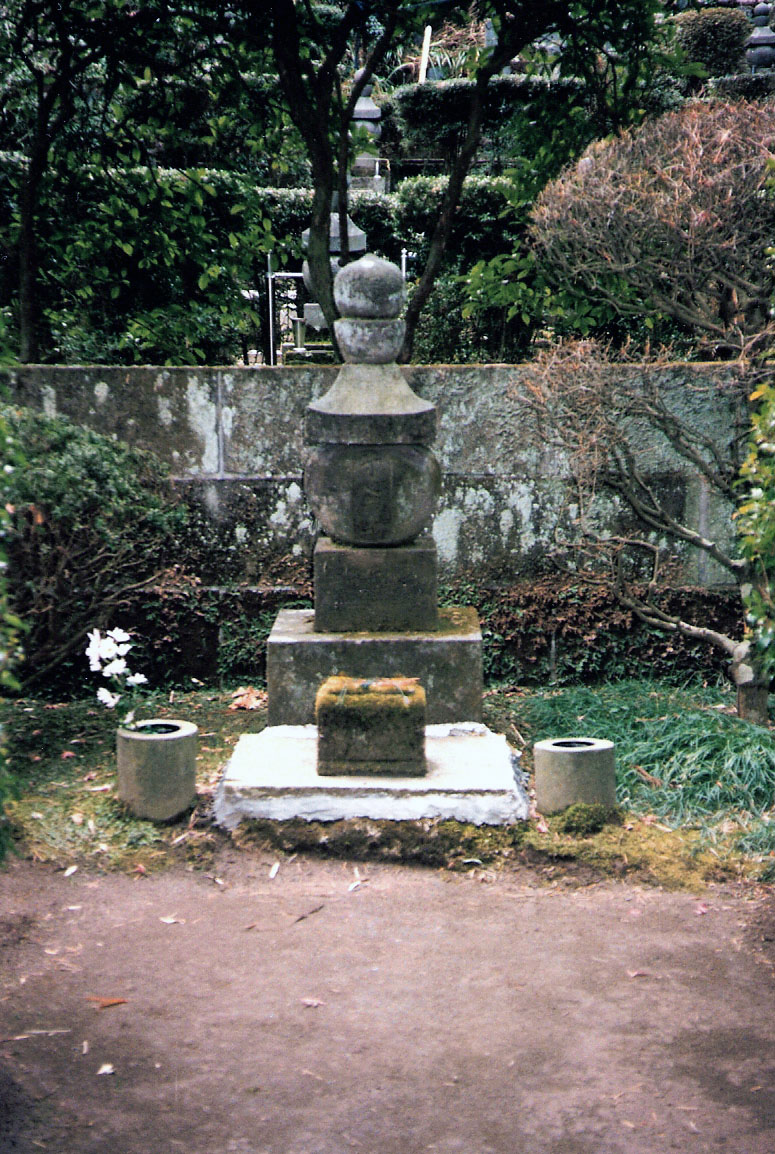
Tomb of Nishida Kitarō in Kamakura

According to Masao Abe, "During World War II right-wing thinkers attacked him as antinationalistic for his appreciation of Western philosophy and logic. But after the war left-wing thinkers criticized his philosophy as nationalistic because of his emphasis on the traditional notion of nothingness. He recognized a kind of universality in Western philosophy and logic but did not accept that it was the only universality."

Nishida considered God "indispensable and decisive".

== List of works ==
Collected Works [西田幾多郎全集], 2nd ed. (Iwanami Shoten [岩波書店], 2003–20), 25 Vols. [hereafter NKZ]

Selected Philosophical Essays [西田幾多郎哲学論集], (Iwanami Shoten [岩波書店], 1987–89), 3 Vols. [hereafter SPE]

- An Inquiry into the Good [善の研究] (Kōdōkan [弘道館], January 1911), reprinted in NKZ1.
- Thoughts and Experiences, Vol. 1 [思索と体験] (Senshōkan [千章館], March 1915), reprinted in NKZ1.

- 'On the Claims of Pure Logicists in Epistemology' [認識論における純論理派の主張について] (Geibun [芸文], Vol. 2, No. 8 and No. 9, August–September 1911).
- 'Laws' [法則] (Tetsugaku Zasshi [哲学雑誌], No. 300, February 1912).
- 'Logical Understanding and Mathematical Understanding' [論理の理解と数理の理解] (Geibun [芸文], Vol. 3, No. 9, September 1912).
- 'Natural Sciences and the Study of History" [自然科学と歴史学] (Tetsugaku Zasshi [哲学雑誌], No. 319, September 1913).
- 'Response to Takahashi Satomi's Criticisms of My An Inquiry into the Good' [高橋文学士の拙著『善の研究』に対する批評に答う] (Tetsugaku Zasshi [哲学雑誌], No. 308, September 1912).
- 'Bergson's Philosophical Method' [ベルグソンの哲学的方法論] (Geibun [芸文], Vol. 1, No. 8, August 1910).
- 'Bergson's Pure Duration' [ベルグソンの純粋持続](Kyōiku Gakujutsu Kai [教育学術界], Vo. 24, No. 2, November 1911).
- 'Contemporary Philosophy' [現代の哲学] (Tetsugaku Kenkyū [哲学研究], No. 1, April 1916).

Added in the 2nd edition of 1922.

- 'Cohen's Pure Knowledge' [コーヘンの純粋意識] (Geibun [芸文], Vol. 7, No. 8, August 1916).

Added in the 2nd edition of 1922.

- 'Lotze's Metaphysics' [ロッツェの形而上学] (Lotze, Hōbunkan [宝文館], May 1917).

Added in the 2nd edition of 1922.

- 'Poincaré as Epistemologist' [認識論者としてのアンリ・ポアンカレ] (Geibun [芸文], Vol. 3, No. 10, October 1912).

Removed in the 2nd edition of 1922 but restored in the 3rd edition of 1937.

- 'On Tolstoy' [トルストイについて] (Geibun [芸文], Vol. 2, No. 1, January 1911).
- 'Gutoku Shinran' [愚禿親鸞] (Shūsokan [宗祖観], April 1911).
- 'Preface to Tanabe Ryuji, Koizumi Yakumo' [『小泉八雲伝』の序] (Waseda Daigaku Shuppanbu [早稲田大学出版部], April 1914).
- 'Preface to Fujioka Sakutarō, Lectures on the History of Japanese Literature' [『国文学史講話』の序] (Kaiseikan [開成館], March 1908).
- 'Preface to Henri Bergson, Matter and Memory' [『物質と記憶』の序文] (trans. Takahashi Satomi, Seibunkan [星文館], February 1914).

Removed in the 2nd edition of 1922.

- Modern Idealist Philosophy [現代における理想主義の哲学] (Kōdōkan [弘道館], May 1917), reprinted in NKZ12.

- 'Subjectivism' [主観主義].
- 'Objectivism' [客観主義].
- 'A Historical Overview of Idealist Philosophy' [理想主義哲学の史的概観].
- 'The School of Neo-Kantianism' [新カント学派].
- 'The School of Brentano' [ブレンタノ学派].
- 'Philosophy of Pure Experience [純粋経験の哲学].

- Intuition and Reflection in Self-Consciousness [自覚における直観と反省] (Iwanami Shoten [岩波書店], October 1917), reprinted in NKZ2.

Originally published as a serial in Geibun [芸文] (September 1913 to March 1916) which was continued in Tetsugaku Kenkyū [哲学研究] (October 1916 to May 1917).

- §§1-3 (Geibun [芸文], Vol. 4, No. 9, September 1913).
- §§4-6 (Geibun [芸文], Vol. 4, No. 11, November 1913).
- §§7-8 (Geibun [芸文], Vol. 5, No. 3, March 1914).
- §§9-10 (Geibun [芸文], Vol. 5, No. 8, August 1914).
- §§11-13 (Geibun [芸文], Vol. 5, No. 11, November 1914).
- §§14-15 (Geibun [芸文], Vol. 6, No. 1, January 1915).
- §§16-17 (Geibun [芸文], Vol. 6, No. 3, March 1915).
- §§18-20 (Geibun [芸文], Vol. 6, No. 6, June 1915).
- §§21-23 (Geibun [芸文], Vol. 6, No. 12, December 1915).
- §§24-26 (Geibun [芸文], Vol. 7, No. 1, January 1916).
- §§27-29 (Geibun [芸文], Vol. 7, No. 3, March 1916).
- §§30-32 (Tetsugaku Kenkyū [哲学研究], No. 7, October 1916).
- §§33-36 (Tetsugaku Kenkyū [哲学研究], No. 8, November 1916).
- §§37-38 (Tetsugaku Kenkyū [哲学研究], No. 9, December 1916).
- §39 (Tetsugaku Kenkyū [哲学研究], No. 10, January 1917).
- §§40-41 (Tetsugaku Kenkyū [哲学研究], No. 11, February 1917).
- §42 (Tetsugaku Kenkyū [哲学研究], No. 13, April 1917).
- §§43-44 (Tetsugaku Kenkyū [哲学研究], No. 14, May 1917).

- Problems of Consciousness [意識の問題] (Iwanami Shoten [岩波書店], January 1920), reprinted in NKZ2.

- 'What Consciousness Means' [意識とは何を意味するか] (Tetsugaku Kenkyū [哲学研究], No. 22, January 1918).
- 'Sensation' [感覚] (Tetsugaku Kenkyū [哲学研究], No. 27, June 1918).
- 'Feeling' [感情] (Tetsugaku Kenkyū [哲学研究], No. 28, July 1918).
- 'The True Meaning of Symbols' [象徴の真意義] (Shichō [思潮], March 1918).
- 'Will' [意志] (Geibun [芸文], Vol. 9, No. 9, September 1918).
- 'The Various Continuities of the Content of Experience' [経験内容の種々なる連続] (Tetsugaku Kenkyū [哲学研究], No. 35 and No. 36, February–March 1919).
- 'The Place of the Realisation of the Will' [意志実現の場所] (Geibun [芸文], Vol. 10, No. 4, April 1919).
- 'The Content of the Will' [意志の内容] (Tetsugaku Kenkyū [哲学研究], No. 38 and No. 39, May–June 1919).
- 'On Relations' [関係について] (Geibun [芸文], Vol. 9, No. 6, June 1919).
- 'On the Degrees of Consciousness' [意識の明暗について] (Tetsugaku Kenkyū [哲学研究], No. 42, September 1919).
- 'The Concept of the Individual' [個体概念] (Shirin [史林], Vol. 4, No. 1, January 1919).
- 'Leibniz's Ontological Proof' [ライプニッツの本体論的証明] (Geibun [芸文], Vol. 9, No. 1, January 1918).

- Art and Morality [芸術と道徳] (Iwanami Shoten [岩波書店], July 1923), reprinted in NKZ3.

- 'The Essence of Beauty' [美の本質] (Tetsugaku Kenkyū [哲学研究], No. 48 and No. 49, March–April 1920).
- 'Max Klinger's Painting and Drawing' [マックス・クリンゲルの『絵画と線画』の中から] (Geibun [芸文], Vol. 11, No. 10, October 1920).
- 'The Content of Feeling and the Content of the Will' [感情の内容と意志の内容] (Tetsugaku Kenkyū [哲学研究], No. 61, April 1921).
- 'The World of Objects of Reflective Judgement' [反省的判断の対象界] (Geibun [芸文], Vol. 12, No. 11, November 1921).
- 'The Intersection of the True, the Good and the Beautiful' [真善美の合一点] (Tetsugaku Kenkyū [哲学研究], No. 66, September 1921).
- 'Society and the Individual' [社会と個人] (Tetsugaku Kenkyū [哲学研究], No. 73, April 1922).
- 'Consciousness of Acts' [作用の意識] (Geibun [芸文], Vol. 13, No. 9 and No. 10, September to October 1922).
- 'The Acting Subject' [行為的主観] (Tetsugaku Kenkyū [哲学研究], No. 78, September 1923).
- 'The Will and Syllogism' [意志と推論式] (Shisō [思想], No. 12, September 1922).
- 'The Beautiful and the Good' [美と善] (Tetsugaku Kenkyū [哲学研究], No. 78, September 1922).
- 'Law and Morality' [法と道徳] (Tetsugaku Kenkyū [哲学研究], No. 83, February 1923).
- 'The True and the Beautiful' [真と美] (Kaizō [改造], February 1923).
- 'The True and the Good' [真と善] (Shisō [思想], No. 18, March 1923).

- From the Actor to the Seer [働くものから見るものへ] (Iwanami Shoten [岩波書店], October 1927), reprinted in NKZ3.

- 'The Immediately Given' [直接に与えられるもの] (Tetsugaku Kenkyū [哲学研究], No. 90, September 1923), reprinted in SPE1:37-66.
- 'Intuition and Will' [直観と意志] (Kōza [講座], November 1923).
- 'What Lies Behind Physical Phenomena' [物理現象の背後にあるもの] (Shisō [思想], No. 27, January 1924).
- 'On Internal Perception' [内部知覚について] (Tetsugaku Kenkyū [哲学研究], No. 96, No. 102 and No. 103, March–October 1924).
- 'Acts of Expression' [表現作用] (Shisō [思想], No. 41, March 1925).
- 'The Actor' [働くもの] (Tetsugaku Kenkyū [哲学研究], No. 115, October 1925).
- 'Place' [場所] (Tetsugaku Kenkyū [哲学研究], No. 123, June 1926), reprinted in SPE1:67-151.
- 'Response to Dr. Sōda Ki'ichirō' [左右田博士に答う] (Tetsugaku Kenkyū [哲学研究], No. 133, April 1927), reprinted in SPE1:153-187.

In response to Sōda's 'On the Method of Nishida's Philosophy: A Request to Professor Nishida for Clarification' [西田哲学の方法について——西田博士の教を乞う] (Tetsugaku Kenkyū [哲学研究], No. 127, October 1926).

- 'The Knower' [知るもの] (Shisō [思想], No. 70 and No. 71, August–September 1927).

- The System of Universals According to Self-Consciousness [一般者の自覚的体系] (Iwanami Shoten [岩波書店], January 1930), reprinted in NKZ4.

- 'The Logical Structure of the So-Called World of Objects of Knowledge' [いわゆる認識対象界の論理的構造] (Tetsugaku Kenkyū [哲学研究], No. 145, April 1928).

Nishida is referring to »die Welt der Erkenntnisgegenstände«.

- 'Logicism of the Predicate' [述語的論理主義] (Shisō [思想], No. 78, April 1928).
- 'The Place of That Which Sees Itself and the Place of Consciousness' [自己自身を見るもののおいてある場所と意識の場所] (Tetsugaku Kenkyū [哲学研究], No. 148, July 1928).
- 'The Intelligible World' [叡智的世界] (Tetsugaku Kenkyū [哲学研究], No. 151, October 1928), reprinted in SPE1:189-253.
- 'Intuitive Knowledge' [直観的知識] (Tetsugaku Kenkyū [哲学研究], No. 154, January 1929).
- 'The Relationship Between Being and What Lies Behind Being in the Self-Conscious Universal' [自覚的一般者においてあるもの及びそれとその背後にあるものとの関係] (Shisō [思想], No. 83, No. 84 and No. 85, April–June 1929).
- 'The Self-Determination of the Universal' [一般者の自己限定] (Shisō [思想], No. 88 and No. 89, September–October 1929).

- The Determination of the Nothing by Self-Consciousness [無の自覚的限定] (Iwanami Shoten [岩波書店], December 1932), reprinted in NKZ5.

- 'The Self-Determination of the Expressive Self' [表現的自己の自己限定] (Tetsugaku Kenkyū [哲学研究], No. 172 and No. 173, July–August 1930).
- 'Acts of Consciousness as the Self-Determination of Place' [場所の自己限定としての意識作用] (Shisō [思想], No. 100, September 1930).
- 'What I Call the Self-Conscious Determination of the Absolute Nothing' [私の絶対無の自覚的限定というもの] (Shisō [思想], No. 105 and No. 106, February–March 1931).
- 'The Self-Determination of the Eternal Now' [永遠の今の自己限定] (Tetsugaku Kenkyū [哲学研究], No. 184, July 1931).
- 'The Temporal and the Atemporal' [時間的なるもの及び非時間的なるもの] (Shisō [思想], No. 112, September 1931).
- 'Love of the Self, Love of the Other and the Dialectic' [自愛と他愛及び弁証法] (Tetsugaku Kenkyū [哲学研究], No. 191 and No. 192, February–March 1932).
- 'Free Will' [自由意志] (Shisō [思想], No. 120, May 1932).
- 'I and Thou' [私と汝] (Iwanami Kōza: Tetsugaku [岩波講座 哲学], July 1932 and September 1932), reprinted in SPE1:265-355.
- 'On the Philosophy of Life' [生の哲学について] (Risō [理想], October 1932).

- Fundamental Problems of Philosophy, Vol. 1: The World of Action [哲学の根本問題——行為の世界] (Iwanami Shoten [岩波書店], December 1933), reprinted in NKZ6.

- 'Prolegomena to Metaphysics' [形而上学序論] (Iwanami Kōza: Tetsugaku [岩波講座 哲学], February 1933).
- 'I and the World' [私と世界] (previously unpublished, begun in April 1933).

- Fundamental Problems of Philosophy, Vol. 2: The Dialectical World [哲学の根本問題 続編——弁証法的世界] (Iwanami Shoten [岩波書店], October 1934), reprinted in NKZ6.

- 'The Logical Structure of the Real World' [現実の世界の論理的構造] (Shisō [思想], No. 140, No. 141 and No. 142, January–March 1934).
- 'The World as a Dialectical Universal' [弁証法的一般者としての世界] (Tetsugaku Kenkyū [哲学研究], No. 219, No. 220 and No. 221, June–August 1935), reprinted in SPE2:37-172.
- 'Cultural Forms of the Ancient East and West as Viewed from the Standpoint of Metaphysics' [形而上学的立場から見た東西古代の文化形態] (previously unpublished).

- Philosophical Essays, Vol. 1: Plans for a System of Philosophy [哲学論文集 第1——哲学体系への企図] (Iwanami Shoten [岩波書店], November 1935), reprinted in NKZ7.

- 'The World's Self-Identity and Continuity' [世界の自己同一と連続] (Shisō [思想], No. 152, No. 153 and No. 154, January–March 1935).
- 'The Standpoint of Active Intuition' [行為的直観の立場] (Shisō [思想], No. 158, No. 159 and No. 160, July–September 1935).

- Thoughts and Experiences, Vol. 2 [続 思索と体験] (Iwanami Shoten [岩波書店], May 1937), reprinted in NKZ7.

- 'Remaining Problems of Consciousness' [取残されたる意識の問題] (in Festschrift for Tokunō Bun [得能博士還暦記念哲学論文集], Iwanami Shoten [岩波書店], July 1926).
- 'Anthropology' [人間学] (in Festschrift for Tomonaga Sanjūrō [朝永博士還暦記念哲学論文集], Iwanami Shoten [岩波書店], August 1930).
- 'History' [歴史] (Iwanami Kōza: Tetsugaku [岩波講座 哲学], November 1931).
- 'Hegel's Dialectic as Seen from My Standpoint' [私の立場から見たヘーゲルの弁証法] (in Hegel and Hegelianism [ヘーゲルとヘーゲル主義], Iwanami Shoten [岩波書店], February 1931).
- 'On Pedagogy' [教育学について] (previously unpublished, finished in February 1933).
- ''Being' in Greek Philosophy' [ギリシャ哲学においての「有るもの」] (Iwanami Kōza: Sekai Shichō [岩波講座 世界思潮], Vol. 3, April 1928).
- 'Self-Consciousness in Augustine' [アウグスチヌスの自覚] (Iwanami Kōza: Sekai Shichō [岩波講座 世界思潮], Vol. 7, July 1928).
- 'The Essence of Platonic Ideas' [プラトンのイデヤの本質] (Girisha-Raten Kōza [ギリシャ・ラテン講座], July 1931).
- 'My Thoughts on French Philosophy' [フランス哲学についての感想] (Shisō [思想], No. 176, January 1937).
- 'Bolzano's Autobiography' [ボルツァーノの自伝] (Tetsugaku Kenkyū [哲学研究], No. 80, November 1922).
- 'Abel the Mathematician' [数学者アーベル] (Asahi Shimbun, September 1933).
- 'Goethe's Background' [ゲーテの背景] (Goethe-Jahrbuch [ゲーテ年鑑], Vol. 1, May 1932).
- 'The Beauty of Writing' [書の美] (previously unpublished, finished in May 1930).
- 'The Flexibility of National Language' [国語の自在性] (Kokugo [国語], January 1936).
- 'The Objectivity of Knowledge' [知識の客観性] (Kaizō [改造], February 1933).
- 'Reminiscences of the Fourth Higher School' [四高の思出] (Shikō Dōsōkaihō, April 1927).
- 'The Retirement Speech of a Certain Professor' [ある教授の退職の辞] (Shisō [思想], No. 83, April 1929).
- 'A Poem on Kamakura' [鎌倉雑詠] (Shisō [思想], No. 84, May 1929).
- 'Two Translated Poems' [訳詩] (The Muse, August 1928 and September 1929).

The poems translated by Nishida here are Goethe's 'Mignon' and Browning's 'Home Thoughts from the Sea'.

- 'A Fireside Chat' [暖炉の側から] (The Muse, February 1931).
- 'My Copy of the Song Era Erya' [書影宋本爾雅後] (previously unpublished, finished in May 1933).
- 'Songs and Poems' [歌并詩] (previously unpublished, composed between 1920 and 1935).

- Philosophical Essays, Vol. 2 [哲学論文集 第2] (Iwanami Shoten [岩波書店], November 1937), reprinted in NKZ8.

- 'Logic and Life' [論理と生命] (Shisō [思想], No. 170, No. 171 and No. 172, July–September 1936), reprinted in SPE2:173-300.
- 'Praxis and the Knowledge of Objects: The Place of Knowledge in the Historical World' [実践と対象認識——歴史的世界においての認識の立場] (Tetsugaku Kenkyū [哲学研究], No. 252, No. 253 and No. 254, March–May 1937).
- 'Problems of Species Formation and Development' [種の生成発展の問題] (Shisō [思想], No. 182, July 1937).
- 'Active Intuition' [行為的直観] (Shisō [思想], No. 183, August 1937), reprinted in SPE2:301-331.

- Philosophical Essays, Vol. 3 [哲学論文集 第3] (Iwanami Shoten [岩波書店], November 1939), reprinted in NKZ8.

- 'Human Existence' [人間的存在] (Shisō [思想], No. 190, March 1938), reprinted in SPE2:333-400.
- 'The Standpoint of the Individual in the Historical World' [歴史的世界においての個物の立場] (Shisō [思想], No. 195 and No. 196, August–September 1938).
- 'Absolutely Contradictory Self-Identity' [絶対矛盾的自己同一] (Shisō [思想], No. 202, March 1939), reprinted in SPE3:7-84.
- 'The Science of Experience' [経験科学] (Shisō [思想], No. 207 August 1939).

- Problems of Japanese Culture [日本文化の問題] (Iwanami Shoten [岩波書店], March 1940), reprinted in NKZ9.
- Philosophical Essays, Vol. 4 [哲学論文集 第4] (Iwanami Shoten [岩波書店], November 1941), reprinted in NKZ9.

- 'Prolegomena to Practical Philosophy' [実践哲学序論] (Iwanami Kōza: Rinrigaku [岩波講座 倫理学], Vol. 2, August 1940).
- 'Poiēsis and Praxis: An Appendix to the Prolegomena to Practical Philosophy' [ポイエシスとプラクシス——実践哲学序論補説] (Shisō [思想], No. 223, December 1940).
- 'Artistic Creation as Historical Acts of Formation' [歴史的形成作用としての芸術的創作] (Shisō [思想], No. 228 and No. 229, May-June 1941), reprinted in SPE3:85-176.
- 'The Problem of Raison d'État' [国家理由の問題] (Iwanami Kōza: Rinrigaku [岩波講座 倫理学], Vol. 8, September 1941).

- Philosophical Essays, Vol. 5 [哲学論文集 第5] (Iwanami Shoten [岩波書店], August 1944), reprinted in NKZ9.

- 'On the Objectivity of Knowledge: A New Foundation for Epistemology' [知識の客観性について——新たなる知識論の基盤] (Shisō [思想], No. 248 and No. 249, January–February 1943).
- 'On Self-Consciousness: Laying the Foundation for the Preceding Essay' [自覚について——前論文の基礎付け] (Shisō [思想], No. 252 and No. 253, May–June 1943), reprinted in SPE3:177-267.

- Philosophical Essays, Vol. 6 [哲学論文集 第6] (Iwanami Shoten [岩波書店], December 1945), reprinted in NKZ10.

- 'The World of Physics' [物理の世界] (Shisō [思想], No. 260, January 1944).
- 'Logic and Mathematics' [論理と数理] (Shisō [思想], No. 262, March 1944).
- 'Towards a Philosophy of Religion with the Concept of Pre-Established Harmony as Guide' [予定調和を手引きとして宗教哲学へ] (Shisō [思想], No. 264, May–June 1944).
- 'On Cartesian Philosophy' [デカルト哲学について] (Shisō [思想], No. 265, July 1944), reprinted in SPE3:269-298.
- 'Tradition' [伝統] (Shisō [思想], No. 256, September 1943).
- 'Space' [空間] (previously unpublished, finished in July 1944).
- 'Laying the Philosophical Foundations of Mathematics' [数学の哲学的基礎付け] (previously unpublished, composed between December 1944 and January 1945).

- Philosophical Essays, Vol. 7 [哲学論文集 第7] (Iwanami Shoten [岩波書店], February 1946), reprinted in NKZ10.

- 'Life' [生命] (Shisō [思想], No. 267 and No. 268, October 1944–August 1945).
- 'The Logic of Place and the Religious Worldview' [場所的論理と宗教的世界観] (previously unpublished, composed between February and April 1945), reprinted in SPE3:299-397.

- Thoughts and Experiences, Vol. 3 [『続 思索と体験』以後] (Iwanami Shoten [岩波書店], March 1948), reprinted in NKZ10.
- Shorter Writings, reprinted in NKZ11

- 'An Outline of Green's Ethics' [グリーン氏倫理哲学の大意] (Kyōiku Jiron, Nos. 362–4, May 1895), reprinted in NKZ11.

Nishida's first published work.

- 'Hume's Law of Causation' [ヒュームの因果法].
- 'Debating the Existence of Innate Knowledge' [先天智識の有無を論ず].
- 'My Thoughts on Yamamoto Yasunosuke's Essay 'Religion and Reason'' [山本安之助君の「宗教と理性」という論文を読みて所感を述ぶ].
- 'An Explication of the Beautiful' [美の説明].
- 'Benedictus Spinoza' [ベネヂクトス、スピノーザ].
- 'Kantianism in Ethics' [カント倫理学主義].
- 'On Contemporary Religion' [現今の宗教について].
- 'The School of Self-Consciousness' [自覚主義].
- 'My Contribution to Recommended Books for Edification' [『静修書目答問』への回答].
- 'The Essence of Religion' [宗教の本質].
- 'Jakob Boehme' [ヤコッブ、ベーメ].
- 'The Inside and the Outside of the Soul' [心の中と外].
- 'Miscellaneous Thoughts' [雑感].
- 'An Apology for Philosophy' [哲学のアポロジー].
- 'Reading' [読書].
- 'On the So-Called Japaneseness' [日本的ということについて].
- 'On Reading Tanaka Ōdō's Review' [田中王堂君の批評を読みて].
- 'Augustine's Theory of Trinity' [アウグスチヌスの三位一体論].
- 'The World of Objects of Art' [芸術の対象界].
- 'On Contemporary Idealism' [現今の理想主義について].
- 'Russell as a Scholar' [学者としてのラッスル].
- 'The Meaning of My Voluntarism' [私の主意主義の意味].
- 'Explanation of Philosophical Terms' [哲学用語解説].
- 'After the Great Earthquake' [大震災の後に].

- Lectures

- 'Modern Idealist Philosophy' [現代における理想主義の哲学], reprinted in NKZ12.
- 'Fichte's Philosophy' [フイヒテの哲学], reprinted in NKZ12.
- 'Cohen's Philosophy' [コーヘンの哲学], reprinted in NKZ12.
- 'Plato's Philosophy' [プラトンの哲学], reprinted in NKZ12.
- 'The Concept of Personality as the Ground of Reality' [実在の根柢としての人格概念], reprinted in NKZ12.
- 'The World of Action' [行為の世界], reprinted in NKZ12.
- 'The Logical Structure of the Real World' [現実の世界の論理的構造], reprinted in NKZ12.
- 'The Body as Historical' [歴史的身体], reprinted in NKZ12.
- 'Problems of Japanese Culture' [日本文化の問題], reprinted in NKZ13.
- 'The Reciprocal Relationship and Communication Between Pure Experiences' [純粋経験相互の関係および連絡について], reprinted in NKZ13.
- 'Anti-Natural-Scientific Thought' [反自然科学的思想], reprinted in NKZ13.
- 'Contemporary Spiritualism' [現今の唯心論], reprinted in NKZ13.
- 'The Concept of Scientific Truth in Contemporary Philosophy' [現代哲学における科学的真理の概念], reprinted in NKZ13.
- 'Contemporary Idealism' [現今の理想主義], reprinted in NKZ13.
- 'Coincidentia oppositorum and Love' [Coincidentia oppositorumと愛], reprinted in NKZ13.
- 'The Standpoint of Religion' [宗教の立場], reprinted in NKZ13.
- 'Eckhart's Mysticism and the Life at Ittōen' [エックハルトの神秘説と一燈園生活], reprinted in NKZ13.
- 'What I Call the Universal of Judgement' [私の判断的一般者というもの], reprinted in NKZ13.
- 'Life, Reality and Logic' [生と実在と論理], reprinted in NKZ13.
- 'On Time and Personality' [時と人格], reprinted in NKZ13.
- 'On Personality' [人格について], reprinted in NKZ13.
- 'The Logical Structure of the Real World' [現実の世界の論理的構造], reprinted in NKZ13.
- 'My Philosophical Position and Method' [私の哲学の立場と方法], reprinted in NKZ13.
- 'On Traditionalism' [伝統主義について], reprinted in NKZ13.

- Lecture Notes

- 'The Study of Religion' [宗教学] (1914-15), reprinted in NKZ14.

Nishida's sources for these lectures include Leuba, The Psychological Study of Religion (1912); Starbuck, The Psychology of Religion (1899); Edward Scribner Ames, The Psychology of Religious Experience (1910); James, The Varieties of Religious Experience (1902); Tiele, Grundzüge der Religionswissenschaft (1904); Hermann Siebeck, Lehrbuch der Religionsphilosophie (1893); and Höffding, Religionsphilosophie (1901).

- 'An Outline of Philosophy' [哲学概論], reprinted in NKZ14.

Nishida gave these introductory lectures annually while at Kyoto Imperial University. This version is based on notes from the Taishō and Shōwa era.

- 'Aristotle's Metaphysics' [アリストテレスの形而上学] (1924-25), reprinted in NKZ14.
- 'Plotinus' Philosophy' [プロチノスの哲学] (1924-25), reprinted in NKZ14.
- 'A History of Ethics in Britain' [英国倫理学史] (ca. 1904), reprinted in NKZ14.

Nishida breaks this history into four periods: [1] The Beginning (Hobbes); [2] The First Phase (Cudworth, Cumberland, Locke); [3] The Second Phase (Shaftesbury, Hutcheson, Butler, Hume, Smith, Hartley); and [4] The Third Phase (Intuition School: Price, Reid; Utilitarianism: Paley, Bentham, Mill; Evolutional Ethics: Spencer).

- 'Lectures on Psychology' [心理学講義] (1904-05), reprinted in NKZ14.

Nishida's sources for these lectures include Wundt, Grundriss der Psychologie (1896); Ziehen, Psychophysiologische Erkenntnistheorie (1898); and Külpe, Grundriss der Psychologie auf experimenteller Grundlage dargestellt (1893).

- 'A Draft of Ethics' [倫理学草案] (1904-05), reprinted in NKZ14.

Nishida's sources include Sidgwick, Outlines of the History of Ethics for English Readers (1886); Martineau, Types of Ethical Theory (1885); and James Mackintosh, Dissertation on the Progress of Ethical Philosophy: Chiefly During the Seventeenth and Eighteenth Centuries (1836)

- 'An Outline of Philosophy' [哲学概論], reprinted in NKZ15.

This version is based on notes from the late Meiji era, so the early incarnations of these introductory lectures.

- 'Vorlesung 1926', reprinted in NKZ15.
- 'Ethics Lecture Notes' [倫理学講義ノート], reprinted in NKZ25.
- 'The Study of Religion Lecture Notes' [宗教学講義ノート], reprinted in NKZ25.

- Fragments and Notes, reprinted in NKZ16.
- Diaries

- Diary entries from 1897 to 1912, reprinted in NKZ17.
- Diary entries from 1913 to 1945, reprinted in NKZ18.

- Correspondence

- Letters from 1887 to 1920, reprinted in NKZ19.
- Letters from 1921 to 1930, reprinted in NKZ20.
- Letters from 1931 to 1936, reprinted in NKZ21.
- Letters from 1937 to 1941, reprinted in NKZ22.
- Letters from 1942 to 1945, reprinted in NKZ23.

- Other

- 'On Reality' [実在について] (Tetsugaku Zasshi [哲学雑誌], No. 241, March 1907), revised and reprinted in An Inquiry into the Good.
- 'A Theory of Ethics' [倫理学説] (Tōa no Hikari [東亜の光], Vol. 3, No. 3 and No. 4, March-April 1908), revised and reprinted in An Inquiry into the Good.
- 'Pure Experience, Thought, Will and Intellectual Intuition' [純粋経験と思惟、意志、および知的直観] (Tetsugaku Zasshi [哲学雑誌], No. 258, August 1908), revised and reprinted in An Inquiry into the Good.
- 'Levels of Social Good' [社会的善の階級] (Seikyō Shinpō [正教新報], No. 666, September 1908).
- 'The Reciprocal Relationship and Communication Between Pure Experiences' [純粋経験相互の関係および連絡について] (Tetsugaku Zasshi [哲学雑誌], No. 276, February 1910), revised and reprinted in An Inquiry into the Good.
- 'The Self-Determination of the Universal and Self-Consciousness' [一般者の自己限定と自覚] (Tetsugaku Kenkyū [哲学研究], No. 163, October 1929).
- 'Philosophy and Education' [哲学と教育] (Iwanami Kōza: Kyōiku Kagaku [岩波講座 教育科学], Vol. 18, March 1933).

=== Translated works ===
==== English ====
- An Inquiry into the Good, trans. Masao Abe and Christopher Ives. New Haven: Yale University Press, 1990.
- "An Explanation of Beauty," trans. Steve Odin. Monumenta Nipponica vol. 42 no. 2 (1987): 211–217.
- Intuition and Reflection in Self-Consciousness, trans. Valdo H. Viglielmo, Takeuchi Yoshinori and Joseph S. O'Leary. Albany: State University of New York Press, 1987.
- Last Writings: Nothingness and the Religious Worldview, trans. David Dilworth. Honolulu: University of Hawaii Press, 1993.
  - "Logic of the Place of Nothingness and the Religious Worldview"
  - "Concerning My Logic"
- Place and Dialectic: Two Essays by Nishida Kitaro, trans. John W. M. Krummel and Shigenori Nagatomo. Oxford; New York: Oxford University Press, 2012.
- Ontology of Production: Three Essays, trans. William Haver. Durham, NC: Duke University Press, 2012.
- The Unsolved Issue of Consciousness, trans. John W. M. Krummell, in Philosophy East and West 62, no 1 (2012): 44–59.

==== French ====
- L'Éveil à soi, trans. Jacynthe Tremblay. Paris: CNRS Éditions, 2003, 298 p.
- De ce qui agit à ce qui voit, trans. Jacynthe Tremblay. Montréal: Presses de l'Université de Montréal, 2015, 364 p.
- Autoéveil. Le Système des universels, trans. Jacynthe Tremblay. Nagoya: Chisokudō Publications, 2017.

== See also ==
- Meontology
- Nishi Shinichiro
- Nothingness
- Philosopher's Walk
- Soku hi

== Footnotes ==
Preceded by unknown	Department of Philosophy (Chair), Kyoto University; 1913-1928	Succeeded by Hajime Tanabe
