= Asian Ethnology =

- Discipline: Asian Studies, Anthropology, Ethnology, Religious Studies
- Language: English
- Edited by: Benjamin Dorman and Frank J. Korom

Publication details
- Former names: Folklore Studies; Asian Folklore Studies
- History: 1942–present
- Publisher: Nanzan University Anthropological Institute (Japan)
- Frequency: Semi-annual
- Open access: Yes

Standard abbreviations
- ISO 4: Asian Ethnol.

Indexing
- ISSN: 1882-6865
- JSTOR: 18826865
- OCLC no.: 298239510

Links
- Journal homepage

Asian Ethnology is an open access, peer-reviewed journal dedicated to the promotion of research on the peoples and cultures of Asia. It was first published in 1942 at the Catholic University of Peking as Folklore Studies and subsequently at Nanzan University, where from 1963 to 2007 it was known as Asian Folklore Studies.

The journal is indexed in Arts and Humanities Citation Index, Bibliography of Asian Studies, Directory of Open Access Journals, and EBSCO Information Services' Academic Search Complete.
