= Confucianism in the United States =

Confucianism in the United States dates back to accounts of missionaries who traveled to China during the early 19th century in the United states by Chinese immigrants and via trade of technology, science and philosophy from east Asia to Europe and the America's. Since the second half of the 20th century, it has had an increased scholarly interest. American scholars of Confucianism are generally taught in universities in the philosophy or religions departments. Whether Confucianism should be categorized as a religion has been controversial in U.S and abroad.

Contemporary discussion of Confucianism in the U.S. centers on questions about its modern relevance in America and its ability to be studied and practiced outside China and East Asia. Major topics discussed by scholars of Confucianism in the U.S. include Confucian humaneness (ren), ritual or rights (li), Confucianism in global cultural dialogue, and its relationship to universal values.

Compared to Buddhism (another East Asian tradition which has been widely popularized and practiced in the U.S.), Confucianism has received little attention beyond a small circle of academic specialists. Apart from occasional lectures on Confucianism, Confucius Institutes across the United States have little influence in promoting Confucian philosophy or Confucianism as a way of life. The association of Confucianism with historical and political expressions which endorsed hierarchical relationships and suppressed individual rights may have prevented it from achieving a wider influence in the U.S. because it is seen as conflicting with American (and universal) values of democracy and human rights. Contemporary American scholars of Confucianism are exploring the possibility of a dialogue between Confucianism and universal values, and applying Confucian teachings to modern American life.

== History ==
The history of Confucianism in the U.S. can be separated into three periods.

=== 1830s to early 1900s ===
Since the 1830s, a number of missionaries traveled to China to spread Christianity and wrote accounts of Confucianism. Among them were Elijah Coleman Bridgman (1801-1861), Samuel Wells Williams (1812-1884), and Arthur Henderson Smith (1845-1932). In addition to their missionary work, they studied the Chinese language and familiarized themselves with Chinese culture. Williams' 1848 book, The Middle Kingdom, was the first comprehensive scholarly work on China by an American. He spoke highly of Confucius, and considered the Analects incomparable to any other book in history with the exception of the Bible. During the 1870s, institutions devoted to China studies and Confucianism began to take root at Yale and Harvard Universities and the University of California.

=== Early 20th century ===
The general attitudes of American scholars toward Confucianism during this period can be grouped into two strands. One group (heavily influenced by Max Weber) viewed it as inferior to Western, Christian-based culture and the reason for the stagnation of contemporary Chinese society. Another school of thought, represented by Sinologist H. G. Greel, affirmed the value of interpersonal bonds (ren lun) in Confucianism and regarded Confucius as one of the most important figures in human history. Greel argued that Confucianism played a constructive role in influencing the Age of Enlightenment, examining Confucianism in detail in Confucius and the Chinese Way (1949) and Birth of China (1936).

==== China ====
In comparison to a growing interest in Confucianism in the U.S., the 1905 abandonment of the civil-service-examination system posed a major challenge to the significance of Confucianism in China (since the examination was largely based on mastery of classical Confucian texts). The 1911 collapse of the Qing dynasty and the New Culture Movement, led by Chinese students and intellectuals, also dealt major blows to traditional Chinese values, practices and language. Chinese intellectuals became increasingly drawn to liberalism or Marxism as they tried to develop a model of what a new China should look like. Some, such as Liang Shuming (1893-1988), Zhang Junmai (1886-1969) and Xiong Shili (1885-1968), continued to defend Confucianism as a solution to China's ills.

=== Late 20th century ===
Confucian scholarship flourished during the late 20th century. A number of New Confucian scholars from mainland China emigrated to the U.S. after the founding of the People's Republic of China, including Zhang Junmai (Carson Chang) and He Lin. Their proteges, such as Tu Weiming, Cheng Chungying, Yu Ying-shih, and Liu Shuxian, established a new emphasis on Confucian study in the United States. The period also saw growing American interest in Confucianism and Chinese culture, marked by watershed events such as the founding of the PRC and the Korean War. The work of Mou Zongsan also informed Confucian scholarship in America during this period. Mou is known as part of the second generation of New Confucians; contemporaries include Tang Junyi and Xu Fuguan. Confucian scholars who came to the U.S. engage with Western philosophers such as Hegel and Kant, re-interpreting classical texts and responding to global democratization and the rule of law characterizing the second half of the century. A number of institutions devoted to the study of China and Confucianism emerged during this period, including the John King Fairbank Center of Harvard University and the University of Hawaii. Prominent American scholars of Confucianism in the U.S. during this period include William Theodore de Bary, Benjamin Schwartz, Thomas A. Metzger, David Hall, and Roger T. Ames.

== Contemporary scholarship ==
=== Philosophy ===
The controversy about categorizing Confucianism as a philosophy is tied to the controversy surrounding Chinese philosophy and the issue of translation. The Chinese word for philosophy (zhe xue) is a translation from the Japanese which came into existence during the early 20th century. Hu Shih's Outline of a History of Chinese Philosophy (1918) and Feng Youlan's History of Chinese Philosophy (1934) established the concept of Confucianism as a philosophy. Controversies about categorizing Confucianism as philosophy stem from China and the West; Western philosophers question Confucianism's metaphysical sophistication, and objections from China argue that categorizing Confucianism as philosophy violates key aspects of the tradition.

=== Tradition ===
More than a subject of theoretical inquiry, Confucianism is related to practices that seek to improve oneself and one's world. Contemporary Confucian scholars in the U.S. differ about the inheritance of rituals (the historical practice of Confucian traditions), emphasizing Confucianism's practical aspects in orienting one's ethical life: the way one perceives (and acts) in the world. The view of Confucianism as a tradition challenges the way it should be practiced today. In Contemporary Confucian Political Philosophy, Stephen Angle writes: "It may not be as easy to know how to practice Confucianism today as it once was", because "pre-twentieth century Chinese society had various well-trodden paths to follow, based in part in a deeply ingrained ritualization of life". Angle also argues that the practice of Confucianism in modern times can benefit from "critical modern innovations like broad political participation, the rule of law, and the active rooting out of social oppression."

=== Religion ===
Whether Confucianism can be categorized as a religion is controversial. According to Bin Song of Boston University, it is "deeply spiritual, but not religious."

American Confucian scholars Philip J. Ivanhoe, Robert Cummings Neville, and Tu Weiming agree about Confucianism's religious aspect. Ivanhoe describes Confucian spirituality as a means of integrating oneself into the larger patterns of life embedded in society and nature: "Cultivating the self in order to take one's place in this universal scheme describes the central task of life". Neville lists three criteria for a religious tradition—a cosmology, a body of rituals, and a path of spiritual perfection—and believes that all three apply to Confucianism. Tu defines Confucian religiosity as communal self-transformation and a faithful response to the transcendent, characterizing it as the Confucian prescription "for learning to be fully human". Confucianism believes that the ultimate meaning of life is realizable through ordinary daily existence.

=== Ruism ===
Bin Song uses the term "Ruism" instead of "Confucianism". According to Song, "Confucianism" implies the absolute authority of Confucius' teachings and "no one in the Ru tradition would have ever dared to critique Confucius in any conceivable way." He believes that the term "Ruism" better captures the spirit of criticism he sees in the teachings of great Ru thinkers such as Confucius, Mencius, and Wang Yangming. Song seeks to the shed light on the spiritual dimension of Ruism, which encourages autonomy and criticism and departs from religious dogmatism.

=== Philosophical schools ===
Robert Cummings Neville proposes that scholars of Confucianism in the U.S. fall into three major categories: interpretive philosophers who are devoted to translation, bridging philosophers who compare Confucianism with Western thought, and normative philosophers who aim to promote Confucianism's contemporary significance in global cultural conversations. Although there are no sharp divisions between the philosophical schools, the primarily-interpretive philosophers were generally trained as historians and textual critics; normative thinkers were generally trained as philosophers.

==== Interpretive philosophers ====
William Theodore de Bary has taught East Asian thought for many years at Columbia University, and has trained many scholars of Chinese philosophy in the United States and Canada. He has led the Columbia University Seminar on Neo-Confucianism, edited the Sources of Chinese Tradition (1960) and edited and contributed to a number of conference volumes, including Self and Society in Ming Thought (1970) and The Unfolding of Neo-Confucianism (1975).

==== Bridging philosophers ====
Herbert Fingarette's Confucius: The Secular as Sacred has been an important book on Chinese philosophy for Western philosophers. Fingarette's thesis is that the Confucian notion of ritual to make social relations possible and to be the medium of ethics. David Shepherd Nivison of Stanford University also contributed to the solution of contemporary Western philosophical problems. Nivison's major work was The Ways of Confucianism: Investigations in Chinese Philosophy (1996). Philip J. Ivanhoe, an American historian of Confucianism and a philosophy professor, relates Confucian thought to contemporary philosophical problems (primarily ethics). Ivanhoe's book Confucian Moral Self Cultivation (1993) studies six thinkers: Confucius, Mencius, Xunzi, Zhu Xi, Wang Yangming, and Dai Zhen, showing the contemporary relevance of their thought. Described by scholar Andrew Lambert as a bridging text, Mathew A. Foust's Confucianism and American Philosophy (2017) traces direct lines of influence from early translations of Confucian texts to classical American philosophy and brings to light conceptual affinities that have been previously overlooked.

==== Normative philosophers ====
Normative philosophers identify some Chinese school (such as Confucianism or Daoism) as central to their own heritage; their main philosophic intent is neither interpretation nor comparison, but the normative engagement of contemporary philosophical problems. Philosophers in this category include Roger T. Ames, David Hall, Tu Weiming, and Chung-ying Cheng. Roger T. Ames and David Hall, professors at the University of Hawaii, collaborated on three books: Thinking Through Confucius (1987), Anticipating China (1995), and Thinking from the Han (1998). Ames and Hall contrast Western and Chinese cultures and distill each into certain essential characteristics. Western culture is based on transcendent ordering principles; Chinese culture is based on "correlative thinking", identifying classifications which are themselves correlated.

=== Boston Confucians ===
==== Origin ====
The Boston Confucians are a group of philosophers who believe that Confucianism is a portable tradition which can be applied to contexts outside its pre-modern-Chinese origin. Attendees of a 1992 Confucian-Christianity conference began to refer to Robert Cummings Neville, a Confucian scholar and Christian theologian from Boston University, and his colleagues as "Boston Confucians." Although the term "Boston Confucianism" was used as "affectionate teasing and tongue-in-cheek self-description," it came to be used as "a semi-serious label" for the view that "Confucianism is not limited to East Asian ethnic application" and "has something genuinely interesting and helpful to bring to contemporary philosophical discussions". In addition to Neville, major figures of Boston Confucianism are John Berthrong and Tu Weiming. Bin Song has published a series of articles in the Huffington Post about the contemporary relevance of Ruism. Among Boston Confucians, the "North-of-the-Charles" school (Tu Weiming and his Harvard colleagues) emphasizes "Mencian humaneness and expresses with new subtlety the Confucian worry that the Christian creation myth has some objectionable literal commitments to God as a being separate from the world".

== Confucian Based Values ==
=== Humanity (Ren) ===
The classical Confucian term ren (benevolence or humaneness) is central to the Confucian ideal as seen by the Boston Confucians, although different members have nuanced disagreements about its implications. Tu Weiming understands ren as supreme self-cultivation and the fullest manifestation of humanity. Tu's interpretation of humanity is in line with Mencius' notion of the inherent goodness of human nature and the continuity of that nature with the development of civilization. Tu notes the "gradual process of extension of love," and the expression of our humanity that "ren is most exemplified in our caring toward our relatives (qin qin)." He spells out the spiritual dimension in the attainment of humaneness, an "inseparability of the Human Way and the Way of Heaven."

Robert Neville, agreeing with Tu on the central importance of humanity in Confucian thought, echoes Xunzi's concern that people need rituals to achieve humanity because they are selfish by nature. Xunzi is less confident about the readiness of human nature to develop full-fledged morality, emphasizing the importance of environment and rituals to "set aright" the inborn nature of humanity. Neville compares the Confucian concept of ren and the Christian notion of love, noting an agreement between Confucius and Christians that the capacity for love is inborn and definitive of what it means to be human.

=== Ritual propriety (Li) ===
The interpretation of ritual propriety in Boston Confucianism stems from two strands of Confucian thinking. Tu Weiming's Mencian tradition is that humans' feelings about what is appropriate is inborn, but Neville emphasizes Xunzi's ritual propriety; human endowments are undetermined, and we must learn to approach moral perfection through rituals.

For Tu, humanity (ren) is the inner essence of human nature; the heavenly principle (tian li) must express itself in external social relations through ritual propriety. He disagrees that li refers only to structured ceremonies, saying that "it points to a concrete way whereby one enters into communion with others". Neville emphasizes the need for ritual propriety to act as a corrective for emotion: "Our feelings can provide emotive power in all directions, but need learned discrimination to find appropriate objects and appropriate responses." He sees ritual propriety as necessary to achieve ren.

=== Dialogue ===
The idea of civilized dialogue is advanced by Tu Weiming about Confucianism's contemporary global relevance. Tu identifies the twenty-first century as a new Axial Age, in which cultural and religious pluralism can foster constructive dialogue between traditions and civilizations. The concept of dialogue between civilizations was also a response to the theory of the "clash of civilizations" proposed by Samuel P. Huntington, who argued that international conflict in the post-Cold War era was primarily caused by conflicts between cultural and religious identities. In contrast, Tu is hopeful that with "tolerance, recognition, and respect" the possibility exists for two partners in dialogue to "take the other as reference" and learn from each other.

Tu sees Confucianism as having unique value in dialogue between civilizations, which must exist to sustain its relevance as a living tradition. He proposes that the development of Confucianism can be separated into three epochs: classical Confucianism (traced back to early thinkers such as Confucius, Mencius, and Xunzi), Neo-Confucianism (during the Song and Ming dynasties), and 20th-century New Confucianism. The defining characteristic of the latter is its participation in global civilizational dialogue. Tu sees Confucian humanism as an important spiritual resource in responding to global challenges such as the ecological crisis, social alienation, anomie and egoism. Confucianism would also benefit from participation in such a dialogue; according to Tu, "If the well-being of humanity is its central concern, Confucian humanism in the third epoch cannot afford to be confined to East Asian culture. A global perspective is needed to universalize its concerns. Confucians can benefit from dialogue with Jewish, Christian, and Islamic theologians, with Buddhists, with Marxists, and with Freudian and post-Freudian psychologists.". Tu believes that New Confucianism must respond to four challenges from the West: (1) scientific inquiry, (2) democracy, (3) Western religiosity and its sense of transcendence, and (4) the Freudian psychological exploration of human nature.

=== Controversy ===
Bryan Van Norden, in his review of the book Boston Confucianism, questions the originality of Boston Confucians' argument about the portability of Confucian tradition. Van Norden suggests that the portability of Confucianism had already been widely acknowledged before the book was published. The emergence of Neo-Confucianism in the Song and Ming dynasties and the spread of Confucianism to other parts of Asia were examples of Confucianism as an evolving, portable tradition. According to Van Norden, "Neville's label is original, but the concept is not."

Stephen C. Angle, a Confucian philosopher and professor of philosophy and East Asian studies at Wesleyan University, writes in his essay "American Confucianism: Between Tradition and Universal Values" that Boston Confucianism has had a limited impact in promoting Confucian values and practices in the U.S. The Chinese Confucian world has criticized Tu Weiming's use of Western religious concepts and terminology in describing Confucianism, which they consider inappropriate.

== Progressive Confucianism ==
Progressive Confucianism is a term coined by Stephen C. Angle which sheds light on Confucianism's engagement with universal values such as democracy and human rights. Angle gives the term a two-dimensional meaning; it describes the core Confucian commitment to individual and collective moral progress, and believes that ethical insight can lead to progressive political change (which leads to greater realization of our potential for virtue). It is influenced by Mou Zongsan's idea of "self-restriction", which connects morality and the rule of law. Major concerns of Angle's Progressive Confucianism include human rights, the rule of law, and gender equality. His prescription of Confucianism for progressive political change is in line with "a kind of constitutional democracy," but he stresses that Progressive Confucianism is more than constitutional democracy. Angle offers a creative Confucian interpretation of ritual (an aspect of Confucianism often criticized for its association with hierarchical relationships, filial piety and oppression), writing that "Progressive Confucians must stand against oppression, notwithstanding historical Confucian complacency concerning many types of oppression". For Angle, progressive changes in political institutions and social relationships is compatible with Confucianism and essential to upholding its essence: "the ideal of all individuals developing their capacities for virtue—ultimately aiming at sagehood—through their relationships with one another and with their environment."

=== Critiques ===
Tongdong Bai, a professor of philosophy at Fudan University, wrote about Angle's Progressive Confucianism that there may be more alternatives to Confucian political institutions than liberal democracy. Bai said that contemporary Confucian political thinkers, such as Daniel A. Bell, Jiang Qing and himself, "don't believe that history ends with liberal democracy," but would "try to offer alternatives, such as a hybrid regime that combines democratic elements with meritocratic elements."

Bao Wenxin, a researcher at the Shanghai Academy of Social Sciences, wrote that the layers of meaning embedded in the Chinese word "progressive" (进步) may have rendered the label of Progressive Confucianism a vague one. Bao suggests that Angle's argument that Progressive Confucianism promotes collective moral progress may not be as evident in traditional Confucianism before the 20th century. According to Leigh Jenco, Angle's creation of a modernized Confucianism is almost ironic: "Confucianism becomes relevant and 'modern' only to the extent that it can incorporate certain prior commitments to such key values as rule of law and human rights".
