= Guush Luvsandanzan =

17th century Mongolian writer

- Born: Guush Luvsandanzan; 16th century
- Died: First half of the 17th century
- Occupation: Writer
- Writing career
- Notable work: Altan Tobchi

Guush Luvsandanzan, also Lubsangdandzin (fl. early 17th century), was a Mongolian historian and writer.

== Work ==
Lubsangdandzin is best known for his 17th century Altan Tobchi (in full: Herein is contained the Golden Summary of the Principles of Statecraft as established by the Ancient Khans), uniting Chinggisid and Buddhist traditions.

The work contains 233 of the 282 chapters of the Secret History of the Mongols, some of them with additional details. Further, in it are discussed the socioeconomic condition, art and culture of Mongolia. It is also significant in that it is a major source of knowledge on the "Chingisiin Bilig" or Wisdom of Genghis, a code of ethical conduct specifically directed toward future generations of Mongolian ruling nobility.

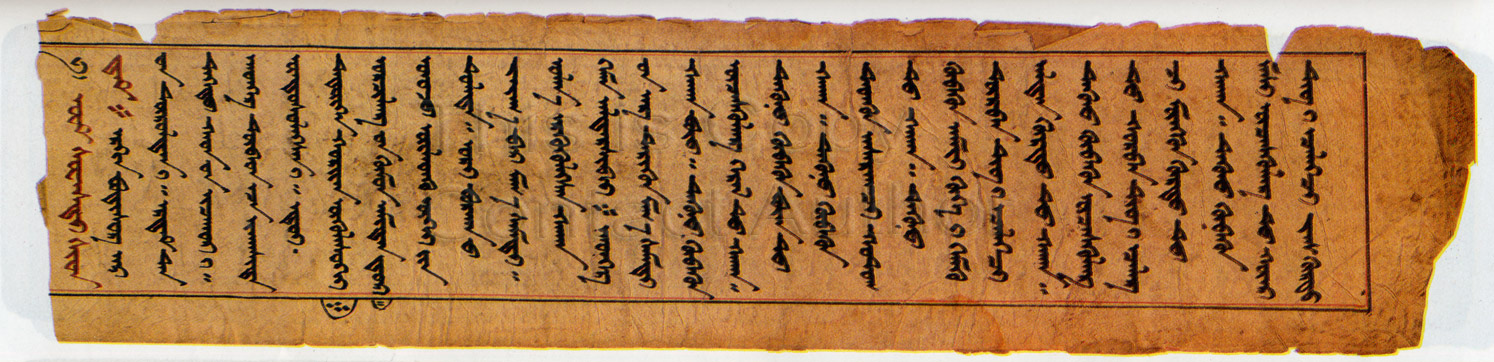
First page of the 1604 Altan Tobchi

The work is composed of three major sections. The first presents a mythological genealogy of the descent of Borte Chino, the ancestor of Genghis Khan, from King Mahasammadi of India and various Tibetan rulers like Namri Songtsen (the grandfather of Borte Chino and father of Tengri Khan), linking the Mongol state with the legendary Chakravarti kings. In the next major section are the 233 chapters of the Secret History interspersed with additional material that adds to the Altan Tobchi's particular value. In this section, the 13th-14th century work called the "Wise Debate of an Orphan Boy with the Nine Generals of Genghis" is added. Also within the second section, following the Wise Debate of the Orphan Boy, is another independent work dealing with Genghis Khan's conversations with his Nine Generals which is itself followed by an entire section containing the "Wisdom of Genghis". The second major section ends with the chapters of the Secret History dealing with the last deeds and death of Genghis Khan. The third and last section of the Altan Tobchi includes a very brief chronicle of the Yuan dynasty followed by an account of the Northern Yuan dynasty till its fall in 1634. The third section is followed by a brief summary of the Golden Summary, a statement of the author's identity and an eloquent prayer directed to the "spirits of the Khans descended from mighty Tengri".

There are multiple versions of Luvsandanzan's magnum opus, one, the "Little" Altan Tobchi, dating to around 1604, the 1634 "Lu" Altan Tobchi, and a later, 1765 "Big" Altan Tobchi. However, no definitive date can be put on the early versions.

The manuscript was translated into English by Charles Bawden in 1955.
