= List of Mongol states =

This is a list of Mongol states. The medieval Mongols and their descendants founded several states in Eurasia, including the vast Mongol Empire and its successor states. This list is arranged chronologically while also reflecting the development of different dynasties.

== List of states ==
Mongol Empire
| Mongol Empire | 1206–1368 | 24,000,000 km^{2} | Avarga (1206–1235); Karakorum (1235–1260); Khanbaliq (1260–1368) |
Yuan dynasty
| Yuan dynasty | 1271–1368 | 14,000,000 km^{2} (1310) | Khanbaliq (Dadu, Beijing) |
| Northern Yuan | 1368–1635 | 5,000,000 km^{2} (1550) | Shangdu (1368–1369); Yingchang (1369–1370); Karakorum (1371–1388) |
| Khalkha Khanates (Northern Yuan subject by 1635) | late 16th century–1691 | | Tüsheet Khan, Zasagt Khan, Setsen Khan and Altan Khan of the Khalkha |
Golden Horde (Turco-Mongol)
| Golden Horde | 1240–1502 | 6,000,000 km^{2} (1310) | Sarai |
| Uzbek Khanate | 1428–1471 | | |
| Khanate of Kazan | 1438–1552 | | |
| Crimean Khanate | 1441–1783 | | Chufut-Kale |
| Qasim Khanate | 1452–1681 | | |
| Kazakh Khanate | 1465–1822 | | Saraishyq, Tashkent, Turkestan |
| Great Horde | 1466–1502 | | Sarai |
| Khanate of Sibir | 1468–1598 | | |
| Nogai Horde | 1480–1634 | | |
Chagatai Khanate (Turco-Mongol)
| Chagatai Khanate | 1225–1340s | 3,500,000 km^{2} (1310) | Almaliq; Qarshi |
| Moghulistan | 1340–1462 | | |
| Timurid Empire | 1370-1507 | 4,400,000 | Samarkand (1370–1405; 1447–1459) Herat (1405–1447; 1459–1507) |
| Kara Del Khanate | 1383–1513 | | |
| Turpan Khanate | 1487–1660? | | |
| Yarkent Khanate | 1514–1705 | | |
| Mughal Empire | 1526–1857 | 4,000,000 km^{2} (1700) | Agra (1526–1571); Fatehpur Sikri (1571–1585); Lahore (1585–1598); Agra (1598–1648); Shahjahanabad/Delhi (1648–1857) |
Ilkhanate
| Il Khanate | 1256–1335 | 3,750,000 km^{2} | Maragha (1256–1265); Tabriz (1265–1306); Soltaniyeh (1306–1335) |
| Chobanid dynasty | 1335–1357 | | Tabriz |
| Jalayirid dynasty | 1335–1432 | | Baghdad (Till 1411); Basra (1411–1432) |
| Arghun dynasty | 1479–1554 | | Kandahar (1479–1522) Bukkur (1522–1554) |
| Tarkhan dynasty | 1554–1591 | | Thatta |
Oirats
| Four Oirat | 1399–1634 | 1,000,000 km^{2} (15th – late 16th) | |
| Dzungar Khanate | 1634–1758 | 3,500,000–4,000,000 km^{2} | Ghulja |
| Khoshut Khanate | 1642?–1717 | ~1,400,000 km^{2} | |
| Kalmyk Khanate | 1630–1771 | | |

== See also ==
- History of Mongolia
- List of heads of state of Mongolia
- List of Mongol rulers
- Timeline of Mongolian history

== Bibliography ==
- Andrews, Peter A. (1999). Felt tents and pavilions: the nomadic tradition and its interaction with princely tentage, Volume 1. Melisende. ISBN 1-901764-03-6.
- Janhunen, Juha (2003b). "Para-Mongolic". In Janhunen, J. (ed.). The Mongolic languages. pp. 1–29, 391–402.
