= Secret History of the Mongols =

13th-century Mongolian literary work

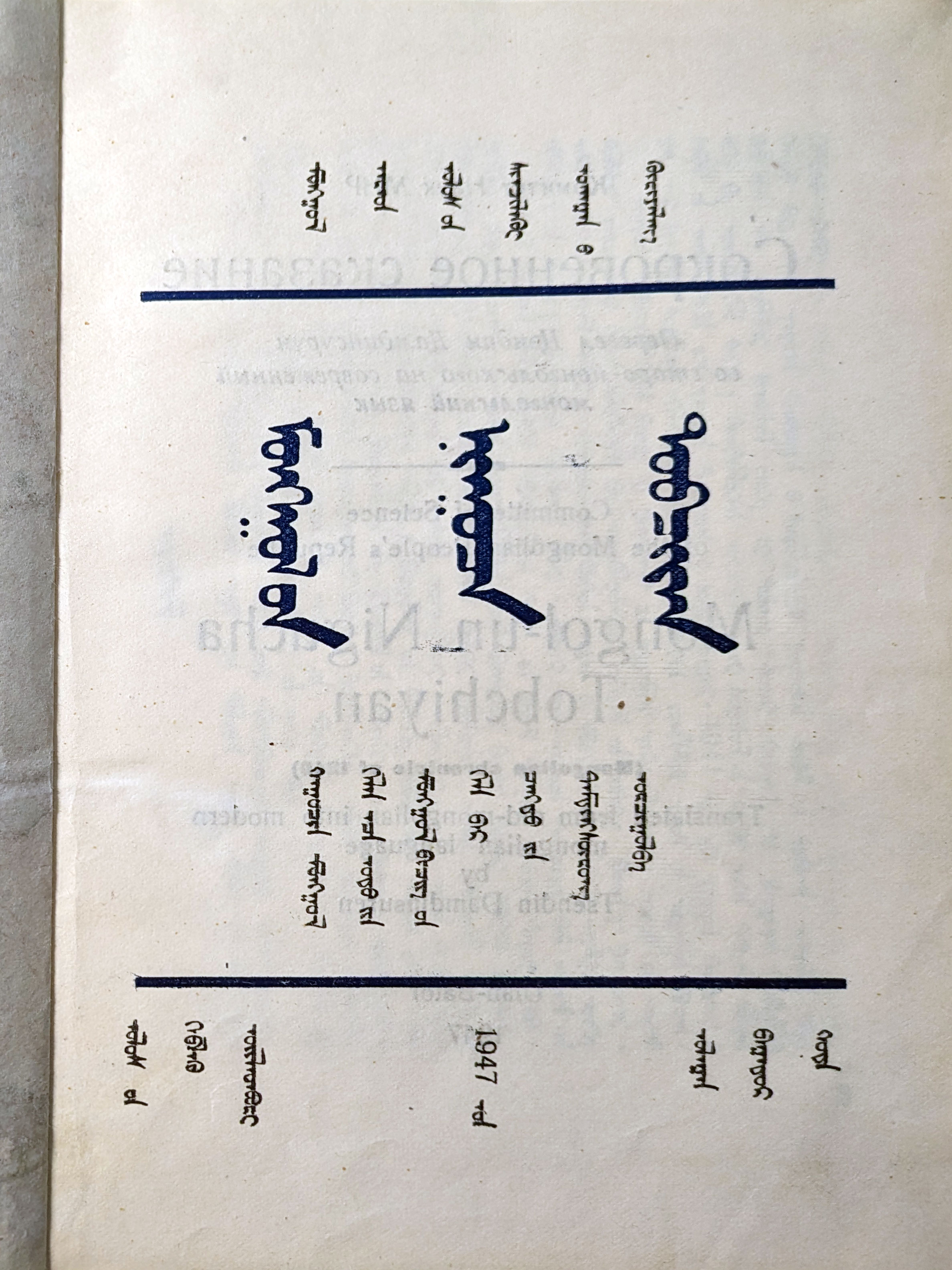
- 1947 edition in modern Mongolian script, translated by Tsendiin Damdinsüren
- Author: Unknown
- Original title: ᠮᠣᠩᠭᠣᠯ ᠤᠨ ᠨᠢᠭᠤᠴᠠ ᠲᠣᠪᠴᠢᠶᠠᠨ
- Language: Middle Mongolian
- Subject: History of the Mongol Empire
- Publication date: Disputed
- Publication place: Mongol Empire

The Secret History of the Mongols (Note: Mongolian script: ᠮᠣᠩᠭᠣᠯ ᠤᠨ ᠨᠢᠭᠤᠴᠠ ᠲᠣᠪᠴᠢᠶᠠᠨ; Cyrillic script: Монголын нууц товчоо; Latin script: Mongoliin nuuts tovchoo; IPA: [mɔɴɢɜ̆ɮíɴ nʊ́ːt͡sʰ tʰɞɸt͡ɕʰɔ́]) is the oldest surviving literary work in the Mongolic languages. Written for the Mongol royal family some time after the death of Genghis Khan in 1227, it recounts his life and conquests, and partially the reign of his successor Ögedei Khan.

The author is unknown and wrote in the Middle Mongol language using Mongolian script. The date of the text is uncertain, but the colophon to the text describes the book as having been finished in the Year of the Mouse, on the banks of the Kherlen River at Khodoe Aral, corresponding to an earliest possible figure of 1228.

While the Secret History was preserved in part as the basis for a number of chronicles such as the Jami' al-tawarikh, Shengwu qinzheng lu, and Altan Tobchi, the full Mongolian body only survived from a version made around the 15th century at the start of the Ming dynasty, where the pronunciation was transcribed into Chinese characters as a tool to help interpreters under the title The Secret History of the Yuan Dynasty (Chinese: 元朝秘史; pinyin: Yuáncháo Mìshǐ). About two-thirds of the Secret History also appear in slightly different versions in the 17th-century Mongolian chronicle Altan Tobchi (lit. 'Golden Chronicle') by Lubsang-Danzin.

The Secret History is regarded as the single most significant native Mongol account of Genghis Khan. Linguistically, it provides the richest source of pre-Classical Mongol and Middle Mongol. The Secret History is regarded as a piece of classic literature in both Mongolia and the rest of the world, and has been translated into more than 40 languages.

== Content ==
The work begins with a semi-mythical genealogy of Genghis Khan, born Temüjin. According to legend, a blue-grey wolf and a fallow doe begat the first Mongol, named Batachiqan. Eleven generations after Batachiqan, a widow named Alan Gua was abandoned by her in-laws and left with her two boys Bügünütei and Belgünütei. She then bore three more sons with a supernatural glowing man who came in through the smoke-hole at the top of the ger. The youngest of Alan Gua's three divinely-born children was Bodonchar, founder of the Borjigin. The description of Temüjin's life begins with the kidnapping of his mother, Hoelun, by his father Yesügei. It then covers Temüjin's early life following his birth around 1160; the difficult times after the murder of his father; and the many conflicts against him, wars, and plots before he gains the title of Genghis Khan in 1206. The latter parts of the work deal with the campaigns of conquest of Genghis and his third son Ögedei throughout Eurasia; the text ends with Ögedei's reflections on what he did well and what he did wrong.

== Value ==
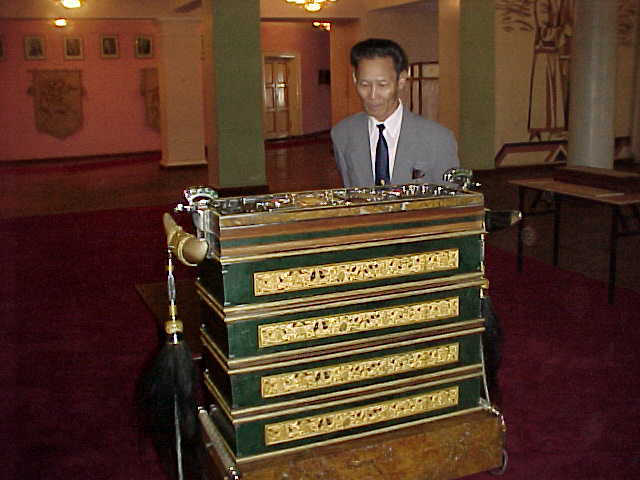
A copy of The Secret History of the Mongols in the Government building in Ulaanbaatar, Baldandorjiin Sumiyabaatar pictured

Scholars of Mongolian history consider the text hugely important for the wealth of information it contains on the ethnography, language, literature and varied aspects of the Mongol culture. In terms of its value to the field of linguistic studies, it is considered unique among the Mongol texts as an example free from the influence of Buddhism prevalent in later texts. It is especially valued for its vivid and realistic depictions of daily tribal life and organization of Mongol civilization in the 12th and 13th centuries, complementing other primary sources available in the Persian and Chinese languages.

Its value as a historically accurate source is more controversial: whereas some experts, such as René Grousset, assess it positively in this regard as well, others, such as Igor de Rachewiltz, believe that the value of the source lies primarily in its "faithful description of Mongol tribal life", and Arthur Waley considered the Secret History's "historical value almost nil".

In 2004 the Government of Mongolia decreed that a copy of The Secret History of the Mongols covered with golden plates was to be located to the rear part of the Government Palace in Ulaanbaatar.

== Scholarship ==
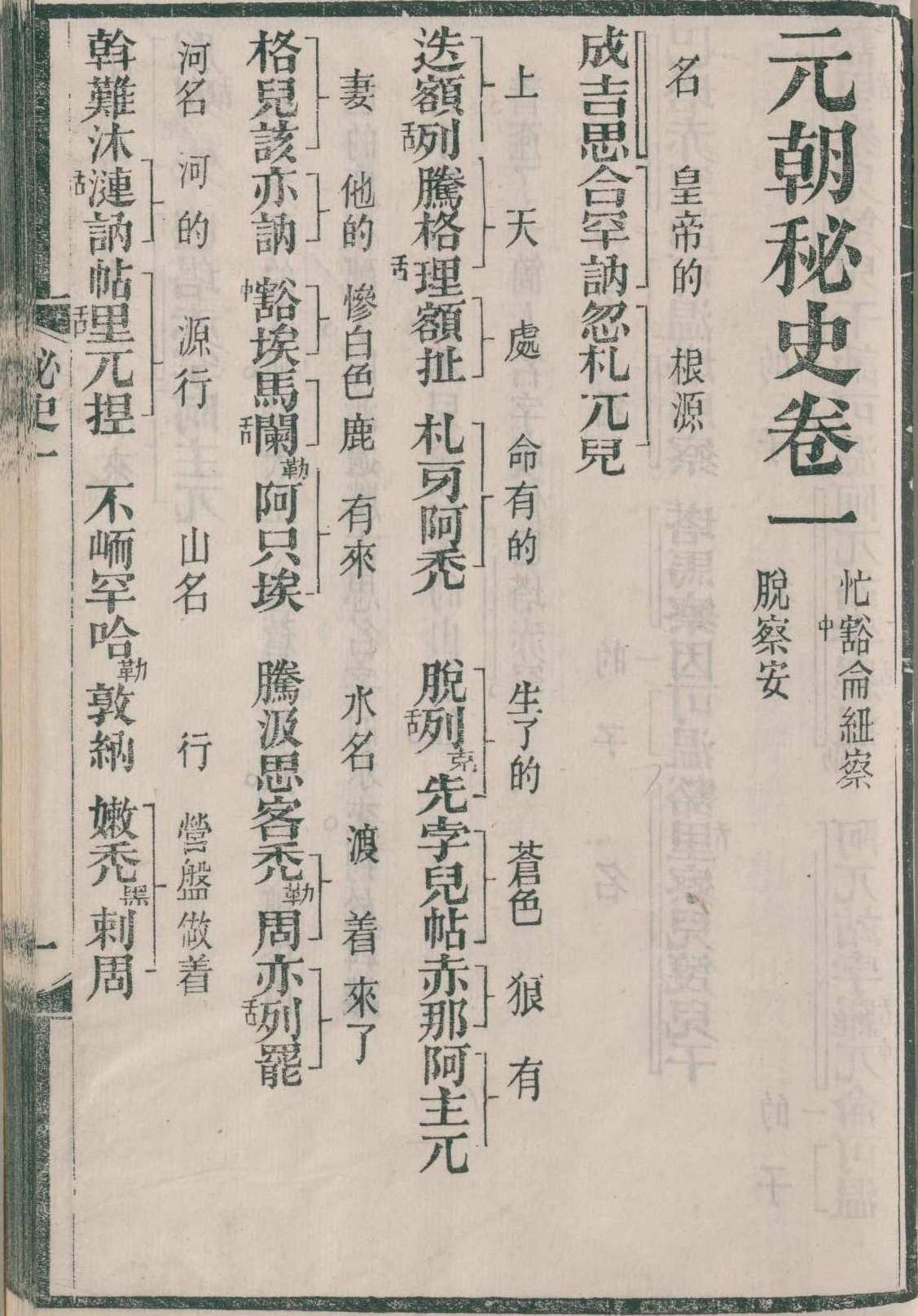
Initial pages of the Secret History published in 1908 by Ye Dehui. The rows with large characters represent Mongolian phonetic transcription in Chinese characters, with the right-hand smaller characters representing the glosses

The Secret History ends with a colophon stating its original date of completion at Khodoe Aral:

The writing of this book was completed at the time when the Great Assembly convened and when, in the Year of the Rat, in the month of the Roebuck, the Palaces were established at Dolo’an Boldaq of Köde'e Aral on the Kelüren River, between Šilginček and [...]

— translation by Igor de Rachewiltz, Section 282

The original text corresponding to this date has not survived to the present day. The Year of the Rat in question has been conjectured to be 1228 (Cleaves, Onon), 1229 (Rachewiltz), 1240, 1252 (Atwood), and 1264 (Hung). Proponents of the earlier dates argue that portions of the work whose events post-date the Year of the Rat were added at a later date. This is however disputed by some including Atwood, arguing that thematic elements and chronology posits that the text was always intended to lead up to, and including, the reign of Ögedei Khan. The month of the Roebuck corresponds to the seventh lunar month, i.e. middle of summer.

Some scholars beginning with Naka Michiyo have argued that this original work was shorter and titled The Origin of Chinggis Khan (Chinggis Qan-u ujaɣur) – corresponding to the first words of the text.

The common name of the work as it is referred to today is The Secret History of the Mongols, corresponding to the edited work compiled in the late 14th century with the Chinese title Secret History of the Yuan (元秘史; Yuán mìshǐ) and the Mongolian title Mongɣol-un niɣuča tobčiyan, re-transcribed from Chinese (忙豁侖紐察脫卜察安; Mánghuòlún Niǔchá Tuōbǔchá'ān—the 卜 is not included in the Chinese-transcribed titles of the copies known today, but that may be the result of a corruption).

This title was altered to Secret History of the Yuan Dynasty (元朝秘史; Yuáncháo bìshǐ) when it was included as part of the Yongle Encyclopedia. While modern definitive versions are all based on these Ming-era copies, various partial copies of the text have been found in Mongolia and Tibet (Tholing Monastery). The most notable of these is the Altan Tobchi (Mongolian: ᠯᠤ᠋ ᠠᠯᠲᠠᠨ
ᠲᠣᠪᠴᠢ), an expanded Mongolian Buddhist-influenced narrative written in 1651 and discovered in 1926 that contains two-thirds of the Secret History verbatim.

=== Hanlin Academy text ===
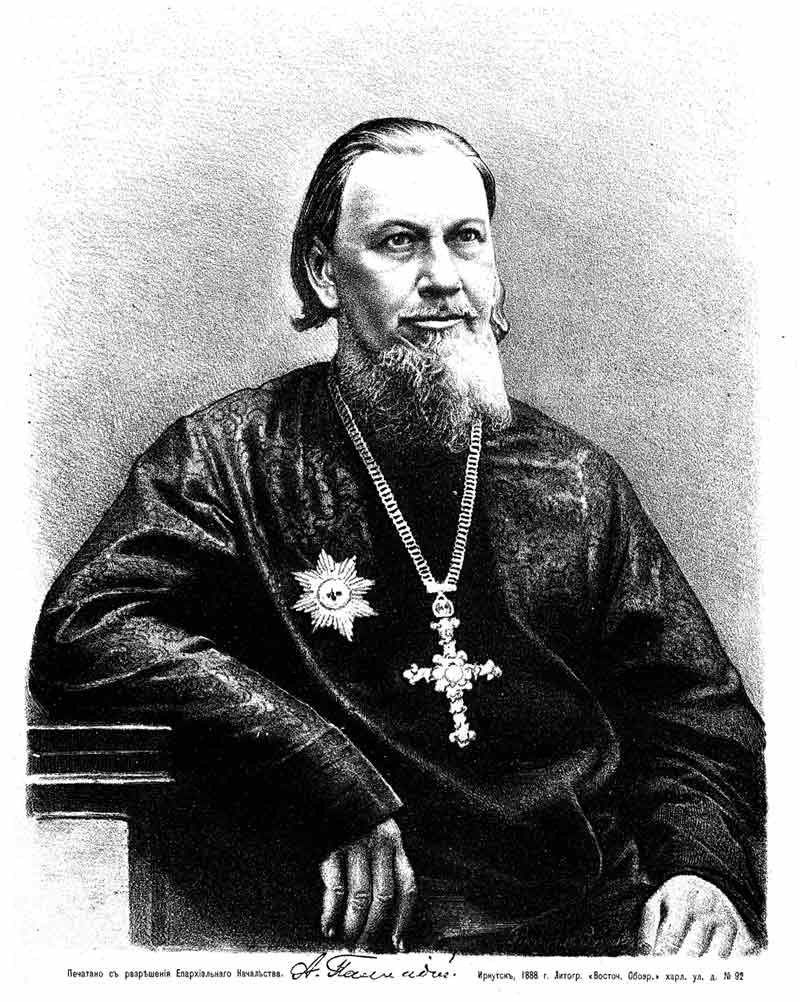
Palladius, a Russian monk who was the first to translate the work into a foreign language

The Ming-era text was compiled at the Hanlin Academy as an aid to help interpreters learn Mongolian, consisting of three parts: a transcription of the Mongolian pronunciation in Chinese characters; an interlinear gloss in Chinese; and a running, often abridged translation into Chinese. Due to this work's compilation almost a century after the original, it has been noted that the Mongolian transcriptions would likely reflect the pronunciation of the then-Mongols in Beijing, rather than the original Middle Mongol of Genghis Khan's era. This text, divided according to length into 12 parts and 282 sections, was eventually folded into the Yongle Encyclopedia as a 15-part work in 1408. The original 12-part work was also published around 1410 in Beijing. After the fall of the Ming and rise of the Qing dynasty these texts began to be copied and disseminated. The oldest dated full copy is of the 12-part version in 1805 by Gu Guangqi (1766–1835), kept in the National Library of China. A copy of the 15-part version was made by Bao Tingbozh (1728–1814) around the same time, and this copy is kept by Saint Petersburg State University. A version based on the 1805 text was published in 1908 by Ye Dehui, with subsequent scholarship collating this and other partial copies of the Secret History of the Yuan Dynasty to high accuracy.

=== Altan Tobchi ===
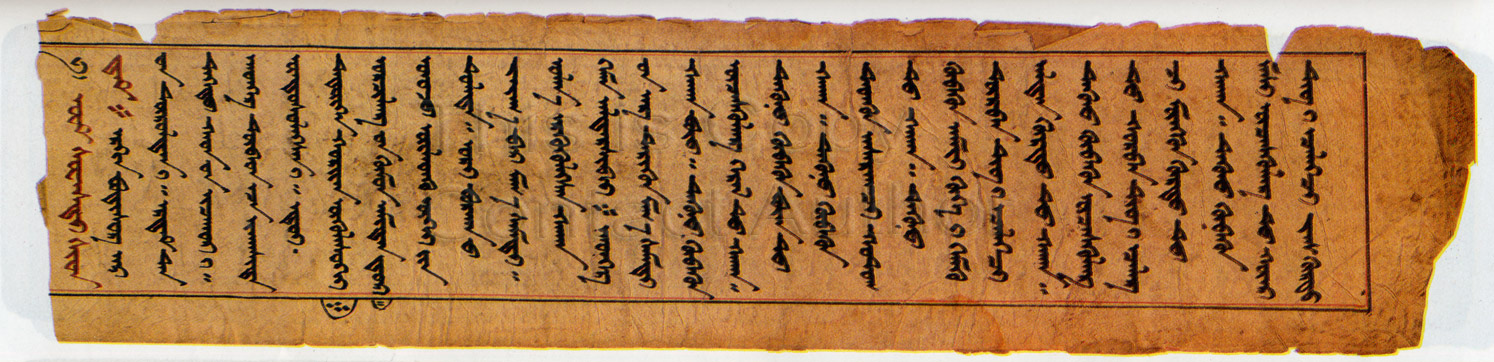
Initial pages of the 1604 edition of the Altan Tobchi

After the disintegration of the Mongol Empire, the Mongols retreated to form the Northern Yuan, and a cult of worship formed around the image of Genghis Khan as a supernatural being amidst a decline in literacy. This resulted in works such as the Chinggis Qaan-u Altan Tobchi (lit. 'Golden Chronicle of Genghis Khan') containing an apocryphal image of the Khan that replaced the semi-historical narrative of the Secret History. Starting in the late 16th century, Tibetan Buddhism gained a foothold amongst the Mongols, and an increase in literacy resulted in a new Altan Tobchi being created by an unknown author in the 1620s. This Altan Tobchi included the earlier parts of the Secret History and combines it with the earlier apocryphal legend cycle. In 1651, the monk Lubsang-Danzin expanded this narrative (now usually called the Lu Altan Tobchi after the author) and included a full two-thirds of the Secret History. This was discovered in 1926 by Duke Jamiyan from Dornod, as part of the academic and cultural revival in the Mongolian People's Republic.

== Translations ==
The Secret History has been translated into over 40 languages. In foreign scholarship, Russian monk and sinologist Palladius was the first to offer a translation of the abridged Chinese running translation in 1866 while serving as the head of the Russian Orthodox mission in Beijing. Using Bao Tingbo's copy, he also attempted an unpublished transcription of the phonetic Mongolian in 1872–78. Japanese historian Naka Michiyo published a translation in 1907. The first reconstructions of the Mongolian text were done by the German sinologist Erich Haenisch in 1937, with a translation published in 1941 (second edition 1948). Russian scholar Sergei Kozin published a separate reconstruction and translation in 1941, while French scholar Paul Pelliot worked on a full reconstruction and translation into French that was published posthumously in 1949. The latter two scholars had access to the Lu Altan Tobchi as a contributing source. B. I. Pankratov published a translation into Russian in 1962.

=== Mongolian ===
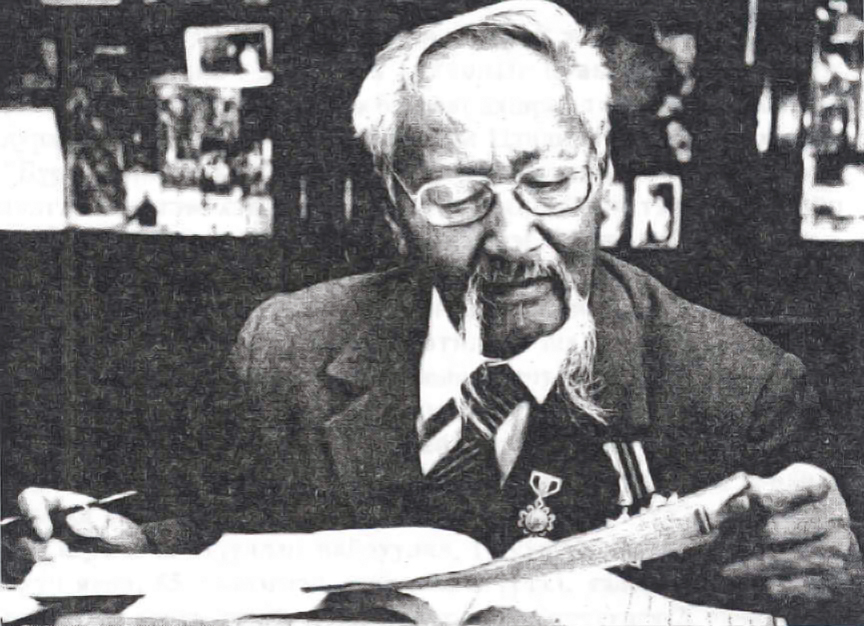
Tsendiin Damdinsuren, author of the 1947 adaptation into modern Mongolian

Duke Tsengde (1875–1932) was the first native Mongolian scholar to attempt a reconstruction of The Secret History, in 1915–17, though it was published only posthumously in 1996. Tsengde's son Eldengtei and grandson Ardajab continued this work and published a translation in 1980 in Hohhot.

The Inner Mongolian authors Altan-Ochir and Bokekeshig independently published reconstructions of the text in Kailu in 1941 as part of the national revival in Mengjiang. The most influential adaptation of the work into modern Mongolian was completed by Tsendiin Damdinsüren in 1947 using Mongolian script, a subsequent version in Mongolian Cyrillic was published in 1957 and is considered a classic of modern Mongolian literature.

=== English ===
In the English language Arthur Waley was the first to publish a translation of the Secret History's running Chinese in 1963, while the first full translation into English was in 1982 by Francis Woodman Cleaves, titled The Secret History of the Mongols: For the First Time Done into English out of the Original Tongue and Provided with an Exegetical Commentary. The archaic language adopted by Cleaves was not satisfying to all and, between 1972 and 1985, Igor de Rachewiltz published a fresh translation in eleven volumes of the series Papers on Far Eastern History accompanied by extensive footnotes commenting not only on the translation but also various aspects of Mongolian culture, which was published as a two-volume set in 2003. In 2015 this was republished as an open access version omitting the extensive footnotes of the original. The Daur Mongol scholar Urgunge Onon published the first translation into English by a native Mongolian in 1990, based on a 1980 Inner Mongolian version by Eldengtei. This was republished as The Secret History of the Mongols: The Life and Times of Chinggis Khan in 2001. A further English translation by Christopher P. Atwood was published in 2023.
