= Brenda Louie =

Chinese-American artist (b. 1953)

- Born: 1953 (age 72–73); Guangdong province, China
- Education: California State University, Sacramento, Stanford University
- Occupation: Visual artist
- Known for: Painting, installation art

Brenda Louie (born 1953) is a Chinese-born American artist, known for her large, painterly abstractions and multimedia installations that explore a variety of subject matter, including migration, cultural hybridity, and Eastern philosophy. Louie has also been a longtime professor of studio art at California State University Sacramento, and has taught painting and drawing at California State University, Stanislaus, American River College, Sacramento, University of California, Davis, San Francisco Art Institute, and Stanford University.

== Early life ==
Louie was born in 1953, in a remote village in Guangdong province, China. She escaped the Great Chinese Famine when she was eight years old, traveling with her grandmother by foot to the southern coast, where they took a boat to Hong Kong in order to be reunited with her father, who had escaped the Maoist regime several years earlier. She later traveled to the United States in the 1970s to attend college, and settled in Northern California.

Louie's artistic talents were nurtured when she was a child by her father, Chiu Sheung Lui, who was an artist, calligrapher, and musician. Chinese calligraphy in particular was essential to her later artistic development.

== Education ==
Louie initially graduated with a degree in economics from California State University, Sacramento (1982) but returned to the university several years later to study art, receiving a master's degree in painting and drawing in 1991. She went on to receive a MFA degree from Stanford University, where she trained with noted artist Nathan Oliveira. In addition to studio art, Louie studied Taoism at California State University, Sacramento and Chinese philosophy, specifically the writings of Mencius, with scholar Philip J. Ivanhoe while at Stanford University.

== Painting style ==
Much of Louie's work is autobiographical. Her own experiences of migration and a continuous cross-pollination of aesthetics and cultures are often expressed as layered forms, calligraphic gestures, mathematical or cartographic symbols, and/or collaged imagery. Universal issues such as life cycles, and death and mourning also figure into her work. Frequently working in series or large-scale installations, Louie seeks to create immersive experiences for the viewer.

Artist and scholar Chris Daubert notes that "Louie's paintings and installations embody and encompass these many strands of her cultural, familial, and personal histories. In several early works, the relationship between the personal calligraphic style of Huaisu and American abstract expressionist muscularity becomes apparent." In a 1993 exhibition review appearing in the visual arts magazine Art View, critic Randal Davis describes the "sheer visceral impact" of Louie's formal elements and "map making" of the "affective dimension" of her "intercultural experiences."

== Notable exhibitions ==
- Annual Crocker-Kingsley Exhibition, Crocker Art Museum (1993; 1995)
- Artists Valentines, Richard. L. Nelson Gallery, University of California, Davis, California (1995)
- California Abstraction, Biola University Art Gallery, La Mirada, California (1997)
- West Coast Painting and Sculpture, Oceanside Art Museum, Oceanside, California (1997)
- The Book of Zero, Richard L. Nelson Gallery, University of California, Davis (2004) (Solo)
- Shanghai International Art Fair (2005)
- Cycle of Life Part III, Ningbo University, Ningbo, China (2007) (Solo)
- Cycle of Life Part IV, Institute for East Asian Studies Gallery, University of California, Berkeley, California (2008) (Solo)
- Brenda Louie: Flower Series, Library Annex Gallery, California State University Sacramento (2009) (Solo)
- Brenda Louie: Going Forward, Looking Back, Library Annex Gallery, California State University Sacramento (2015) (Retrospective)
- Poetry is Not a Luxury, Center for Book Arts, Manhattan (2019)

== Public collections ==
- University of California, Davis, Davis, California, United States
- California State University, Sacramento, Sacramento, California, United States
- Crocker Art Museum, Sacramento, California, United States
- China Academy of Art, Hanghzhou, Zhejiang, China
- Ningbo University, Ningbo, Zhejiang, China
