= Craig Clunas =

Alistair Craig Clunas (born 1 December 1954, Aberdeen, Scotland) is Professor Emeritus of History of Art at the University of Oxford. As a historian of the art and history of China, Clunas has focused particularly on the Ming Dynasty (1368–1644).

== Life ==
Clunas attended Aberdeen Grammar School from 1959 to 1972, which was followed by a Diploma with Distinction in spoken and written modern Chinese from the Peking Languages Institute in Beijing. He next studied Chinese Studies at King's College, Cambridge, as an undergraduate, graduating with a BA (First Class Honours) in 1977 from the University of Cambridge. Afterwards, he went to the School of Oriental and African Studies (SOAS) at the University of London, where he wrote his PhD dissertation on Injanasi's "Nigen Dabqur Asar": a Sino-Mongolian novel of the 19th century (completed 1983) under the supervision of Charles Bawden.

Clunas began his scholarly career at the Victoria and Albert Museum, where for 15 years he was on the curatorial staff and was responsible for the installation of new Chinese galleries. In 1994, he moved to the University of Sussex, where he became Professor of History of Art in 1997. In 2003, he returned to SOAS where he was the Percival David Professor of Chinese and East Asian Art from 2004.

He took up the position of the University of Oxford's Professor of the History of Art in 2007, becoming - as with all previous holders of the Professorship - a fellow of Trinity College. He was the first holder of the Chair in the History of Art to specialise in art from Asia.

He retired from the role in 2018, becoming Professor Emeritus of the History of Art, University of Oxford. He served as Visiting Professor of Chinese Art at Gresham College in London in 2017-18, delivering a series of lectures.

He has contributed to radio programmes including In Our Time with Melvyn Bragg and A History of the World in 100 Objects with Neil MacGregor.

== Publications ==
Clunas has published extensively on early modern China, his books include:

- Superfluous Things: Material Culture and Social Status in Early Modern China (1991)
- Fruitful Sites: Garden Culture in Ming Dynasty China (1996)
- Pictures and Visuality in Early Modern China (1997)
- Art in China (1997; 2009)
- Elegant Debts: The Social Art of Wen Zhengming, 1470–1559 (2004)
- Empire of Great Brightness: Visual and Material Cultures of Ming China, 1368–1644 (2007), based on his lectures as Slade Professor of Fine Art at Oxford in 2004
- Screen of Kings: Royal Art and Power in Ming China (2013)
- (ed., with Harrison-Hall, Jessica), Ming: 50 years that changed China, 2014 (exhibition catalogue), British Museum Press, ISBN 9780714124841
- Chinese Painting and its Audiences (Princeton University Press, 2017)
