= James T. C. Liu =

Chinese historian (1919–1993)

- Born: December 19, 1919; Shanghai, Jiangsu, Republic of China
- Died: September 30, 1993 (aged 73); Lawrenceville, New Jersey, U.S.
- Education: Tsinghua University; Yenching University; University of Pittsburgh (PhD)
- Scientific career
- Fields: Chinese history
- Workplaces: University of Pittsburgh; Stanford University; Princeton University

Chinese name
- Traditional Chinese: 劉子健
- Simplified Chinese: 刘子健
Transcriptions
Standard Mandarin
- Hanyu Pinyin: Liú Zǐjiàn
- Wade–Giles: Liu^{2} Tzu^{3}-chien^{4}

Liu Zichen (December 19, 1919 – September 30, 1993), better known as James T. C. Liu, was a Chinese historian and a leading scholar of Song dynasty history. He held academic posts at Stanford University (1960–1965) and Princeton University (from 1965). He was considered "one of the world's pre-eminent specialists" on the Song Dynasty, with a special interest in Ouyang Xiu.

== Early life ==
Having grown up in Shanghai, China he went to Beijing to study first at Tsinghua, and then at Yenching University, where he came under the influence of the sinologist William Hung. He was twice arrested by the forces of the Japanese military occupation, and was tortured during his second interrogation. After the Second Sino-Japanese War he focused on international relations, and served as historical consultant at the International Military Tribunal for the Far East. Thereafter he went to study in the United States, obtaining his Ph.D. at the University of Pittsburgh, where he was involved in the establishment of Pittsburgh's East Asian Program.

== Career ==
Finding the pain of his experiences during the war years to be too much, Liu moved away from the study of 20th century international relations, and focused his attention on the history of the Song dynasty. Liu wrote book-length biographies of intellectual figures of the Song dynasty like Ouyang Xiu and Wang Anshi, as well as articles examining the political history of the era.

His major work in the field was his monograph China Turning Inward, which claimed that China withdrew from the world stage at the beginning of the twelfth century. A synthesis of many of his ideas developed in previous articles, the book argues that political and intellectual changes occurred while the Song court struggled against the invading Jurchen in southern China that set the stage for the victory of the so-called Neo-Confucianism associated with Zhu Xi. Liu focused on the rule of Emperor Gaozong, the founder of the Southern Song. Gaozong employed eleven chief councillors during his reign, sometimes two at a time, until he settled on Qin Hui, who took control of the bureaucracy for sixteen years until his death. This set the stage for continuing autocratic rule and the subsequent alienation of the literati that lead to the rise of Zhu Xi and his followers, whose thought became an orthodoxy.

Liu served as a bridge between scholars from China, Japan, and the West, and was described by his collaborator Peter Golas as the "foremost champion of international scholarly cooperation" in the field of Song studies. Reflecting this, a festschrift on Song history dedicated to Liu on his 70th birthday was edited by Kinugawa Tsuyoshi and featured articles in English, Japanese, and Chinese.

== Death ==
After suffering from cancer for many years, Liu died at his home in Lawrenceville, New Jersey.

== Selected works ==
- Reform in Sung China: Wang An-shih (1021-1086) and His New Policies (1959)
- Ou-yang Hsiu: An Eleventh-Century Neo-Confucianist (1967)
- Political Institutions in Traditional China: Major Issues (1974)
- China Turning Inward: Intellectual-Political Changes in the Early Twelfth Century (1988)
