= Francis Woodman Cleaves =

American sinologist, linguist and historian (1911–1995)

Francis Woodman Cleaves At Harvard

Francis Woodman Cleaves (born in Boston in 1911 and died in New Hampshire on December 31, 1995) was an American sinologist, linguist, and historian who taught at Harvard University, and was the founder of Sino-Mongolian studies in America. He is well known for his translation of The Secret History of the Mongols.

== Career ==
Cleaves received his undergraduate degree in Classics from Dartmouth College, and then enrolled in the graduate program in Comparative Philology at Harvard, but transferred to the study of Far Eastern Languages under Serge Elisséeff in the mid-1930s, prior to the formal establishment of the department.

In 1935, on a fellowship from the Harvard-Yenching Institute, Cleaves went first to Paris, where he studied Mongolian and other Central Asian languages with the Sinologist Paul Pelliot for three years, then to Beijing where he studied with the Mongolist Antoine Mostaert S.J. Always an avid book collector, he also roamed the stalls and shops in Liulichang, the street for books and antiques. There he accumulated an extensive collection not only in Chinese and Mongolian, his own interests, but also in Manchu, which he did not plan to use himself. The books in Manchu were particularly rare and form the core of Harvard's Manchu collection.

Cleaves returned to Harvard in 1941 and taught Chinese in the Department of Far Eastern Languages as well as worked on the Harvard-Yenching Institute Chinese-English dictionary project. In the following year he received his Ph.D. with a dissertation entitled “A Sino-Mongolian Inscription on 1362,” and offered Harvard’s first course on the Mongolian language. Cleaves enlisted in the United States Navy and served in the Pacific. After the war ended, he helped to relocate Japanese citizens who had lived in China back to Japan and sorted through the books they left behind to find those suitable for shipping to the Harvard-Yenching Library.

In 1946, Cleaves returned to Harvard and proceeded to teach Chinese and Mongolian, without interruption, for the next thirty-five years. He is unique for being the only professor in the history of the department never to take a sabbatical. He trained his students in the traditional European sinology of his mentors. Among his best-known disciples were Joseph Fletcher, the distinguished Mongolist and historian, and Elizabeth Endicott-West, author of basic studies on the Yuan dynasty and History of Mongolia.

Cleaves had an especially close relation with William Hung, a preeminent scholar who had become his friend and mentor when they met in China in the 1930s. A mutual friend recalled that Cleaves was "an old-fashioned gentleman perhaps more at home with his cows, horses, and fellow farmers in New Hampshire than with the academic intrigues of Cambridge," while Hung was a "pragmatic Confucianist." The two would meet every weekday at three to sip tea and perhaps read from the Chinese classics or dynastic histories. Cleaves introduced Hung to the Mongol histories, and Hung published several articles in this field. Hung's article on the Secret History of the Mongols, however, drew conclusions which Cleaves did not feel were correct. Out of respect for his friend, Cleaves did not publish his own translation until 1985, after Hung's death.

Cleaves was renowned for his meticulously annotated translations of Chinese and Old Mongolian texts, and consistently emphasized literal philological accuracy over aesthetic beauty. He published over seventy books and articles, many of which were on bilingual Sino-Mongolian stele inscriptions from the thirteenth and fourteenth centuries. His largest project was a complete annotated translation of the Secret History of the Mongols, of which only the first volume was ever published. In order to give readers the flavor of the original, Cleaves restricted the vocabulary to words used in Elizabethan English, a decision which made the text hard for some readers to comprehend. In 1984, Paul Kahn published a translation based on Cleaves but using contemporary English.

A deeply committed teacher, Cleaves reluctantly retired in 1980, and continued his scholarship on Mongolian history. Much of his work, including notes on the remaining sections of the Secret History and manuscripts for dozens of additional articles, remained unpublished at the time of his death in 1995.

== Major publications ==
- Cleaves, Francis Woodman (1982). The Secret History of the Mongols. Cambridge, Massachusetts: Published for the Harvard-Yenching Institute by Harvard University Press. ISBN 0674796705. 2 vols.
- Antoine Mostaert and Francis Woodman Cleaves. Manual of Mongolian Astrology and Divination. (Cambridge, Massachusetts: Harvard University Press, Scripta Mongolica, 1969).
- Cleaves, Francis Woodman. 1954. "A Medical Practice of the Mongols in the Thirteenth Century". Harvard Journal of Asiatic Studies 17 (3/4). Harvard-Yenching Institute: 428–44. doi:10.2307/2718323.
