= Jay L. Garfield =

American professor of philosophy

Jay Lazar Garfield (born 13 November 1955) is an American professor of philosophy who specializes in Tibetan Buddhism. He also specializes on the philosophy of mind, cognitive science, epistemology, metaphysics, philosophy of language, ethics, and hermeneutics. He is currently the Doris Silbert Professor in the Humanities and Professor of Philosophy, Logic and Buddhist Studies at Smith College, professor of philosophy at the University of Melbourne, visiting professor of philosophy and Buddhist studies at Harvard Divinity School, and Adjunct Professor of Philosophy at the Central University of Tibetan Studies.

== Academic career ==
Garfield received an A.B. from Oberlin College in 1975, and a Ph.D. from the University of Pittsburgh in 1986, where he worked with Wilfrid Sellars and Annette Baier. At the Central University of Tibetan Studies in India, he studied Nagarjuna with Geshe Yeshe Thabkhas.

He taught from 1980 to 1995 at Hampshire College, from 1996 to 1998 at the University of Tasmania, and since 1999 at Smith College.

He is editor-in-chief of the journal Sophia, and is on the editorial boards of Philosophical Psychology, Journal of Indian Philosophy and Religion, Australasian Philosophical Review, Philosophy East and West, American Institute of Buddhist Studies/Columbia Center for Buddhist Studies/Tibet House, Stanford Encyclopedia of Philosophy, and the Journal of Buddhist Philosophy.

Garfield was the inaugural Kwan Im Thong Hood Cho Temple Professor of Humanities and Head of Studies, Philosophy, at Yale-NUS from 2013-2016. He said, "This Professorship has given me the opportunity of a lifetime – working with motivated, creative and talented students and colleagues and working in a community committed to building something entirely new, an Asian liberal arts college with a truly global curriculum." During his professorship at Yale-NUS, Garfield was one of six scholars who participated in a conference with the 14th Dalai Lama on "Mapping the Mind: A Dialogue between Modern Science and Buddhist Science."

He was elected a Fellow of the Australian Academy of the Humanities in 2026.

== Controversy over "If Philosophy Won't Diversify" ==
Garfield has long been a critic of what he sees as the narrow approach of Western philosophers. He has noted that "people in our profession are still happy to treat Western philosophy as the 'core' of the discipline, and as the unmarked case. So, for instance, a course that addresses only classical Greek philosophy can be comfortably titled 'Ancient Philosophy,' not 'Ancient Western Philosophy,' and a course in metaphysics can be counted on to ignore all non-Western metaphysics. A course in Indian philosophy is not another course in the history of philosophy, but is part of the non-Western curriculum." Because of his knowledge of Buddhism and commitment to encouraging the study of Asian philosophy, Garfield was invited to be the keynote speaker at a conference on non-Western philosophical traditions organized by graduate students in philosophy at the University of Pennsylvania in 2016. However, he was "outraged" that there were only "one or two" members of the regular faculty in the department who attended the event, because he felt that this showed a lack of support for their own students' interest in non-Western philosophy.

Garfield discussed this issue with another speaker at the conference, Bryan W. Van Norden, and they wrote an editorial that appeared in The Stone column of The New York Times in May of that year, entitled "If Philosophy Won't Diversify, Let's Call It What It Really Is." In this editorial, they state: "we have urged our colleagues to look beyond the European canon in their own research and teaching." However, "progress has been minimal." Consequently, so long as "the profession as a whole remains resolutely Eurocentric," Garfield and Van Norden "ask those who sincerely believe that it does make sense to organize our discipline entirely around European and American figures and texts to pursue this agenda with honesty and openness. We therefore suggest that any department that regularly offers courses only on Western philosophy should rename itself 'Department of European and American Philosophy.'"

The article received 797 comments in just 12 hours. (None of the other Stone columns that month had over 500 comments.) Garfield later explained, "I woke up to all this email in my inbox [with] people asking, 'Are you okay?' 'Do you need to talk?'" Garfield soon realized that his colleagues were expressing concern for his well-being because so many of the comments on the article expressed "vitriolic racism and xenophobia. And some of it was clearly by philosophers and students of philosophy.'" One typical comment was that Western philosophy deserves precedence because "there is a particular school of thought that caught fire, broke cultural boundaries, and laid the foundation of modern science (Does anyone want to fly in a plane built with non-western math?) and our least oppressive governmental systems." On the other hand, there were also many supportive comments: "Hear! Hear! Inclusion is the order of the day. ... More wisdom from more perspectives — what could be better? We have so much to learn from each other, if only we listen."

Garfield and Van Norden's article was almost immediately translated into Chinese, and over twenty blogs in the English-speaking world have commented or hosted discussions, including Reddit. Garfield and Van Norden's piece has continued to provoke strong reactions. Some have applauded their call for greater diversity in the US philosophical canon. In addition, their piece has been featured in several recent essays arguing for greater diversity in philosophy.

However, there has also been extensive criticism of the Garfield and Van Norden article. Articles in Aeon and Weekly Standard argued that "philosophy" is, by definition, the tradition that grows out of Plato and Aristotle, so nothing outside that tradition could count as philosophy. Professor Amy Olberding of the University of Oklahoma wrote a detailed reply to critics of Garfield and Van Norden, arguing that criticisms fall into a stereotypical pattern that betrays a fundamental misunderstanding of the issues.

== Publications ==
=== Books ===
- Subject as Freedom: A Contemporary Translation (translation and commentary, with Nalini Bhushan, of Krishnachandra Bhattacharyya's 1930 treatise) (Oxford University Press, 2025)
- Losing Ourselves: Learning to Live without a Self (Princeton University Press 2022)
- Buddhist Ethics: A Philosophical Exploration (Buddhist Philosophy for Philosophers) (Oxford University Press 2022)
- Dignāga’s Investigation of the Percept: A Philosophical Legacy in India and Tibet (with Douglas Duckworth, David Eckel, John Powers, Yeshes Thabkhas and Sonam Thakchöe, Oxford University Press 2016)
- Moonpaths: Ethics in the Context of Conventional Truth (with the Cowherds, Oxford University Press 2015)
- Engaging Buddhism: Why Does Buddhism Matter to Philosophy? (Oxford University Press 2015)
- Sweet Reason: A Field Guide to Modern Logic, 2nd Edition (with James Henle and Thomas Tymoczko. Wiley. (2011)
- Western Idealism and its Critics. Central University of Tibetan Studies Press, Sarnath, India, 2011, English only edition, Hobart: Pyrrho Press 1998.
- Moonshadows: Conventional Truth in Buddhist Philosophy (with the Cowherds, Oxford University Press. (2010)
- An Ocean of Reasoning: Tsong kha pa’s Great Commentary on Nāgārjuna’s Mūlamadhyamakakārika (with Geshe Ngawang Samten), Oxford University Press, 2006.
- Empty Words: Buddhist Philosophy and Cross-Cultural Interpretation. Oxford University Press, New York, 2002.
- Translator and commentator, Fundamental Wisdom of the Middle Way: Nāgārjuna's Mūlamadhyamakakārikā. Oxford University Press, New York, 1995.
- Cognitive Science: An Introduction (with N. Stillings, M. Feinstein, E. Rissland, D. Rosenbaum, S. Weisler, and L. Baker-Ward). Bradford Books/MIT Press, 1987; 2nd edition (with N. Stillings, M. Feinstein, E. Rissland, D. Rosenbaum, S. Weisler, and L. Baker-Ward), Bradford Books/MIT Press, 1995.
- Belief in Psychology: A Study in the Ontology of Mind. Bradford Books/MIT Press, 1988.

=== Edited collections ===
- Madhyamaka and Yogācāra: Allies or Rivals? (ed., with J Westerhoff), Oxford University Press, 2015.
- The Moon Points Back: Buddhism, Logic and Analytic Philosophy (ed. With Y. Deguchi, G. Priest and K. Tanaka). Oxford University Press, 2015
- Contrary Thinking: Selected Papers of Daya Krishna (with N Bhushan and D Raveh), Oxford University Press (2011).
- Indian Philosophy in English: Renaissance to Independence (with N Bhushan), Oxford University Press (2011).
- Oxford Handbook of World Philosophy (with W Edelglass), Oxford University Press (2010).
- Pointing at the Moon: Buddhism, Logic Analysis (with T Tillemans and M D’Amato), 2009, Oxford University Press.
- TransBuddhism: Translation, Transmission and Transformation (with N Bhushan and A Zablocki) 2009, the University of Massachusetts Press.
- Buddhist Philosophy: Essential Readings (with William Edelglass) 2009, Oxford University Press.
- Foundations of Cognitive Science: The Essential Readings. Paragon House, New York, 1990.
- Meaning and Truth: Essential Readings in Modern Semantics (with Murray Kiteley). Paragon House, New York, 1990.
- Modularity in Knowledge Representation and Natural Language Understanding. Bradford Books/MIT Press, 1987.
- Abortion: Moral and Legal Perspectives (with Patricia Hennessey). University of Massachusetts Press, 1984.
