= Altan Tobchi =

17th-century Mongolian chronicle by Guush Luvsandanzan

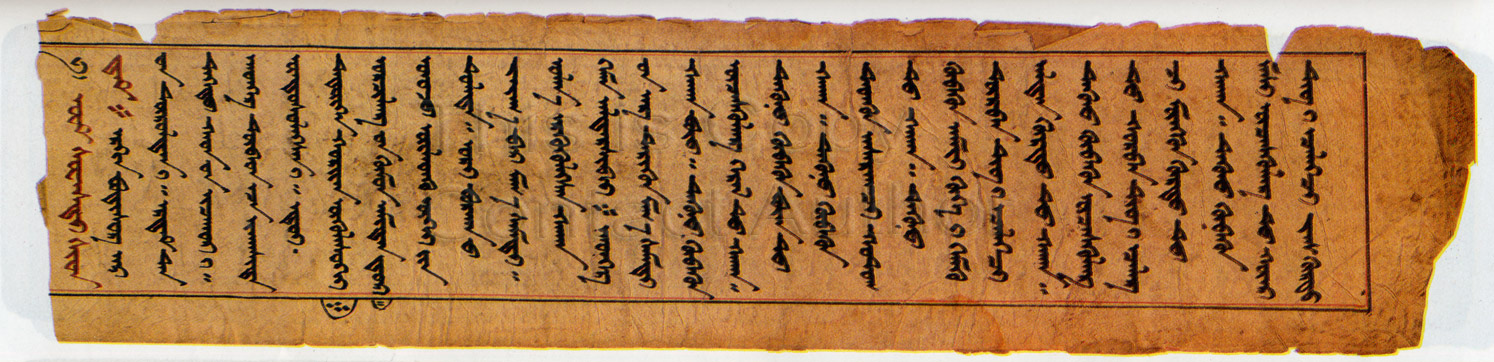
The initial page of the 1604 edition

The Altan Tobchi, (Note: Mongolian: Алтан товч, romanized: Altan tovch, pronounced [áɬtʰə̆ɴ tʰɔw̜t͡ɕʰ]; lit. 'golden summary'; Classical Mongolian: ᠠᠯᠲᠠᠨ ᠲᠣᠪᠴᠢ [ˈaltʰɐ̆n ˈtʰob̥t͡ʃʰɪ̆]) (Note: Full title: Herein is contained the Golden Summary of the Principles of Statecraft as established by the Ancient Khans) also named the Lu Altan Tobchi, (Note: Mongolian: Лу Алтан товч, romanized: Lu Altan tovch, pronounced [ɮʊ‿áɬtʰə̆ɴ tʰɔw̜t͡ɕʰ]; Classical Mongolian: ᠯᠤ ᠠᠯᠲᠠᠨ ᠲᠣᠪᠴᠢ [lu ˈaltʰɐ̆n ˈtʰob̥t͡ʃʰɪ̆]) (Note: Named after its author to distinguish it from previous works with similar titles.) is a 17th-century Mongolian chronicle written by Guush Luvsandanzan. It is generally considered second in dignity to the Secret History of the Mongols as a historical chronicle and piece of classical literature in Mongolia. In fact, the work is special in that it contains 233 of the 282 chapters of the Secret History not only verbatim but with additional detail in certain parts. It is also significant in that it is a major source of knowledge on the "Chingisiin Bilig" or Wisdom of Genghis, a code of ethical conduct specifically directed toward future generations of Mongolian ruling nobility. Duke Jamiyan discovered and brought the original pen copy of the Altan Tobchi to Ulaanbaatar in 1926 from a Taiji (Genghisid prince) called Dari living in Dornod Province, Mongolia. It was studied in depth by Jamsrangiin Tseveen and Byambyn Rinchen, and was translated into English by Charles Bawden in 1955. It is one of the most frequently quoted sources in Mongolian publications.

== Contents ==
The Altan Tobchi is composed of three major sections that differ significantly from each other, but nonetheless woven into a whole in order to meet Luvsandanzan's purpose of providing a summary of Mongolian state ideology at that time. It begins with a mythological genealogy of the descent of Borte Chino, the ancestor of Genghis Khan, from King Mahasammadi of India and various Tibetan rulers like Namri Songtsen (the grandfather of Borte Chino and father of Tengri Khan). This first section is a pious Buddhist attempt to link the Mongol state with the legendary Chakravarti kings. In the next major section the chronicle follows with the 233 chapters of the Secret History interspersed with additional materials that add to the Altan Tobchi's particular value. It is within this second major section that the 13th-14th century work called the "Wise Debate of an Orphan Boy with the Nine Generals of Genghis" is added. Also within the second section, following the Wise Debate of the Orphan Boy, is another independent work dealing with Genghis Khan's conversations with his Nine Generals which is itself followed by an entire section containing the "Wisdom of Genghis". The second major section ends with the chapters of the Secret History dealing with the last deeds and death of Genghis Khan. The third and last section of the Altan Tobchi includes a very brief chronicle of the Yuan dynasty followed by a somewhat detailed account of the Northern Yuan dynasty till its fall with the death of Ligdan Khan in 1634. The third section is followed by a brief summary of the book, a statement of the author's identity and an eloquent prayer directed to the "spirits of the Khans descended from mighty Tengri".

== Purpose ==
Taken as a whole the Altan Tobchi is not a religious text, either of Tibetan Buddhism or of the well-developed shamanic cult of Genghis Khan. It is largely secular and deals with affairs of the state. The Buddhist introduction is irrelevant to the main thrust of the work. It is not a set of laws, although decrees of Genghis Khan are included in the Secret History section. Examples of codified nomadic law exist separately and include the Code of Altan Khan (c. 1577), and the Parchment Laws of the Khalkha (1570s–1639). It is not a simple king list from the legendary Chakravarti kings to Ligdan Khan. Although the title says it deals with "statecraft", the work is not political philosophy nor a treatise concerned with the machinations of the legislative, executive and judicial functions of the state. It does not treat of any state policy in detail (e.g., the relay post system or military strategy). Rather the work is clearly designed to be a manual of ethics for the Mongolian nobility with special emphasis on preserving the unity of the state. The work is essentially didactic and instructional in nature. Its code of conduct is loosely analogous to the Way of the Samurai and chivalry. Although the near entirety of the ethical code contained in the Altan Tobchi is authentically Mongolian or nomadic and thus derives from the sayings of Genghis Khan or nomadic tradition, there are also a few quotations here and there taken from Indian ethical works and Yuan dynasty Tibetan-inspired state ideology (i.e., the Teaching of the Two Orders, of Kublai Khan).

== See also ==
- Altan Debter
- Erdeni Tobchi
