= Bryan W. Van Norden =

American sinologist and translator (born 1962)

Bryan Norden
- Born: 1962 (age 63–64)
- Education: University of Pennsylvania (BA); Stanford University (PhD)

Bryan W. Van Norden (Chinese: 萬百安; born 1962) is an American translator of Chinese philosophical texts and scholar of Chinese and comparative philosophy. He has taught for twenty five years at Vassar College, United States, where he is currently the James Monroe Taylor Chair in Philosophy. From 2017-2020, he was the Kwan Im Thong Hood Cho Temple Professor at Yale-NUS College in Singapore.

== Biography ==
Van Norden's ancestors can be traced back to the 17th century in North America. They fought on both the Loyalist and Revolutionary sides in the American Revolutionary War and served with both the Union and Confederate armies in the American Civil War. Van Norden's father was an officer in the Navy in World War II and was a corporate secretary at Kennametal, an industrial tool company. In high school, Van Norden's interest in China was stimulated by the Kung-fu craze following the success of Bruce Lee's Enter the Dragon in 1973, and the opening of China to the West after the death of Mao Zedong in 1976. He became interested in philosophy while participating in interscholastic debate over the legitimacy of military conscription. In college, he studied both philosophy and Chinese language and culture. Although his interest in Chinese philosophy was discouraged by both philosophers and Sinologists, he decided to pursue Chinese philosophy in graduate school.

Among Van Norden's hobbies are poker, and he has played in the World Series of Poker in Las Vegas.

== Academic career ==
Van Norden received his BA in philosophy from the University of Pennsylvania in 1981. He attended Stanford University on a Mellon Fellowship and was awarded a PhD in philosophy in 1991. Before he joined the faculty at Vassar, Van Norden was a visiting assistant professor at the University of Vermont, and then at the University of Northern Iowa. Van Norden has been on the faculty at Vassar College since 1995, and has served as chair of both the Philosophy Department and the Department of Chinese & Japanese. He has also been a visiting professor at Wuhan University in the spring of 2014 and the summer of 2016. He has been a member of both the Advisory Committee on Non-Western Philosophy and its Committee on the Status of Asian and Asian-American Philosophers and Philosophies of the American Philosophical Association. He is on the editorial board of Notre Dame Philosophical Reviews and the advisory board of the Philosophical Gourmet Report.

Van Norden has been the winner of a number of competitive fellowships and awards. In 2005, he was a Fulbright scholar at Academia Sinica in Taipei, Taiwan. Van Norden was identified as one of the best 300 college or university professors in the US by the Princeton Review. In 2016, Van Norden was one of the winners of the 2016 American Philosophical Association Public Philosophy Op-Ed Contest for his essay, "Confucius on Gay Marriage."

=== Controversy over "If Philosophy Won't Diversify" ===
In May 2016, Jay Garfield and Bryan Norden published an opinion piece in The Stone column of The New York Times, entitled "If Philosophy Won't Diversify, Let's Call It What It Really Is." In this article, they state: "we have urged our colleagues to look beyond the European canon in their own research and teaching." However, "progress has been minimal." Consequently, so long as "the profession as a whole remains resolutely Eurocentric," Garfield and Van Norden "ask those who sincerely believe that it does make sense to organize our discipline entirely around European and American figures and texts to pursue this agenda with honesty and openness. We therefore suggest that any department that regularly offers courses only on Western philosophy should rename itself 'Department of European and American Philosophy.'"

The article received 797 comments in just 12 hours. (None of the other Stone columns that month had over 500 comments.) In response to the controversy, an article was published the next day on the New York Times Editorial Page Editor's blog, summarizing the variety of opinions, pro and con, on this topic. Patricia McGuire, the President of Trinity Washington University, spoke in favor of diversifying philosophy: "Let's face facts: there's a Muslim Mayor in London, signifying the fact that even those who revere All Things British need to catch up with the now-settled reality of great diversity in contemporary life. The canon of learning should reflect that, including Philosophy." However, many readers expressed views similar to the following: "Please preserve us from your political correctness. ...there's a reason that Europe leaped ahead of the rest of the world. I do not believe that we should sacrifice that merely because of an ooshy gooshy need to pretend that all cultures are equally advanced."

Garfield and Van Norden's article was almost immediately translated into Chinese, and over twenty blogs in the English-speaking world have commented or hosted discussions, including Reddit. Garfield and Van Norden's piece has continued to provoke strong reactions. Some have applauded their call for greater diversity in the US philosophical canon. In addition, their piece has been featured in several recent essays arguing for greater diversity in philosophy.

However, there has also been extensive criticism of the Garfield and Van Norden article. Two articles argued that "philosophy" is, by definition, the tradition that grows out of Plato and Aristotle, so nothing outside that tradition could count as philosophy. The editor of the DailyNous blog suggested the following typology of other criticisms of the original article: the philosophical equivalent of the "All Lives Matter" (parts of Anglo-European philosophy are also neglected) criticism, the "Don't Be Presumptuous" (in projecting a Western conception of philosophy onto other cultures) criticism, the "Be More Radical" (by questioning the racist, sexist, and imperialist bases of philosophy in the West) criticism, the "Red Herring" (the canon isn't really the problem with philosophy) criticism, the "Up Periscope" response, and the "Pardon Me, Gentlemen" (but you are ignoring how androcentric Western philosophy is) criticism. Professor Amy Olberding of the University of Oklahoma wrote a detailed reply to critics of Garfield and Van Norden, arguing that criticisms fall into a stereotypical pattern that betrays a fundamental misunderstanding of the issues.

=== Controversy over "The Ignorant Do Not Have a Right to an Audience" ===
In June 2018, Bryan W. Van Norden published an opinion piece in The Stone column of The New York Times, entitled "The Ignorant Do Not Have a Right to An Audience." In the article, Van Norden makes the case against John Stuart Mill's defense of absolute free speech found in his seminal text "On Liberty." Mill's argument, as rendered by Van Norden, amounts to the belief that every opinion someone holds can be categorized either completely true, somewhat true, or completely false, and that even the discussion of patently false beliefs is valuable. Mill believed in the ability of people to distinguish true beliefs from false ones through rational and open discourse with one another. Van Norden contends, contra Mill, that there is no one universal method of rationality that all human beings may learn through proper education. Van Norden disagrees, arguing that if that were the case, people wouldn't believe a radio host when they deny that the mass shooting of Sandy Hook ever happened. Van Norden goes on to argue that the historical situation of the present differs considerably from that of Mill's. In the age of mass media, which seeks to attract the largest audience possible, networks will gravitate towards more controversial figures like former child actor Kirk Cameron, who was allowed to defend on television that we should not believe in evolutionary theory unless biologists can produce a 'crocoduck' as evidence. Van Norden argues that, in contrast, responsible intellectuals like Noam Chomsky or Martha Nussbaum are not platformed to the extent that those who espouse pseudo-scientific talking points are.

Van Norden favourably cites the critique of Mill offered by the Frankfurt School philosopher Herbert Marcuse. However, Van Norden explicitly rejects Marcuse's suggestion that violence may be used to silence ignorant or extremist views. In addition, he rejects outright censorship of such voices on the grounds that Van Norden believes that the exercise of violence is immoral, given that it amounts to acts of terrorism, and also impractical, given that the very nature of the Internet is such as to serve as a network of information that can't be blocked. Instead, Van Norden advocates a distinction between free speech and what he terms "just access." According to Van Norden, access to the public through institutions is a finite resource and thus, its allocation is a question of justice. Justice dictates that access be granted to opinions and people based on merit and benefit to the community. Van Norden argues just access is about institutions being mindful about the access to audiences they grant certain people and their ideologies, and should take into account both the former and the latter. For example, when Jenny McCarthy's anti-vaccination beliefs get platformed, Van Norden argues, what occurs is not a demonstration of open-mindedness, but rather, a suggestion that such views are worthwhile to debate and discuss. Van Norden disagrees, declaring that such views are, in fact, rooted in ignorance and while people like McCarthy have a right to free speech that should not be violated through the exercise of violence or censorship, that does not equate to a right to an audience afforded to her by institutions such as the media. This point for Van Norden, is what crucially distinguishes free speech from just access.

Van Norden's essay received one thousand eighty-four comments on the New York Times website. The American Philosophical Association would award Van Norden's essay their Public Philosophy Op-Ed prize for 2019. The newspaper Florida Today ran an article favorably citing Van Norden's article titled "Donald Trump presents a new challenge for fair news coverage", written by Ross McCluney. In the article, McCluney claims that being fair and balanced ultimately means not platforming opinions we know to be false.

However, Van Norden's piece was also subject to controversy and criticism. Most notably, Van Norden's quotation and criticism of Jordan Peterson provoked responses from a variety of publications. Peterson himself accused Van Norden on Twitter of misrepresenting what he said. The online publication Campus Reform published an article written by Toni Airaksinen recounting the incident, provocatively titled "Prof cherry-picks Jordan Peterson quotes for hit piece." The article defended Peterson, claiming that Van Norden misunderstood Peterson's statements about men having no respect for someone they can't physically fight. Airaksinen argues that Peterson was not referring to relationships men have with women, but rather, the relationships that men have with other men. Conversely, the progressive "The Majority Report with Sam Seder" uploaded a segment defending Van Norden's article and airing the video where Peterson made the remarks that Van Norden appropriated for his essay. Also defending Van Norden's opinion piece was Professor of Writing Katja Thieme in an article for Pyriscence titled "Jordan Peterson and Citational Practice." In her article, Thieme accused Peterson of insufficiently engaging the literature and thinkers associated with postmodernism, Marxism, etc., which he routinely criticizes. Thieme also defended Van Norden's quoting and paraphrasing of Peterson, stating that she verified the quotes herself and the paraphrasing was well within bounds.

Beyond the Peterson debacle, criticisms were levied against Van Norden for his critique of John Stuart Mill's conception of free speech. Philosopher Massimo Pigliucci wrote for his blog Footnotes to Plato, a blog post titled "Should the ignorant be denied access to audiences?" Pigliucci questions how we are to reasonably and adequately determine what views and which proponents of them are to be afforded just access? Since, as Pigliucci points out, Van Norden rejects the notion of universal reason, such questions as the communal benefits of receiving certain opinions and the differing degree of merit among views, make such inquiries fall into a realm of arbitration. Other critics went even further than Pigliucci in their criticism of Van Norden's essay. Liam Warner, writing for the conservative publication National Review in an article titled "If You’re Going to Oppose Free Speech, Please Do It Properly," wrote that Van Norden's piece is a continuation of the Left's dissociation from the tradition of classical liberalism of which John Stuart Mill is a part. Warner argues that Van Norden makes the distinction that, while Mill invoked free speech to argue for unpopular Progressive ideas, such as abolition of slavery and women's suffrage, today, free speech is invoked to suppress progressive ideas and to saturate audiences with conservative ones. This, according to Warner, demonstrates that the Left of today is not committed to free speech as a formal principle the way that classical liberals and the Right are today. A blogger under the pseudonym "Winston Smith" wrote a blog post criticizing Van Norden for rejecting absolute free speech; Smith uses an argument similar to the one made by Pigliucci, namely, that what the Left defines as racist, sexist, etc., is a matter of arbitration, and that by arguing that institutions controlled by the Left should decide which ideas are valuable or tolerable, Van Norden is encouraging political correctness.

== Publications ==
- Classical Chinese For Everyone:A Guide For Absolute Beginner. Indianapolis: Hackett Publishing, 2019.
- Foreword written by Jay L. Garfield.Taking Back Philosophy: A Multicultural Manifesto. New York: Columbia University Press, 2017.
- Co-edited with Justin Tiwald. Readings in Later Chinese Philosophy: Han to the 20th Century. Indianapolis: Hackett Publishing, 2014.
- Introduction to Classical Chinese Philosophy. Indianapolis: Hackett Publishing, 2011.
- Translator, The Essential Mengzi: Selected Passages with Traditional Commentary. Indianapolis: Hackett Publishing, 2009.
- Translator, Mengzi: With Selections from Traditional Commentaries. Indianapolis: Hackett Publishing, 2008.
- Virtue Ethics and Consequentialism in Early Chinese Philosophy. New York: Cambridge University Press, 2007.
- Co-edited with Philip J. Ivanhoe, Readings in Classical Chinese Philosophy. Second ed. Indianapolis: Hackett Publishing, 2005.
- Editor, Confucius and the "Analects": New Essays. New York: Oxford University Press, 2001.
- Editor, The Ways of Confucianism by David S. Nivison. Chicago: Open Court Press, 1996. Chinese translation published as 儒家之道 : 中国哲学之探讨 (Nanjing : Jiangsu renmin chubanshe, 2006).
