= The Stone (blog) =

Online philosophy series

- Website type: Online philosophy series
- Available in: English
- Creators: Peter Catapano, Simon Critchley
- Editors: Peter Catapano, Simon Critchley
- Website: www.nytimes.com/column/the-stone
- Launched: May 2010; 16 years ago
- Current status: Online

The Stone was the New York Times philosophy series, edited by the Times opinion editor Peter Catapano and moderated by Simon Critchley. It was established in May 2010 as a regular feature of the New York Times opinion section, with the goal of providing argument and commentary informed by or with a focus on philosophy. The series, as described on the Times website "features the writing of contemporary philosophers and other thinkers on issues both timely and timeless." More than a dozen of the essays in the series have been chosen as winners of the American Philosophical Association's public op-ed contests. Works from the series have been collected into two volumes—"The Stone Reader: Modern Philosophy in 133 Arguments" and "Modern Ethics in 77 Arguments," both published by Liveright.

Over the years, many essays published in the series have won the American Philosophical Association Public Philosophy Op-ed Prize, including four of the five winners in 2020. The New York Times announced in May 2021 that the series would be ended, as part of a rebranding of the editorial page and a move away from labeled columns.

== Contributors ==
- Linda Martin Alcoff
- Louise Antony
- Paul Bloom
- Paul Boghossian
- Tyler Burge
- Judith Butler
- Noam Chomsky
- Alice Crary
- Arthur Danto
- Jay L. Garfield
- Gary Gutting
- Carol Hay
- John Kaag
- Philip Kitcher
- Rae Langton
- Ernie Lepore
- Peter Ludlow
- Michael P. Lynch
- Michael Marder
- Jeff McMahan
- Feisal G. Mohamed
- Alva Noe
- Martha Nussbaum
- Steven Pinker
- Peter Singer
- Scott Soames
- Jason Stanley
- Bryan W. Van Norden
- Cornel West
- Timothy Williamson
- Edward O. Wilson
- George Yancy
- Santiago Zabala
