= Charles Bawden =

Charles Bawden FBA
- Born: Charles Roskelly Bawden; 22 April 1924; Weymouth, Dorset, England
- Died: 11 August 2016 (aged 92)
- Occupation: Professor
- Awards: Order of the Pole Star

Academic work
- Discipline: Mongolian language
- Institutions: School of Oriental and African Studies
- Notable students: John Man and Craig Clunas
- Notable works: The Mongol Chronicle Altan Tobci, The Jebtsundamba Khutukhtus of Urga, The Modern History of Mongolia

Charles Roskelly Bawden, FBA (22 April 1924 – 11 August 2016) was a professor of the Mongolian language in the School of Oriental and African Studies (SOAS) at the University of London from 1970 to 1984.

== Early years ==
Charles Bawden was born in Weymouth. His father was George Charles Bawden (1891–1963) and his mother was Eleanor Alice Adelaide Russell (1888–1983). Both of his grandfathers had served in the Royal Navy. His parents were schoolteachers, though his mother was required to resign upon marriage. Charles had one older brother, Walter Harry Bawden, who joined the Royal Navy as an engineer cadet before the outbreak of the Second World War. Charles spent Christmas Day 1945 with him aboard his submarine in Hong Kong harbour. Bawden was educated at Weymouth Grammar School. He won a scholarship in Modern Languages at Peterhouse, Cambridge University, but after being awarded a First in Part I of the Medieval and Modern Languages Tripos he was called up for military service.

== Wartime service ==
Bawden joined the Navy in February 1943 as an ordinary seaman. Owing to his linguistic ability he had been selected for Japanese training even before being called up. He was posted to the secret Bedford Japanese School and joined the 4th course (July to December 1943). He proved to be the best student on the course and after he had been commissioned he was sent to the Naval Section at the Government Code and Cypher School, Bletchley Park, where he worked on decrypted Japanese signals. Along with a few of his colleagues, he was later posted to the South East Asia Command, Colombo, where they did similar work at H.M.S. Anderson, a shore-based cryptography station. He arrived in summer 1944 and stayed until December 1945. As he wrote in his draft autobiography:

'We arrived in the summer of 1944, and though the war had only just over a year to run, and our stay lasted only till the month of December 1945, this proved perhaps the most formative period of my life. It was not for us a violent period, but the experience of working on current enemy messages, always incomplete and requiring emendation, the experience, that is, of applying text-critical techniques, learned on the spot, to practical warfare, was something never to be forgotten. It was, too, a period when lifelong friendships were formed. We were a compact and harmonious group of civilians, naval officers and Wrens, and the unique association we formed then has lasted, for some of us, ever since.'

After the end of the war he was sent to Hong Kong, where he supervised Japanese internees who were translating documents for war crimes trials.

I remember very clearly spending some days at the Supreme Court, supervising Japanese internees who were translating depositions for a war crimes trial which was in progress. Even at the time, it seemed to me that this particular trial was a rather dubious procedure, and the verdict a foregone conclusion. I was invited to witness the subsequent hangings, but declined the privilege.

He then went to Japan on a cruiser as part of a Disposal of Enemy Equipment unit. He was based at Kure, the headquarters of the British Commonwealth Occupation Force but this posting did not last long and he returned to the UK.

== Career and scholarship ==
On returning to Cambridge in October 1946, he completed a degree in Modern Languages in 1947. He then spent a year studying Chinese under Professor Gustav Haloun. After a year in the Home Office, he returned to Cambridge with a Treasury Studentship to take up the study of Chinese. He subsequently began work on a PhD in Chinese but by that time his interests had turned to Mongolian, which he had begun studying under Professor Denis Sinor, and he completed his PhD on the Mongolian chronicle Altan Tobchi. In 1955 he was offered a lectureship in Mongolian at SOAS. He made the first of his many visits to Mongolia in 1958. In 1970 he was promoted to Professor of Mongolian and the following year he was elected a Fellow of the British Academy. He resigned the fellowship in 1981 on account of his opposition to the continued membership of Anthony Blunt, who had been exposed as a Soviet spy, but he was reelected in 1985. In 1982 he became Pro-Director of SOAS but he took early retirement in 1984.

He wrote extensively on Mongolian history and literature, and published a Mongolian-English dictionary that is often cited as the most comprehensive available. There is an extensive assessment of his scholarship in his British Academy obituary. Among his students were John Man, Professor Craig Clunas FBA and Prof. Dr. Veronika Veit.

In addition to having been elected a Fellow of the British Academy, he was also awarded the Order of the Pole Star by the Mongolian government. He donated his books to the Ancient India & Iran Trust in Cambridge.

== Personal life ==
On 3 August 1949 Bawden married Jean Barham Johnson: she was the younger sister of Margaret Barham Johnson, who had served in the WRNS in Colombo and had been one of his colleagues there. They had four children. Jean died in 2010. Bawden died on 11 August 2016 at the age of 92.

== Works ==
- The Mongol Chronicle Altan Tobci. Wiesbaden: Otto Harrassowitz, 1955.
- The Jebtsundamba Khutukhtus of Urga; text, translation, and notes. Wiesbaden: O. Harrassowitz, 1961.
- The Modern History of Mongolia. New York: Praeger, 1968.
- Shamans, Lamas, and Evangelicals: The English Missionaries in Siberia. London: Routledge & Kegan Paul, 1985.
- Confronting the Supernatural: Mongolian Traditional Ways and Means. Wiesbaden: Harrassowitz Verlag, 1994.
- Mongolian-English dictionary. London: K. Paul International, 1997.
- Mongolian Traditional Literature: An Anthology. London: Kegan Paul, 2003.
- An eighteenth century Chinese source for the Portuguese dialect of Macao." Silver Jubilee Volume of the Zinbun-Kagaku-Kenkyusyo, Kyoto University, 1954.
- Bawden, Charles (1957). "A First Description of a Collection of Mongol Manuscripts in the University Library, Cambridge". Journal of the Royal Asiatic Society. 4? (3–4): 151–160. doi:10.1017/S0035869X00115801. S2CID 161079136.
- Bawden, Charles (1958). "Two Mongol Texts Concerning Obo-Worship". Oriens Extremus. 5 (1): 23–41.
- Bawden, Charles (1960). "Economic Advance in Mongolia". The World Today. 16 (6): 257–270.
- Bawden, Charles (1960). "Some Recent Work in Mongolian Studies". Bulletin of the School of Oriental and African Studies, University of London. 23 (3): 530–543. doi:10.1017/s0041977x00150591. S2CID 178899765.
- Bawden, Charles (1962). "Calling the Soul: A Mongolian Litany". Bulletin of the School of Oriental and African Studies, University of London. 25 (1/3): 81–103. doi:10.1017/s0041977x00056275. S2CID 162707368.
- Bawden, Charles (1965). "Some Notes on the Horse Policy of the Yuan Dynasty". Central Asiatic Journal. 10 (3–4): 246–268.
- Bawden, Charles (1967). "A Joint Petition of Grievances Submitted to the Ministry of Justice of Autonomous Mongolia in 1919". Bulletin of the School of Oriental and African Studies, University of London. 30 (3): 548–563. doi:10.1017/s0041977x00132045. S2CID 154083800.
- Bawden, Charles (1968). "The Mongol rebellion of 1756–1757". Journal of Asian History. 2 (1): 1–31.
- Bawden, Charles (1969). "A Case of Murder in Eighteenth-Century Mongolia". Bulletin of the School of Oriental and African Studies, University of London. 32 (1): 71–90. doi:10.1017/s0041977x00093708. S2CID 154964787.
- Bawden, Charles (1969). "The Investigation of a Case of Attempted Murder in Eighteenth-Century Mongolia". Bulletin of the School of Oriental and African Studies, University of London. 32 (3): 571–592. doi:10.1017/s0041977x00097081. S2CID 163145008.
- Bawden, C. R. (1970). "Some Documents Concerning the Rebellion of 1756 in Outer Mongolia". Bulletin of the Institute of China Border Area Studies, 1, 1–23.
- Bawden, C. R. (1976). On the Evils of Strong Drink: A Mongol Tract from the Early Twentieth Century. Walther Heissig (Wiesbaden: Harrassowitz), 61.
- Bawden, Charles (1977). "A note on the inscriptions on two Chinese rugs in the Victoria and Albert Museum". Bulletin of the School of Oriental and African Studies, University of London. 40 (3): 586–590. doi:10.1017/s0041977x0004595x. S2CID 194949082.
- Bawden, Charles (1984–85). "The wish-prayer for Shambhala again". Monumenta Serica. 36: 453–510. doi:10.1080/02549948.1984.11731174.
- Bawden, C. R. (1994). "On the Practice of Scapulimancy among the Mongols". Charles R. Bawden, Confronting the Supernatural: Mongolian Traditional Ways and Means. Wiesbaden: Harrazowits Verlag, 111-42.

He has also worked on Encyclopædia Britannica articles.
