= Progressive Confucianism =

Approach to Confucianism that promotes individual and collective moral progress

Progressive Confucianism (Chinese: 进步儒学; pinyin: jìn bù rú xué) is a term of philosophy coined by Stephen C. Angle in his book Contemporary Confucian Political Philosophy: Toward Progressive Confucianism (2012). Progressive Confucianism refers to a contemporary approach of Confucianism that aims to promote individual and collective moral progress. It explores themes such as political authority and morality, the rule of law, human rights, gender and sexuality, bearing similarities with other contemporary progressive social and political movements.

== Origin ==
In 2012, Stephen C. Angle, Professor of Philosophy, and Mansfield Freeman, Professor of East Asian Studies at Wesleyan University, first put forward the idea of Progressive Confucianism as a continuation of the Confucian tradition that accepts the challenges posed by contemporary society. Angle's conception of Progressive Confucianism is built upon the 20th-century intellectual movement of New Confucianism. New Confucian philosopher Mou Zongsan's notion of "self-restriction" (Chinese: 自我坎陷) had a profound influence on Angle, who shares Mou's commitment to liberal democracy and builds upon Mou's idea to develop a framework that goes beyond New Confucianism. Whereas Mou Zongsan did not speak concretely on human rights, Progressive Confucianism upholds human rights and promotes gender equality, pushing forward the anti-oppression and anti-authoritarian regime established by New Confucianism.

Political theorist Leigh Jenco characterizes Progressive Confucianism as something that does not stay at the level of "a disingenuous 'discovery' of [liberal] values in early texts such as Mencius," what Angle and other Progressive Confucians intend for is to "'reconceptualize popular authority in ways that both reflect, yet critically reconstruct, certain Confucian commitments.'"

Progressive Confucians reject the label of ''liberal'' Confucianism. As a school of Confucian political philosophy that shares some liberal values, Progressive Confucianism goes beyond a hybrid of Confucianism and liberalism. People who argue against liberalism in China, for the reason that liberalism was not originated in China, may find Progressive Confucianism appealing. Accordingly, Progressive Confucianism is able to reach a wider audience than liberal Confucianism: both an international audience who cares about Chinese culture and a Chinese audience for internal criticism.

== Doctrine ==
=== Self-restriction ===
''Self-restriction'' (Chinese: 自我坎陷) is an essential notion Angle adopts from Mou Zhongsan to set the overall framework for Progressive Confucianism. In Angle's conception, Mou identifies two kinds of reasoning, one ''ethical and subjective'', serving as "an innate moral consciousness that has the ability to directly intuit the basic moral nature of the cosmos," while the other ''analytical and objective'', operating as "a cognitive, analytical consciousness that works by distinguishing subject from object."^{: 27} One's morality and political values emerge from these two kinds of reasoning, respectively.

Mou is concerned with the prospect that politics would be "swallowed" by morality; He postulated that one's analytical, objective reasoning (which determines one's political view) would be overwhelmed by ethical, subjective reasoning (which cultivates one's personal virtue), as shown by the often occurrence in Chinese history that leaders, who "claim to have highly developed moral insight," inflict their own moral view upon others, leading to unpleasant consequences.^{:24}

As a check on this usurpation by morality, the notion of ''self-restriction'' is therefore endorsed by Mou as an approach in which ethical reasoning, aided by "a certain kind of political structure, 'restricts itself' in order to more fully realize itself, and thereby allows for an independent realm of political value to exist".^{: 28} In particular, as Angle explains, Mou's conception is not that "a constitution, laws, and rights are merely compatible with Confucianism, but are [rather] required by Confucianism if it is to fully realize its own goals."^{: 29}

=== Rule of law ===
Similar to Zhang Shizhao and Mou Zongsan, Angle is also concerned that politics will be “swallowed” by morality. In the classical Confucian society of China, an over-emphasis on morality resulted in absolute moral authority, which gave rise to the oppression that prevented people from cultivating their own moral values. In order for individuals to fully live by Confucian virtues, some objective, public structures (like laws) are needed.

Angle adopts the term ''self-restriction'' to draw a connection between morality and the rule of law. Joseph Chan, a professor of political philosophy at Princeton University explains the idea of self-restriction: "In the sphere of politics, rather than acting according to one’s ethical reasoning and judgment, one 'is bound by laws and works within political processes.'” Thus, Progressive Confucianism takes on the view that "Confucians must be open to, even as their virtues should seek to moderate, the contestation accompanying the world of 'politicians and lawyers.'"

Sor-hoon Tan, Professor of Philosophy at Singapore Management University points out that Confucian ritual (Chinese: 礼) works together with the rule of law and plays a unique role in shaping a harmonious community. Tan notes that "litigation inclines people toward selfishness by requiring them to think in terms of themselves as being opposed to others, thus undermining trust and reducing the chances of harmonious association thereafter." Contrary to laws using "coercive sanctions and punishments," Confucian ritual "operates through transformative influence." In order to achieve the harmonious state desired by Confucianism, the external rule of law and the internal regulation of rituals need to form an organic whole in guiding people's behaviors.

=== Human rights ===
Angle's understanding of Confucian human rights is based on Zhao Tingyang's normative concept of ''all-under-heaven''. "Viewing the world from the perspective of the world…requires us to arrive at the universal world perspective through an inclusive process, rather than universalizing a single perspective.” According to political theorist Leigh Jenco, "such human rights may not come directly or solely from prior Confucian values", thus making room for expanding Confucian virtues and protecting human rights in the Confucian background.

Progressive Confucianism and human rights open up a dialogue between China and the West. Mary Sim, Professor of Philosophy at College of Holy Cross, challenges "the connection between human rights and Western philosophy". Sim argues that a Confucian approach to human rights has both theoretical and practical importance. Compared to the western notion of the state of nature and veil of ignorance thought experiments, the grounding of Confucian human rights is in "real relationships in which we join our lives and the moral communities (beginning with the family) on which our agencies depend." This approach also "promises a fresh assessment of Western claims and priorities".

=== Gender and sexuality ===
Unlike New Confucian scholars such as Jiang Qing, who insist that maintaining traditionally defined gender roles are fundamental to social stability, Progressive Confucianism is open to the notion that some aspects of the Confucian human role may be contingent and flexible. In "Progressive Confucianism and Human Roles," Angle criticizes a one-sided or overly rigid understanding for roles and rationality because "such interpretations fail to capture crucial insights of Confucianism, and they undermine the possibility of Confucianism playing a positive role in the modern world." Progressive Confucianism suggests that a critical and charitable reading of Confucian texts provides a basis for feminist movements and LGBT+ rights.

The fluid nature of yin-yang cosmology may support gender fluidity. Ann Pang-White, Director of Asian studies at The University of Scranton and the editor of The Bloomsbury Research Handbook of Chinese Philosophy and Gender, suggests that "yin-yang cosmology when appropriately understood does not necessarily support a rigid oppositional split of 'femininity/female/women versus masculinity/male/men.' Rather, since all things embrace both yin and yang, all things embody some degree of both femininity and masculinity".

Confucianism has its own reasons to support same-sex marriage. "Based on the premise that homosexual desires are natural" and with "the advancement of reproductive technology" in the modern era, Sin-Yee Chan, Professor of Philosophy at University of Vermont, contends that "homosexual couples can maintain a Confucian family."

== Criticism ==
Criticism of Progressive Confucianism ranges from the etymological to the philosophical. Bao Wenxin, a researcher at Shanghai Academy of Social Sciences, argues that given the layers of meaning embedded in the Chinese word ''progressive'' (进步), the label of Progressive Confucianism may be a vague one. Bao points out that other than Progressive Confucianism, the term ''progressive'' is adopted by other schools of political philosophy, such as conservatism, liberalism and radicalism. In contemporary China, ''progressive/progress'' is predominantly owned by Chinese Marxist philosophy and is a term widely used in the writings of the Chinese Communist Party membership. At first glance, Chinese readers might find it hard to tell what kind of ''progress'' Progressive Confucianism refers to. Conservative Confucians, such as Jiang Qing, push back against Progressive Confucianism's more malleable view of traditions and inclusive nature. Meanwhile, Marxists and supporters of the Chinese Communist Party would object to Progressive Confucianism's support for liberal democracy.
