= David Shepherd Nivison =

American sinologist and historian (1923–2014)

David S. Nivison
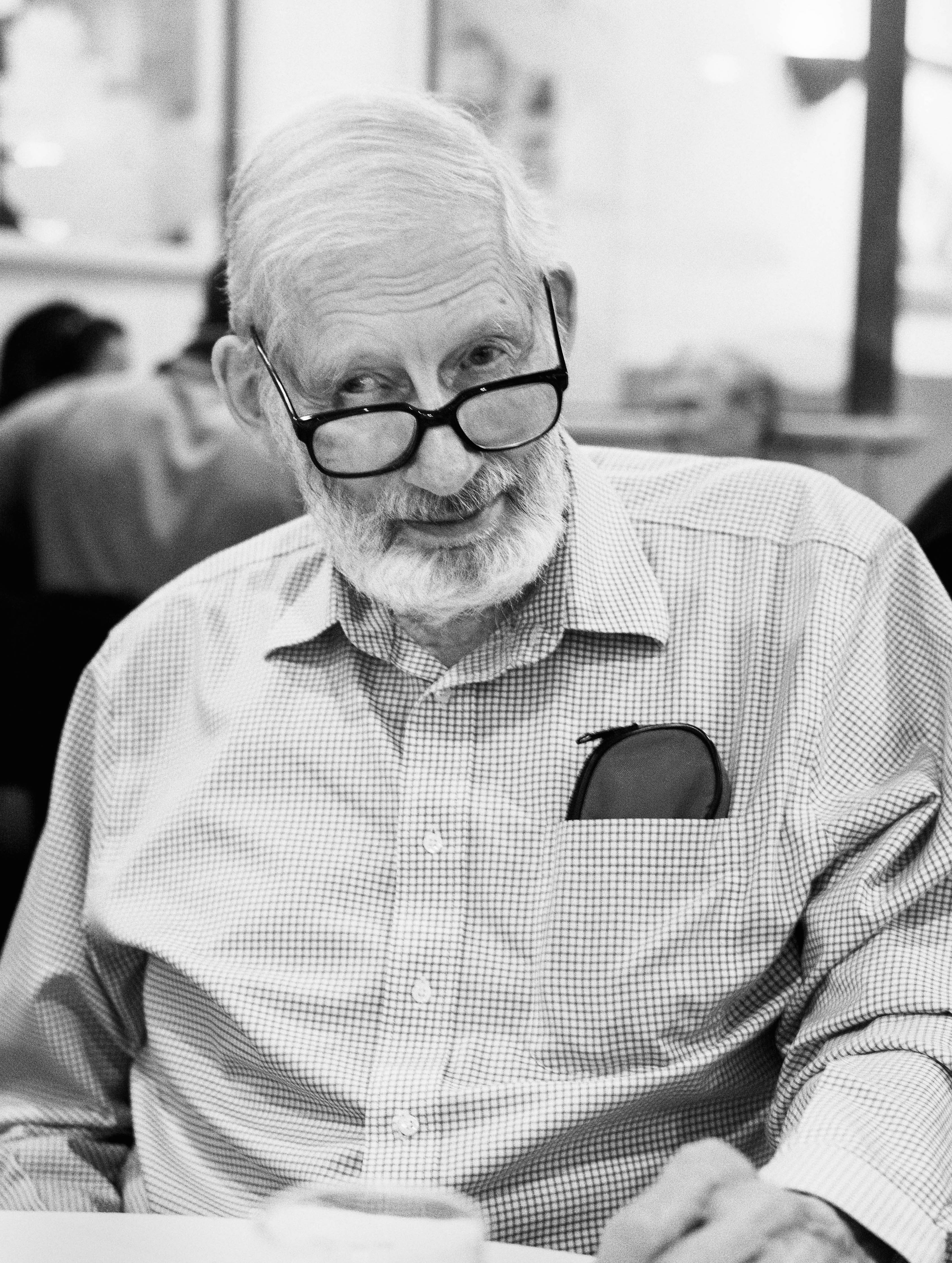
- Nivison in 2012
- Born: January 17, 1923; Farmingdale, Maine, U.S.
- Died: October 16, 2014 (aged 91); Los Altos, California, U.S.
- Education: Harvard University (AB, PhD)
- Known for: Discovery of accurate Zhou dynasty founding date
- Spouse: Cornelia Green (m. 1944; died 2008)
- Scientific career
- Fields: Sinology
- Workplaces: Stanford University (1948-88)
- Academic advisors: John King Fairbank; James Robert Hightower; William Hung; Yang Lien-sheng
- Notable students: Philip J. Ivanhoe, Edward Shaughnessy, Kwong-loi Shun, Bryan W. Van Norden

Chinese name
- Traditional Chinese: 倪德衛
- Simplified Chinese: 倪德卫
Transcriptions
Standard Mandarin
- Hanyu Pinyin: Ní Déwèi
- Wade–Giles: Ni^{2} Te^{2}-wei^{4}

David Shepherd Nivison (January 17, 1923 – October 16, 2014) was an American sinologist known for his publications on late imperial and ancient Chinese history, and philosophy, and for his 40 years as a professor at Stanford University. Nivison is known for his use of archaeoastronomy to accurately determine the date of the founding of the Zhou dynasty as 1045 BC instead of the traditional date of 1122 BC.

== Life and career ==
David Shepherd Nivison was born on January 17, 1923, outside of Farmingdale, Maine. His great-uncle, Edwin Arlington Robinson, was a notable 19th-century American poet and a three-time recipient of the Pulitzer Prize.

Nivison entered Harvard University in 1940, but, like many American men of his generation, his studies were interrupted by World War II. Nivison served in the United States Army Signal Corps as a Japanese translator, where he worked in a group organized by Edwin O. Reischauer. He returned to Harvard after the war's conclusion in 1945, and graduated in 1946 with a Bachelor of Arts degree summa cum laude in Chinese. Nivison stayed at Harvard for graduate studies in Chinese, receiving his Ph.D. in 1953 with a dissertation on 18th-century Chinese philosopher Zhang Xuecheng. He worked with J.R. Hightower, Reischauer and John K. Fairbank, and his first Chinese teachers were Yang Lien-sheng and William Hung, who passed on their deep knowledge of traditional Chinese scholarship and interest in recent Western historiography.

Nivison began teaching at Stanford University in 1948, and eventually held a joint appointment at Stanford in three departments: Philosophy, Religious Studies and Chinese and Japanese. Nivison devoted time and energy in the 1950s to train himself in the field of philosophy. He audited courses at Stanford and spent the academic year 1952-1953 at Harvard, where he audited Willard Van Orman Quine's course on Philosophy of Language. He was chair of the Stanford Philosophy Department 1969-1972, a time of student protests at Stanford, as elsewhere in the world, and spent a night in the department office to protect it from attack. In 1979, the Pacific Division of the American Philosophical Association elected him president. From 1954 to 1955 Nivison was a Fulbright Fellow in Kyoto, Japan, and was a Guggenheim Fellow at Oxford University in 1973. Nivison retired from Stanford in 1988 and was designated professor emeritus.

His doctoral dissertation on Zhang Xuecheng, the neglected Qing dynasty philosopher and historian, was published in 1966 as The Life and Thought of Chang Hsüeh-Ch'eng, 1738-1801, and won that year's Julien Prize. In the field of philosophy, his major contribution is the application of the techniques of analytic philosophy to the study of Chinese thought. In Sinology, one of his contributions has been the effort to precisely date the founding of the Zhou dynasty, based on archaeoastronomy. The traditional date was 1122 BC, but Nivison initially argued that the likely date was 1045 BC, and then eventually suggested that it was 1040 BC. As well as disagreeing with the 1045/6 BC date for the Zhou conquest of Shang, Nivison has also strongly disagreed with most of the dates published by the Chinese government's Xia-Shang-Zhou chronology project.

Nivison died at his home in Los Altos, California, on October 16, 2014, at age 91.

== Major works ==
- The Ways of Confucianism: Investigations in Chinese Philosophy. Edited with an introduction by Bryan W. Van Norden. Chicago: Open Court Publishing, 1996. Chinese translation published as 儒家之道 : 中国哲学之探讨 (Nanjing : Jiangsu People's Publishing House, 2006).
- Nivison, David S. (1953). "The Literary and Historical Thought of Chang Hsüeh-ch'eng, 1738-1801: A Study of His Life and Writing, With Translations of Six Essays from the Wen-shih t'ung-i". Ph.D. dissertation (Harvard University).
- The Riddle of the Bamboo Annals (Zhushu jinian jiemi 竹書紀年解謎), Taipei: Airiti Press, 2009. ISBN 978-986-85182-1-6, a summary by Nivison here.
- Key to the Chronology of the Three Dynasties: The "Modern Text" Bamboo Annals, Philadelphia: Dept. of Asian and Middle Eastern Studies, University of Pennsylvania, 1999. ASIN B0006R6NXK
- Nivison, David S. (1996). Van Norden, Bryan W. (ed.). The Ways of Confucianism : Investigations in Chinese Philosophy. Chicago: Open Court. ISBN 0812693396.
- The Life and Thought of Chang Hsüeh-ch'eng. Stanford: Stanford University Press, 1966. Google Books.
- Communist Ethics and Chinese Tradition. (Cambridge: Center for International Studies, Massachusetts Institute of Technology, 1954). ISBN
- David S. Nivison and Arthur F. Wright, eds. Confucianism in Action. (Stanford, CA: Stanford University Press, Stanford Studies in the Civilizations of Eastern Asia, 1959).
