= Chung-ying Cheng =

American philosopher of Chinese philosophy (1935–2024)

Chung-Ying Cheng
- 成中英
- Born: November 8, 1935; Nanjing, China
- Died: July 2, 2024 (aged 88); Honolulu, Hawaii, U.S.
- Occupations: Philosopher; professor; educator

Education
- Education: National Taiwan University (BA); University of Washington (MA); Harvard University (PhD)

Chung-Ying Cheng (Chinese: 成中英; November 8, 1935 – July 2, 2024) was a Taiwanese-American philosopher specializing in Chinese philosophy. He was a professor of philosophy at the University of Hawaiʻi at Mānoa. He is considered one of the pioneers who formalized the field of Chinese philosophy in the United States in the 1960s.

== Education and career ==
Cheng received his B.A. from National Taiwan University in 1956, his M.A. from University of Washington in 1958, and his Ph.D. from Harvard University in 1963. He joined the Department of Philosophy at the University of Hawaiʻi at Mānoa in 1963. He had lectured at institutions such as Yale University and Oxford University. He also served as Chair of Department of Philosophy and Director of the Graduate Institute of Philosophy at National Taiwan University. Recently, he was Visiting Chair Professor in Chinese Philosophy at King's College London, visiting professor at Peking University and Tsinghua University, Distinguished Chair Professor at Renmin University, and Visiting Chair Professor of Humanities at Shanghai Jiaotong University.

Cheng's research interests were in the areas of Chinese logic, the I Ching and the origins of Chinese philosophy, Confucian and Neo-Confucian Philosophy, the onto-hermeneutics of Eastern and Western philosophy, and Chan (Zen) philosophy. Recently, he had specifically worked on the philosophy of c-management and Confucian Bio-Ethics as they relate to the Chinese tradition, and on how Chinese culture relates to world culture. He founded the Journal of Chinese Philosophy published by Blackwell Publishers in 1973 and served as its editor-in-chief until his death.

== Death ==
On July 2, 2024, he died in Honolulu at the age of 88.

== Books ==
- Cheng, Chung-Ying. (1991). New dimensions of Confucian and neo-Confucian philosophy. Albany, NY: State University of New York Press.
- Cheng, Chung-Ying. (1991). Shiji zhi jiao de jueze: Lun Zhong-Xi zhexue zhong de huitong yuronghe [Choice at the turn of a new century: On the interflux and integration of Chinese and Western philosophy]. Shanghai, China: Zhishi Chubanshe.
- Cheng, Chung-Ying. (1991). Wenhua, lilun yu guanli: Zhongguo xiandaihua de zhexue xingsi [Culture, ethics, and the philosophy of management]. Guiyang: Guizhou Renmin Chubanshe.
- Cheng, Chung-Ying. (1995). C lilun: Yijing guanli zhexue [C Theory: The Yijing philosophy of management]. Taipei, Taiwan: Dongda Tushu Chubanshe.
- Cheng, Chung-Ying. (1999). C Theory: Chinese philosophy of management (in Chinese). Shanghai, China: Xueling Publishers.
- Cheng, Chung-Ying. (2000). Ontology and interpretation (in Chinese). Beijing, China: Sanlian Publishers.
- Cheng, Chung-Ying. (2001). A treatise on Confucian philosophy: The way of uniting the outer and the inner (in Chinese). Beijing, China: China Social Sciences Publishers.
- Cheng, Chung-Ying. (2020). The primary way: Philosophy of Yijing. Albany, New York: State University of New York Press.
- Cheng, Chung-Ying. (2023). The philosophy of change: Comparative insights on the Yijing. Albany, New York: State University of New York Press.

== Edited books ==
- Cheng, Chung-Ying, & Bunnin, Nicholas (Eds.). (2002). Contemporary Chinese philosophy. Malden, Massachusetts: Blackwell.
- Cheng, Chung-Ying, & Zhou, Hanguang. (1997). Light of wisdom: The contemporary application of Chinese management philosophy. Shanghai, China: Chinese Textile University Press.
- Hsiung, James C., & Cheng, Chung-Ying (Eds.). (1991). Distribution of power and rewards: Proceedings of the International Conference on Democracy and Social Justice East and West, 1988. Lanham, Maryland: University Press of America.
- Krijnen, Christian, & Cheng, Chung-Ying (Eds.). (2021). Philosophical methodology in classical Chinese and German philosophy. Nordhausen, Germany: Traugott Bautz.

== Journal articles and book chapters ==
- Cheng, Chung-Ying. (1986). Chinese philosophy in America, 1965-1985: Retrospect and prospect. Journal of Chinese Philosophy, 13(2), 155–165.
- Cheng, Chung-Ying. (1986). On the environmental ethics of the Tao and the Ch’i. Environmental Ethics, 8(4), 351–370.
- Cheng, Chung-Ying. (1986). The concept of face and its Confucian roots. Journal of Chinese Philosophy, 13(3), 329–348.
- Cheng, Chung-Ying. (1987). Logic and language in Chinese philosophy. Journal of Chinese Philosophy, 14(3), 285–307.
- Cheng, Chung-Ying. (1997). Confucianism and modernization. In Hsueh-Li Cheng (Eds.), New essays in Chinese philosophy (pp. 221–231). New York, New York: Peter Lang.
- Cheng, Chung-Ying. (1998). Transforming Confucian virtues into human rights. In Wm Theodore de Bary & Tu Weiming (Eds.), Confucianism and human rights (pp. 142–153). New York, New York: Columbia University Press.
- Cheng, Chung-Ying. (2008). The Yijing as creative inception of Chinese philosophy. Journal of Chinese Philosophy, 35(2), 201–218.
- Cheng, Chung-Ying. (2021). Creative ontology of interpretation: How to understand identity, difference, and harmony in Chinese Philosophy. In Christian Krijnen & Chung-Ying Cheng (Eds.), Philosophical methodology in classical Chinese and German philosophy (pp. 169–188). Nordhausen, Germany: Traugott Bautz.
- Cheng, Chung-Ying. (2022). Chinese principles of human communication: A philosophical outline. In Yoshitaka Miike & Jing Yin (Eds.), The handbook of global interventions in communication theory (pp. 253–265). New York, New York: Routledge.
- Cheng, Chung-Ying. (2022). The I Ching as a symbolic system of integrated communication. In Wimal Dissanayake (Ed.), Communication theory: The Asian perspective (2nd edition, pp. 77–101). Manila, Philippines: Asian Media Information and Communication Center.
