= Avarga =

Steppe in Mongolia; first nomadic capital of the Mongol Empire

- Аварга (Mongolian)
- Location within Mongolia
- 47°05′40″N 109°09′10″E
- Location: Mongolia
- Region: Khentii Province

Avarga, also spelt Abharga (/ˈævərɡə/; Mongolian: Аварга [ˈaw̜r(ə)q]), is the steppe where the first nomadic capital of the Mongol Empire was located after Genghis Khan seized the territory from the Jurkin clan. Avarga was located at the confluence of the Kherlen and Tsenker River, in present-day Khentii Province, Mongolia.

== History ==
The place was originally called Aurag, meaning source in the Mongolian language. Avarga is located near the place where Genghis Khan's family lived. Oral tradition maintains that Börte and other family members continued to live in Avarga during the Mongol invasion of Khorazm (1218–1223). It was a collection and distribution center for goods from around the empire; but it soon proved too small and the Mongol court established the base of Karakorum.

Under Kublai Khan and his successors, it became a shrine for the cult of the Genghis Khan.

A 2020 study concluded that Avarga was Genghis Khan's winter base camp, based on radiocarbon chronology.
