= Philip J. Ivanhoe =

American sinologist

- Born: New Jersey
- Education: Stanford University (BA, PhD)
- Occupation: Sinologist
- Employer: Georgetown University
- Children: 2

Philip J. Ivanhoe (born January 17, 1954) is an American sinologist and historian of Chinese thought, particularly of Confucianism and Neo-Confucianism. He is a professor and chair of the Department of East Asian Languages and Cultures at Georgetown University. Ivanhoe is perhaps best known for two claims: that Neo-Confucian philosophers such as Zhu Xi and Wang Yangming have systematically misinterpreted earlier Confucians such as Confucius himself, and Mengzi; and that Confucianism may usefully be understood as a version of virtue ethics.

== Biography ==
Ivanhoe was raised in New Jersey by parents who owned a variety of small businesses, including a butcher shop, where he worked until leaving for college. He attended Stanford University on a scholarship, where he earned a B.A. (1976) in Philosophy, and also studied Chinese language. From 1976 to 1978, Ivanhoe stayed at Stanford to work with David S. Nivison on a project to generate computerized concordances of Chinese texts. From 1974 to 1978, he served in the United States Marine Corps, PLC and was honorably discharged at the rank of sergeant. From 1978 to 1982, he served in the U. S. Army. He left the army at the rank of sergeant, with an honorable discharge, and returned to Stanford to pursue his doctorate in Religious Studies (awarded 1987), also completing the requirements for a minor in Asian Languages. At Stanford, Ivanhoe studied under Nivison, a leading Sinologist who had applied the methods of analytic philosophy to the study of Chinese thought, and Lee H. Yearley, a scholar of Thomas Aquinas and comparative religion. Upon Nivison's retirement, Ivanhoe was given a joint appointment as an assistant professor in both the Philosophy Department and the Religious Studies Department at Stanford (1991). In 1993, Ivanhoe won the Lloyd W. Dinkelspiel Award for Outstanding Service to Undergraduate Education. In 1996, Ivanhoe was promoted to associate professor. Then in 1998 Ivanhoe moved to the University of Michigan, where he was hired at the associate professor level in the Philosophy Department and the Department of Asian Languages and Cultures. In 2003, Ivanhoe left Michigan and became Findlay Visiting Professor of Philosophy at Boston University. In 2006 he accepted his appointment at City University of Hong Kong. His courses included Feminism and Family Ethics, Philosophy of Life, and Ethics and Practice. In 2018 Ivanhoe moved to Sungkyunkwan University as a Distinguished Chair Professor in the College of Confucian Studies and Eastern Philosophy. He serve as editor in chief of the Journal of Confucian Philosophy and Culture at the Institute of Confucian Philosophy and Cultures and director of a new research center within the College of Confucian Studies and Eastern Philosophy tentatively named the Confucian Institute for East Asian Philosophy (CIEAP).

== Intellectual contributions ==
Ivanhoe was influenced by Nivison's suggestion that Neo-Confucians, although they were harsh critics of Buddhism, were more deeply influenced by Buddhist philosophical concepts than they realized. As a result, Neo-Confucians misinterpreted their own intellectual tradition. Ivanhoe developed Nivison's insight in great detail in his doctoral dissertation, a revised version of which was later published as a book, Ethics in the Confucian Tradition: The Thought of Mengzi and Wang Yangming. In this book, Ivanhoe contrasts the views of the ancient Confucian Mengzi (also known as "Mencius") with that of the Neo-Confucian Wang Yangming on several topics, including "sagehood" and "ethical cultivation," and demonstrates how the influence of Buddhist ideas on Wang leads him to mis-read Mengzi, even when he believes that he is explicating him.

Ivanhoe applied this idea more broadly in his next major book, Confucian Moral Self Cultivation. In the first edition of this book, Ivanhoe argued that Chinese philosophers can be categorized in terms of whether they use a "development," "discovery" or "re-formation" model of ethical cultivation. (Ivanhoe was one of the co-developers of this terminology, along with A.C. Graham, his classmate Kwong-loi Shun, and his student Jon Schofer.) In a development model, ethical cultivation is a process of beginning from innate but incipient tendencies and gradually developing them. (So, for example, the ancient Confucian Mengzi says that "sprouts" of virtue must be cultivated to develop into full virtues.) According to a discovery model, humans have within themselves everything that is necessary for full virtue, but this capacity is somehow impeded or obscured, and cultivation is a process of realizing what is present within oneself. (Ivanhoe argues that Chinese Buddhists and Neo-Confucians, despite their genuine differences on many topics, share a discovery model of ethical cultivation.) Finally, in a re-formation model, human nature is originally resistant to cultivation, and must be laboriously re-shaped in order to create virtue. (Ivanhoe argues that the ancient Confucian Xunzi held such a view.) In the second edition of Confucian Moral Self Cultivation, Ivanhoe further subdivided the types of self-cultivation models.

Ivanhoe's influence on themes such as the virtues, ethical cultivation and human nature reflects the influence of Yearley's view that Confucianism may be understood as a form of virtue ethics. Ivanhoe has co-edited a number of anthologies of secondary essays on Chinese thought, and has published a large number of essays and articles in reference works on Confucianism, Mohism and Daoism.

== Personal life ==
Ivanhoe is married and has two children, a daughter and a son.
