= Eastern philosophy =

Set of philosophies originating in Asia

Eastern philosophy (also called Asian philosophy or Oriental philosophy) includes the various philosophies that originated in East, Southeast and South Asia, including Chinese philosophy, Japanese philosophy, Korean philosophy, and Vietnamese philosophy, which are dominant in East Asia; and Indian philosophy (including Hindu philosophy, Jain philosophy, Buddhist philosophy), which are dominant in South Asia, Southeast Asia, Tibet, Japan and Mongolia.

== Indian philosophy ==
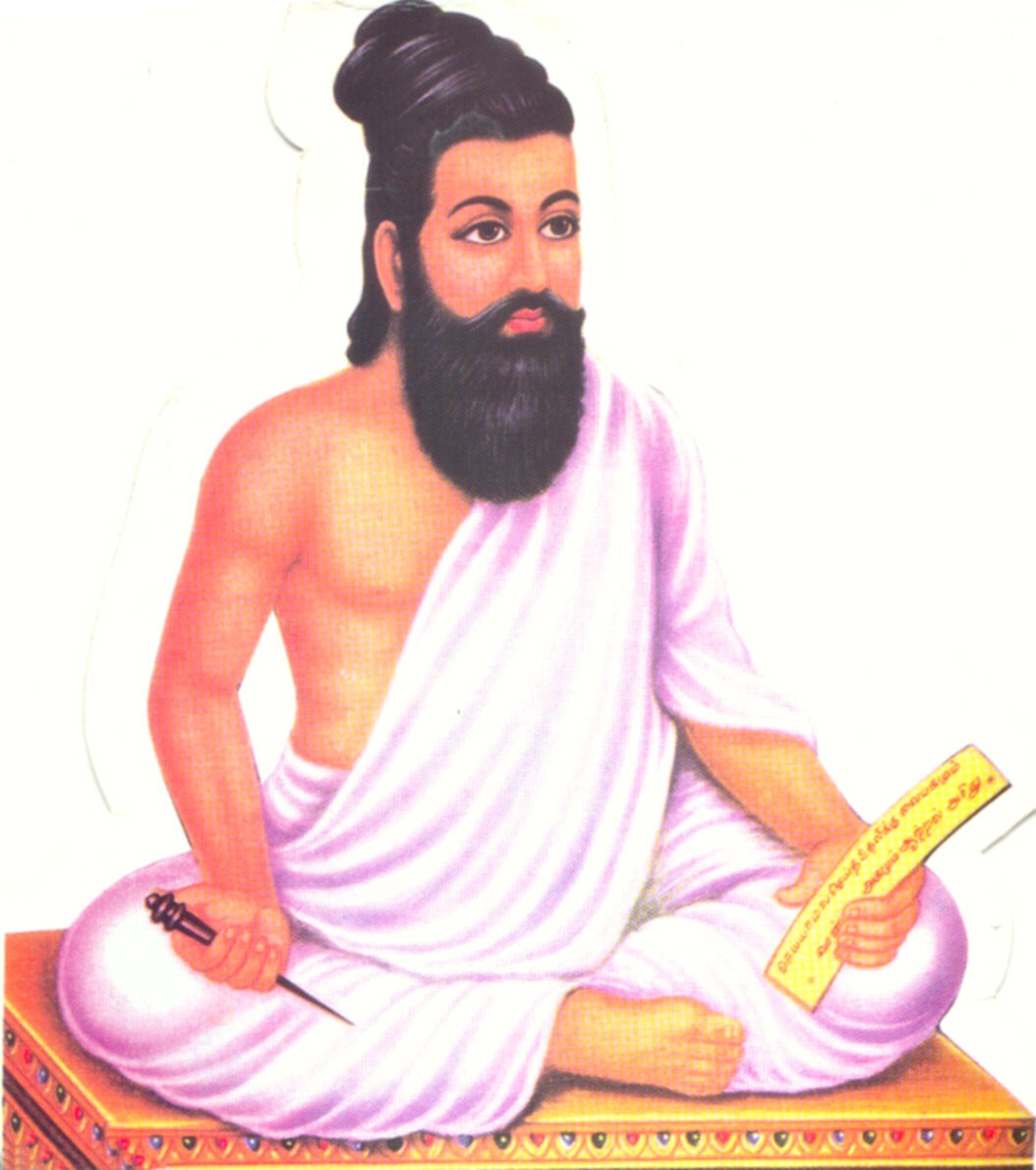
Valluvar, the Tamil philosopher of the post-Sangam era

Indian philosophy refers to ancient philosophical traditions (Sanskrit: dárśana; 'world views', 'teachings') of the Indian subcontinent. Hinduism may have roots dating back to the times of the Indus Valley civilization. The major orthodox schools arose sometime between the start of the Common Era and the Gupta Empire. These Hindu schools developed what has been called the "Hindu synthesis" merging orthodox Brahmanical and unorthodox elements from Buddhism and Jainism. Hindu thought also spread east to the Indonesian Srivijaya empire and the Cambodian Khmer Empire. These religio-philosophical traditions were later grouped under the label Hinduism. Hinduism is the dominant religion, or way of life, (Note: Hinduism is variously defined as a "religion", "set of religious beliefs and practices", "religious tradition", "a way of life" etc. For a discussion on the topic, see: "Establishing the boundaries" in Flood (2008) pp. 1–17.) in South Asia. It includes Shaivism, Vaishnavism, and Shaktism among numerous other traditions, and a wide spectrum of laws and prescriptions of "daily morality" based on karma, dharma, and societal norms. Hinduism is a categorization of distinct intellectual or philosophical points of view, rather than a rigid, common set of beliefs. Hinduism, with about one billion followers is the world's third-largest religion, after Christianity and Islam. Hinduism has been called the "oldest religion" in the world and is traditionally called Sanātana Dharma, "the eternal law" or the "eternal way"; beyond human origins. Western scholars regard Hinduism as a fusion (Note: Lockard 2007, p. 50: "The encounters that resulted from Aryan migration brought together several very different peoples and cultures, reconfiguring Indian society. Over many centuries a fusion of Aryan and Dravidian occurred, a complex process that historians have labeled the Indo-Aryan synthesis." Lockard 2007, p. 52: "Hinduism can be seen historically as a synthesis of Aryan beliefs with Harappan and other Dravidian traditions that developed over many centuries.") or synthesis (Note: Hiltebeitel 2007, p. 12: "A period of consolidation, sometimes identified as one of "Hindu synthesis," Brahmanic synthesis," or "orthodox synthesis," takes place between the time of the late Vedic Upanishads (c. 500 BCE) and the period of Gupta imperial ascendency" (c. 320–467 CE).") of various Indian cultures and traditions, with diverse roots (Note: Among its roots are the Vedic religion of the late Vedic period (Flood 1996, p. 16) and its emphasis on the status of Brahmans (Samuel 2010, pp. 48–53), but also the religions of the Indus Valley civilisation, the Sramana or renouncer traditions of north-east India, and "popular or local traditions".) and no single founder.

Some of the earliest surviving philosophical texts are the Upanishads of the later Vedic period (1000–500 BCE). Important Indian philosophical concepts include dharma, karma, samsara, moksha, and ahimsa. Indian philosophers developed a system of epistemological reasoning (pramana) and logic and investigated topics such as Ontology (metaphysics, Brahman-Atman, Sunyata-Anatta), reliable means of knowledge (epistemology, Pramanas), value system (axiology) and other topics. Indian philosophy also covered topics such as political philosophy as seen in the Arthashastra c. 4th century BCE and the philosophy of love as seen in the Kama Sutra. The Kural literature of the post-Sangam period between c. 1st century BCE and 5th century CE, written by the Tamil poet-philosopher Valluvar, is believed by many scholars to be based on Jain or Hindu philosophies.

Later developments include the development of Tantra and Iranian-Islamic influences. Buddhism mostly disappeared from India after the Muslim conquest in the Indian subcontinent, surviving in the Himalayan regions and south India. The early modern period saw the flourishing of Navya-Nyāya (the 'new reason') under philosophers such as Raghunatha Siromani (c. 1460–1540) who founded the tradition, Jayarama Pancanana, Mahadeva Punatamakara and Yashovijaya (who formulated a Jain response).

=== Eastern schools ===
The principal Indian philosophical schools are classified as either orthodox or heterodox – āstika or nāstika – depending on one of three alternate criteria: whether it believes the Vedas are a valid source of knowledge; whether the school believes in the premises of Brahman and Atman; and whether the school believes in afterlife and Devas.

There are six major schools of orthodox Indian Hindu philosophy—Nyaya, Vaisheshika, Samkhya, Yoga, Mīmāṃsā and Vedanta, and five major heterodox schools—Jain, Buddhist, Ajivika, Ajñana, and Cārvāka. However, there are other methods of classification; Vidyaranya for instance identifies sixteen schools of Hindu Indian philosophy by including those that belong to the Śaiva and Raseśvara traditions.

Each school of Hindu philosophy has extensive epistemological literature called Pramana-sastras.

In Hindu history, the distinction of the six orthodox schools was current in the Gupta period "golden age" of Hinduism. With the disappearance of Vaisheshika and Mīmāṃsā, it became obsolete by the later Middle Ages, when the various sub-schools of Vedanta (Dvaita "dualism", Advaita Vedanta "non-dualism" and others) began to rise to prominence as the main divisions of religious philosophy. Nyaya survived into the 17th century as Navya Nyaya "Neo-Nyaya", while Samkhya gradually lost its status as an independent school, its tenets absorbed into Yoga and Vedanta.

==== Sāmkhya and Yoga ====
Sāmkhya is a dualist philosophical tradition based on the Samkhyakarika (c. 320–540 CE), while the Yoga school was a closely related tradition emphasizing meditation and liberation whose major text is the Yoga sutras (c. 400 CE). Elements of proto-Samkhya ideas can, however, be traced back to the period of the early Upanishads. One of the main differences between the two closely related schools was that Yoga allowed for the existence of a God, while most Sāmkhya thinkers criticized this idea.

Sāmkhya epistemology accepts three of six pramanas (proofs) as the only reliable means of gaining knowledge; pratyakṣa (perception), anumāṇa (inference) and śabda (word/testimony of reliable sources). The school developed a complex theoretical exposition of the evolution of consciousness and matter. Sāmkhya sources argue that the universe consists of two realities, puruṣa (consciousness) and prakṛti (matter).

As shown by the Sāṁkhyapravacana Sūtra (c. 14th century CE), Sāmkhya continued to develop throughout the medieval period.

==== Nyāya ====
The Nyāya school of epistemology explores sources of knowledge (Pramāṇa) and is based on the Nyāya Sūtras (circa 6th century BCE and 2nd century CE). Nyāya holds that human suffering arises out of ignorance and liberation arises through correct knowledge. Therefore, they sought to investigate the sources of correct knowledge or epistemology.

Nyāya traditionally accepts four Pramanas as reliable means of gaining knowledge – Pratyakṣa (perception), Anumāṇa (inference), Upamāṇa (comparison and analogy) and Śabda (word, testimony of past or present reliable experts). Nyāya also traditionally defended a form of philosophical realism.

The Nyāya Sūtras was a very influential text in Indian philosophy, laying the foundations for classical Indian epistemological debates between the different philosophical schools. It includes, for example, the classic Hindu rejoinders against Buddhist not-self (anatta) arguments. The work also famously argues against a creator God (Ishvara), a debate which became central to Hinduism in the medieval period.

==== Vaiśeṣika ====
Vaiśeṣika is a naturalist school of atomism, which accepts only two sources of knowledge, perception, and inference. This philosophy held that the universe was reducible to paramāṇu (atoms), which are indestructible (anitya), indivisible, and have a special kind of dimension, called "small" (aṇu). Whatever we experience is a composite of these atoms.

Vaiśeṣika organized all objects of experience into what they called padārthas (literally: 'the meaning of a word') which included six categories; dravya (substance), guṇa (quality), karma (activity), sāmānya (generality), viśeṣa (particularity) and samavāya (inherence). Later Vaiśeṣikas (Śrīdhara and Udayana and Śivāditya) added one more category abhava (non-existence). The first three categories are defined as artha (which can be perceived) and they have real objective existence. The last three categories are defined as budhyapekṣam (product of intellectual discrimination) and they are logical categories.

==== Mīmāṃsā ====
Mīmāṃsā is a school of ritual orthopraxy, known for its hermeneutical study and interpretation of the Vedas. The study of dharma as ritual and social duty was central to the tradition. They also held that the Vedas were "eternal, authorless, [and] infallible" and that Vedic injunctions and mantras used in rituals constitute prescriptive actions of primary importance. Because of their focus on textual study and interpretation, Mīmāṃsā also developed theories of philology and the philosophy of language that influenced other Indian schools. They held that the primary purpose of language was to prescribe correct actions, rituals, and dharma (duty or virtue). Mīmāṃsā is also largely atheistic, holding that the evidence for the existence of God is insufficient and that the gods named in the Vedas have no existence apart from their names, mantras and their power.

A key text of the Mīmāṃsā school is the Mīmāṃsā Sūtra of Jaimini and major Mīmāṃsā scholars include Prabhākara (c. 7th century) and Kumārila Bhaṭṭa (fl. roughly 700). The Mīmāṃsā school strongly influenced Vedānta, also known as Uttara-Mīmāṃsā. However, while Mīmāṃsā emphasized karmakāṇḍa (the study of ritual actions) by focusing on the four early Vedas, the Vedānta schools emphasized jñanakāṇḍa (the study of knowledge) drawing on the later parts of Vedas like the Upaniṣads.

==== Vedānta ====
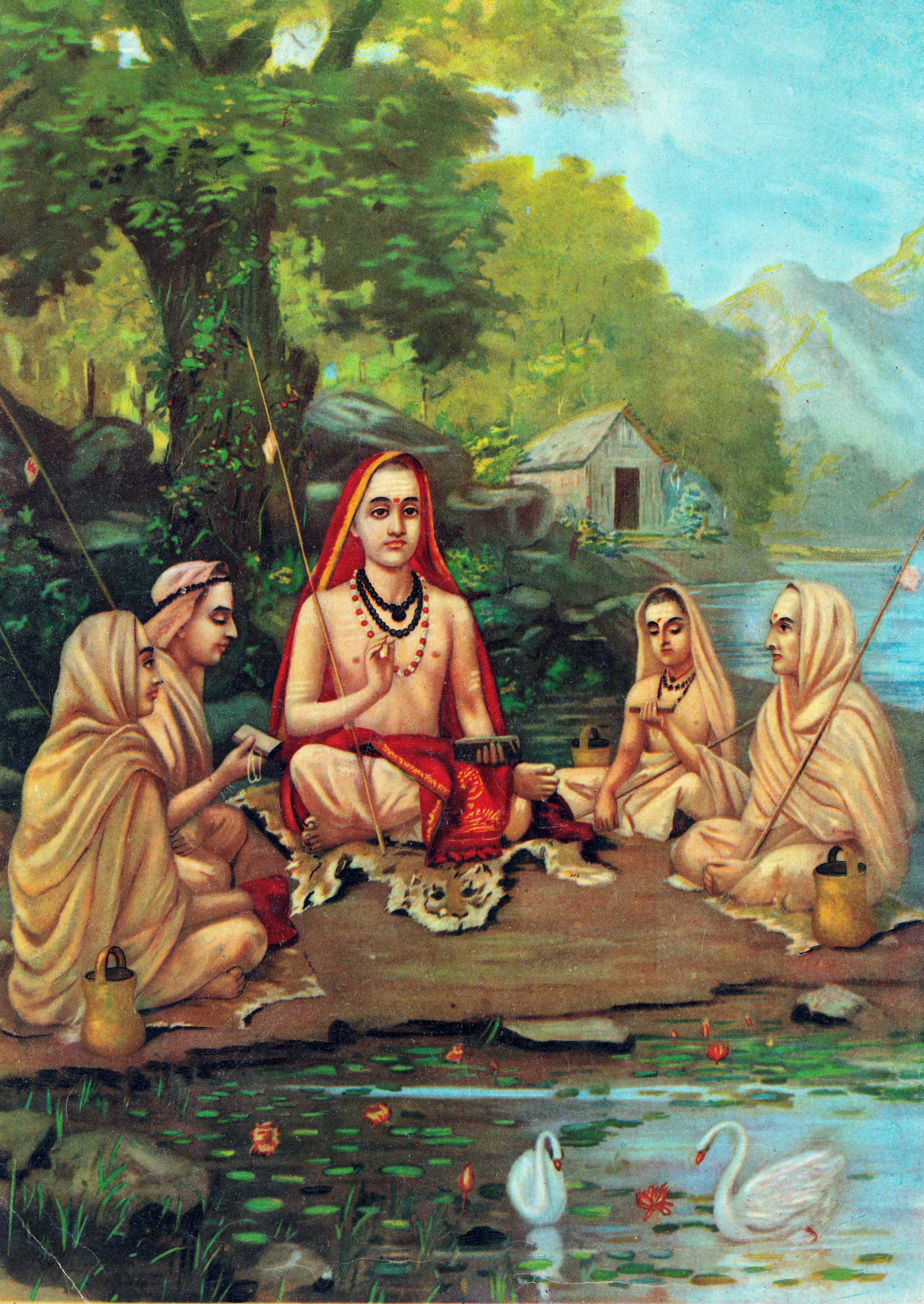
Adi Shankara (8th century CE) the main exponent of Advaita Vedānta

Vedānta (meaning "end of the Vedas") or Uttara-Mīmāṃsā, are a group of traditions which focus on the philosophical issues found in the Prasthanatrayi (the three sources), which are the Principal Upanishads, the Brahma Sutras and the Bhagavad Gita. Vedānta sees the Vedas, particularly the Upanishads, as a reliable source of knowledge.

The central concern for these schools is the nature of and the relationship between Brahman (ultimate reality, universal consciousness), Ātman (individual soul) and Prakriti (empirical world).

The sub-traditions of Vedānta include Advaita (non-dualism), Vishishtadvaita (qualified non-dualism), Dvaita (dualism), and Bhedabheda (difference and non-difference). Due to the popularity of the bhakti movement, Vedānta came to be the dominant current of Hinduism in the post-medieval period.

==== Other ====
While the classical enumeration of Indian philosophies lists six orthodox schools, there are other schools that are sometimes seen as orthodox. These include:

- Paśupata, an ascetic school of Shaivism founded by Lakulisha (≈2nd century CE).
- Śaiva Siddhānta, a school of dualistic Shaivism which was strongly influenced by Samkhya.
- Pratyabhijña (recognition) school of Utpaladeva (10th century) and Abhinavagupta (975–1025 CE), a form of non-dual Shaiva tantra.
- Raseśvara, the mercurial school
- Pāṇini Darśana, the grammarian school (which clarifies the theory of Sphoṭa)

=== Heterodox or Śramaṇic schools ===
The nāstika or heterodox schools are associated with the non-Vedic Śramaṇic traditions that existed in India since before the 6th century BCE. The Śramaṇa movement gave rise to a diverse range of non-Vedic ideas, ranging from accepting or denying the concepts of atman, atomism, materialism, atheism, agnosticism, fatalism to free will, extreme asceticism, strict ahimsa (non-violence) and vegetarianism. Notable philosophies that arose from Śramaṇic movement were Jainism, early Buddhism, Cārvāka, Ajñana, and Ājīvika.

==== Jain philosophy ====
Jain philosophy deals extensively with the problems of metaphysics, reality, cosmology, ontology, epistemology, and divinity. Jainism is essentially a transtheistic religion of ancient India. It continues the ancient Śramaṇa tradition, which co-existed with the Vedic tradition since ancient times. The distinguishing features of Jain philosophy include a mind-body dualism, denial of a creative and omnipotent God, karma, an eternal and uncreated universe, non-violence, the theory of the multiple facets of truth, and morality based on liberation of the soul. Jain philosophy attempts to explain the rationale of being and existence, the nature of the Universe and its constituents, the nature of the bondage and the means to achieve liberation. It has often been described as an ascetic movement for its strong emphasis on self-control, austerities, and renunciation. It has also been called a model of philosophical liberalism for its insistence that truth is relative and multifaceted and for its willingness to accommodate all possible view-points of the rival philosophies. Jainism strongly upholds the individualistic nature of the soul and personal responsibility for one's decisions, and that self-reliance and individual efforts alone are responsible for one's liberation.

The contribution of the Jains in the development of Indian philosophy has been significant. Jain philosophical concepts like Ahimsa, Karma, Moksa, Samsara, and the like are common with other Indian religions like Hinduism and Buddhism in various forms. While Jainism traces its philosophy from teachings of Mahavira and other Tirthankaras, various Jain philosophers from Kundakunda and Umasvati in ancient times to Yasovijaya and Shrimad Rajchandra in recent times have contributed to Indian philosophical discourse in uniquely Jain ways.

==== Cārvāka ====
Cārvāka or Lokāyata was an atheistic philosophy of scepticism and materialism, who rejected the Vedas and all associated supernatural doctrines. Cārvāka philosophers like Brihaspati were extremely critical of other schools of philosophy of the time. Cārvāka deemed the Vedas to be tainted by the three faults of untruth, self-contradiction, and tautology. They declared the Vedas to be incoherent rhapsodies invented by humans whose only usefulness was to provide a livelihood to priests.

Likewise, they faulted Buddhists and Jains, mocking the concept of liberation, reincarnation, and accumulation of merit or demerit through karma. They believed the viewpoint of relinquishing pleasure to avoid pain was the "reasoning of fools". Cārvāka epistemology holds perception as the primary source of knowledge while rejecting inference which can be invalid. The primary texts of Cārvāka, like the Barhaspatya sutras (c. 600 BCE) have been lost.

==== Ājīvika ====
Ājīvika was founded by Makkhali Gosala, it was a Śramaṇa movement and a major rival of early Buddhism and Jainism.

Original scriptures of the Ājīvika school of philosophy may once have existed, but these are currently unavailable and probably lost. Their theories are extracted from mentions of Ajivikas in the secondary sources of ancient Hindu Indian literature, particularly those of Jainism and Buddhism which polemically criticized the Ajivikas. The Ājīvika school is known for its Niyati doctrine of absolute determinism (fate), the premise that there is no free will, that everything that has happened, is happening and will happen is entirely preordained and a function of cosmic principles. Ājīvika considered the karma doctrine as a fallacy. Ājīvikas were atheists and rejected the authority of the Vedas, but they believed that in every living being is an ātman – a central premise of Hinduism and Jainism.

==== Ajñana ====
Ajñana was a Śramaṇa school of radical Indian skepticism and a rival of early Buddhism and Jainism. They held that it was impossible to obtain knowledge of metaphysical nature or ascertain the truth value of philosophical propositions; and even if knowledge was possible, it was useless and disadvantageous for final salvation. They were seen as sophists who specialized in refutation without propagating any positive doctrine of their own. Jayarāśi Bhaṭṭa (fl. c. 800), the author of the skeptical work entitled Tattvopaplavasiṃha ("The Lion that Devours All Categories"/"The Upsetting of All Principles"), has been seen as an important Ajñana philosopher.

=== Buddhist philosophies ===
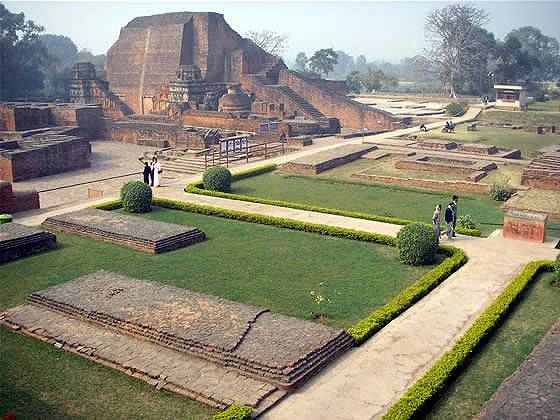
The Buddhist Nalanda university and monastery was a major center of learning in India from the 5th century CE to c. 1200.

Monks debating at Sera monastery, Tibet, 2013

Buddhist philosophy begins with the thought of Gautama Buddha (fl. between sixth and fourth centuries BCE) and is preserved in the early Buddhist texts. It generally refers to the philosophical investigations that developed among various Buddhist schools in India and later spread throughout Asia through the Silk Road. Buddhist thought is trans-regional and trans-cultural. It is the dominant philosophical tradition in Tibet and Southeast Asian countries like Sri Lanka and Burma.

Buddhism's main concern is soteriological, defined as freedom from dukkha (unease). Because ignorance of the true nature of things is considered one of the roots of suffering, Buddhist thinkers concerned themselves with philosophical questions related to epistemology and the use of reason. Key Buddhist concepts include the Four Noble Truths, Anatta (not-self) a critique of a fixed personal identity, the transience of all things (Anicca), and a certain skepticism about metaphysical questions. Buddhist thinkers in India and subsequently in East Asia have covered topics as varied as phenomenology, ethics, ontology, epistemology, logic, and philosophy of time.

Later Buddhist philosophical traditions developed complex phenomenological psychologies termed 'Abhidharma'. Mahayana philosophers such as Nagarjuna and Vasubandhu developed the theories of Shunyata (emptiness of all phenomena) and Vijnapti-matra (appearance only), a form of phenomenology or transcendental idealism. The Dignāga (c. 480–540) school of Pramāṇa promoted a complex form of epistemology and Buddhist logic. This tradition contributed to what has been called an "epistemological turn" in Indian philosophy. Through the work of Dharmakirti, this tradition of Buddhist logic has become the major epistemological system used in Tibetan Buddhist philosophy and debate.

After the disappearance of Buddhism from India, these philosophical traditions continued to develop in the Tibetan Buddhist, East Asian Buddhist, and Theravada Buddhist traditions. In Tibet, the Indian tradition continued to be developed under the work of thinkers like Sakya Pandita, Tsongkhapa, and Ju Mipham. In East Asian Buddhism, new developments were led by East Asian Yogacara thinkers such as Paramartha, Xuanzang, and Wŏnhyo and East Asian Madhyamaka thinkers like Jizang. New sinitic schools also arose, like Tiantai, founded by Zhiyi, Huayan, defended by figures like Fazang, and Zen, which included philosophers like Guifeng Zongmi.

==== Buddhist modernism ====
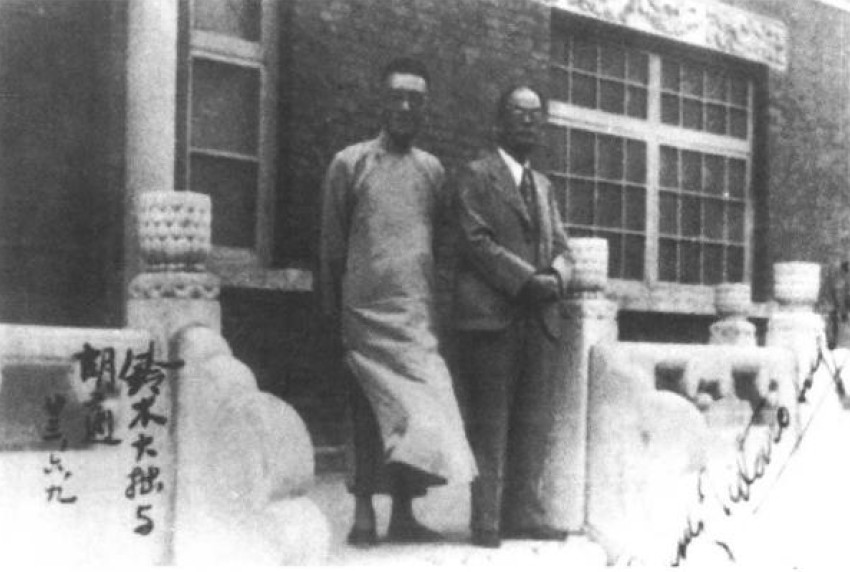
Hu Shih and DT Suzuki during his visit to China in 1934

The modern period saw the rise of Buddhist modernism and Humanistic Buddhism under Western influences and the development of Western Buddhism with influences from modern psychology and Western philosophy. Important exponents of Buddhist modernism include Anagarika Dharmapala (1864–1933) and the American convert Henry Steel Olcott, the Chinese modernists Taixu (1890–1947) and Yin Shun (1906–2005), Zen scholar D.T. Suzuki, and the Tibetan Gendün Chöphel (1903–1951). Buddhist modernism refers to "forms of Buddhism that have emerged out of engagement with the dominant cultural and intellectual forces of modernity." Forces which influenced modernists like Dhammapala and Yin Shun included Enlightenment values and Western science. A Neo-Buddhist movement was founded by the influential Indian Dalit leader B. R. Ambedkar in the 1950s who emphasized social and political reform.

Buddhist modernism includes various movements like Humanistic Buddhism, Secular Buddhism, the Vipassana movement, and Engaged Buddhism. Chinese humanistic Buddhism or "Buddhism for Human Life" (Chinese: 人生佛教; pinyin: rénshēng fójiào) which was to be free of supernatural beliefs has also been an influential form of modern Buddhism in Asia.

=== Sikh philosophy ===
Sikhism is an Indian religion developed by Guru Nanak (1469–1539) in the Punjab region during the Mughal Era. Their main sacred text is the Guru Granth Sahib. The fundamental beliefs include constant spiritual meditation of God's name, being guided by the Guru instead of yielding to capriciousness, living a householder's life instead of monasticism, truthful action to dharma (righteousness, moral duty), equality of all human beings, and believing in God's grace. Key concepts include Simran, Seva, the Three Pillars of Sikhism, and the Five Thieves.

=== Modern Indian philosophy ===
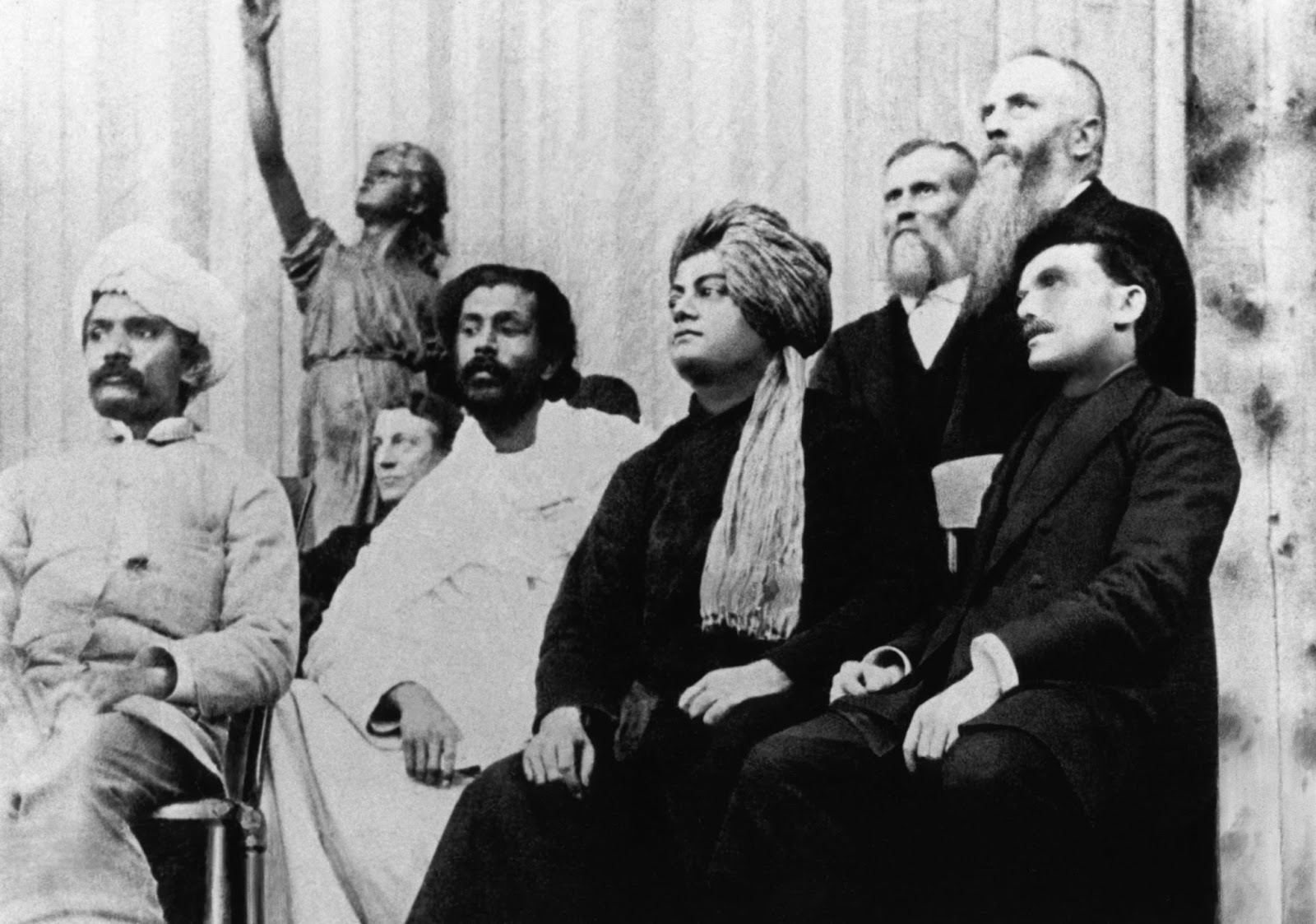
From left to right: Virchand Gandhi, Anagarika Dharmapala, Swami Vivekananda, G. Bonet Maury. Parliament of World Religions, 1893

In response to colonialism and their contact with Western philosophy, 19th-century Indians developed new ways of thinking now termed Neo-Vedanta and Hindu modernism. Their ideas focused on the universality of Indian philosophy (particularly Vedanta) and the unity of different religions. It was during this period that Hindu modernists presented a single idealized and united "Hinduism." exemplified by the philosophy of Advaita Vedanta. They were also influenced by Western ideas. The first of these movements was that of the Brahmo Samaj of Ram Mohan Roy (1772–1833). Swami Vivekananda (1863–1902) was very influential in developing the Hindu reform movements and in bringing the worldview to the West. Through the work of Indians like Vivekananda as well as westerners such as the proponents of the Theosophical society, modern Hindu thought also influenced western culture.

The political thought of Hindu nationalism is also another important current in modern Indian thought. The work of Mahatma Gandhi, Deendayal Upadhyaya, Rabindranath Tagore, Aurobindo, Krishna Chandra Bhattacharya, and Sarvepalli Radhakrishnan has had a large impact on modern Indian philosophy.

Jainism also had its modern interpreters and defenders, such as Virchand Gandhi, Champat Rai Jain, and Shrimad Rajchandra (well known as a spiritual guide of Mahatma Gandhi).

== East Asian philosophies ==
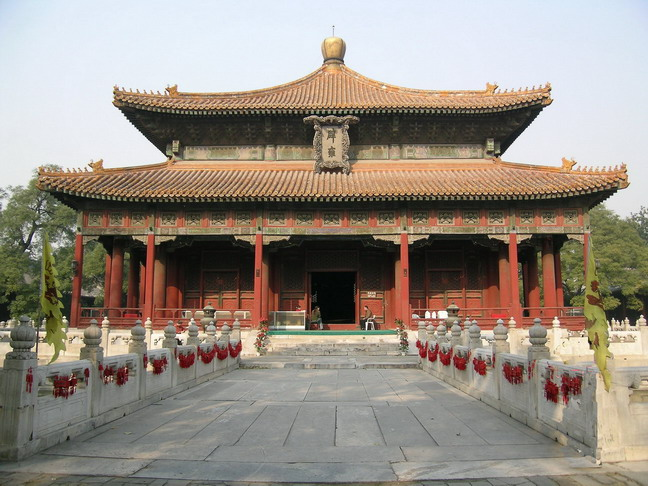
One of the main halls of the Guozijian (Imperial College) in downtown Beijing, the highest institution of higher learning in pre-modern China

=== Chinese ===
East Asian philosophical thought began in Ancient China, and Chinese philosophy begins during the Western Zhou dynasty and the following periods after its fall when the "Hundred Schools of Thought" flourished (6th century to 221 BCE). This period was characterized by significant intellectual and cultural developments and saw the rise of the major Chinese philosophical schools (Confucianism, Legalism, and Daoism) as well as numerous less influential schools (Mohism, School of Names, School of Yin Yang). These philosophical traditions developed metaphysical, political, and ethical theories which, along with Chinese Buddhism, had a direct influence on the rest of the East Asian cultural sphere. They are deeply rooted in the cycle of the seasons, part of a larger cycle of existence. Buddhism began arriving in China during the Han dynasty (206 BCE–220 CE), through a gradual Silk road transmission and gradually developed distinct Chinese forms (such as Chan/Zen).

==== Confucianism ====
Confucianism (孔教, Kǒngjiào — "Confucius' doctrine"), also known as "Ruism" (儒教, Rújiào — "doctrine of the scholars"), is a Chinese philosophical system with ritual, moral, and religious applications. The tradition developed around the teachings of Confucius (Kǒng Fūzǐ, 孔夫子, "Master Kong", 551–479 BCE) who saw himself as transmitting the values and theology of the ancestors before him. Other influential classical Confucian philosophers include Mencius and Xun Kuang who famously disagreed on the innate moral nature of humans.

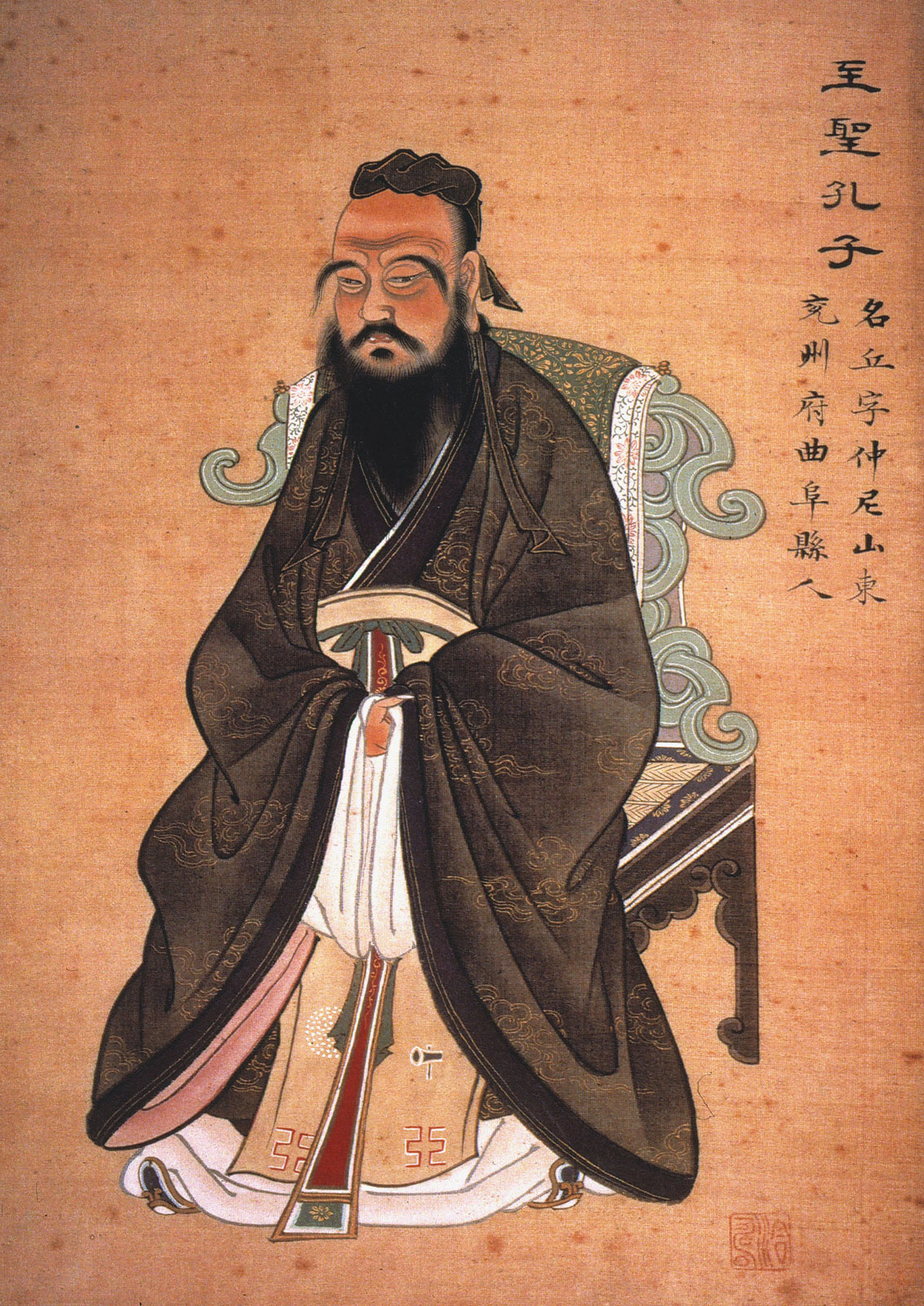
Confucius

Confucianism focuses on humanistic values like familial and social harmony, filial piety (孝, xiào), Rén (仁, "benevolence" or "humaneness") and Lǐ (禮/礼) which is a system of ritual norms that determines how a person should act to be in harmony with the law of Heaven. Confucianism traditionally holds that these values are based on the transcendent principle known as Heaven (Tiān 天), and also includes the belief in spirits or gods (shén).

Confucianism was a major ideology of the imperial state during the Han dynasty (206 BCE–220 CE) and was revived as Neo-Confucianism during the Tang dynasty (618–907). During later Chinese dynasties like Song dynasty (960–1297) and the Ming dynasty (1368–1644) as well as in the Korean Joseon dynasty (1392–1897) a resurgent Neo-Confucianism led by thinkers such as Zhu Xi (1130–1200) and Wang Yangming (1472–1529) became the dominant school of thought and was promoted by the imperial state. Beginning in the Song dynasty, Confucian classics were the basis of the imperial exams and became the core philosophy of the scholar-official class. Confucianism suffered setbacks during the 20th century, but is recently undergoing a revival, which is termed New Confucianism.

Traditionally, East Asian cultures and countries in the cultural sphere are strongly influenced by Confucianism, including Mainland China, Hong Kong, Macau, Japan, Korea, Taiwan, and Vietnam as well as various overseas territories settled predominantly by Overseas Chinese, such as Singapore.

==== Legalism ====
Legalism (法家，pinyin: Fǎjiā; school of "methods" or "standards") was a philosophical tradition which focused on laws, realpolitik, and bureaucratic management. Largely ignoring morality or idealized views of how society should be, they focused on the pragmatic government through the power of the autocrat and state. Their goal was to achieve increased order, security, and stability. They were initially influenced by Mohist ideas. A key figure of this school was administrator and political philosopher Shen Buhai (c. 400–337 BCE). Another central figure, Shang Yang (390–338 BCE), was a leading statesman and reformer who transformed the Qin state into the dominant power that conquered the rest of China in 221 BCE. Shen's successor Han Fei (c. 280–233 BCE) synthesized the thought of the other Legalists in his eponymous text, the Han Feizi, one of the most influential Legalist texts which was used by successive Chinese statesmen and rulers as a guide for statesmanship and bureaucratic organization of the imperial state.

==== Mohism ====
Mohism (墨家，Mòjiā; "School of Mo"), was founded by Mozi (c. 470–391 BCE) and his students. It was a major school of thought and rival of Confucianism and Taoism during the Spring and Autumn and Warring States periods (c. 770–221 BCE). The main text of the school is the Mozi (book). The administrative thought of Mohism was later absorbed by Legalism, their ethics absorbed into Confucianism and its books were also merged into the Taoist canon, as Mohism all but disappeared as an independent school after the Qin dynasty era.

Mohism is best known for the idea of "impartial care" (Chinese: 兼愛; pinyin: jiān ài; literally: "inclusive love/care"). According to Master Mo, persons should care equally for all other individuals, regardless of their actual relationship to them. Mo also advocated impartial meritocracy in government which should be based on talent, not blood relations. Mozi was against Confucian ritualism, instead emphasizing pragmatic survival through farming, fortification, and statecraft. Tradition is inconsistent, and human beings need an extra-traditional guide to identify which traditions are acceptable. The moral guide must then promote and encourage social behaviors that maximize the general benefit. As motivation for his theory, Mozi brought in the Will of Heaven, but rather than being religious his philosophy parallels utilitarianism.

Mohism was also associated with and influenced by a separate philosophical school known as the School of Names (Míngjiā; also known as 'Logicians'), that focused on the philosophy of language, definition, and logic.

==== Taoism ====
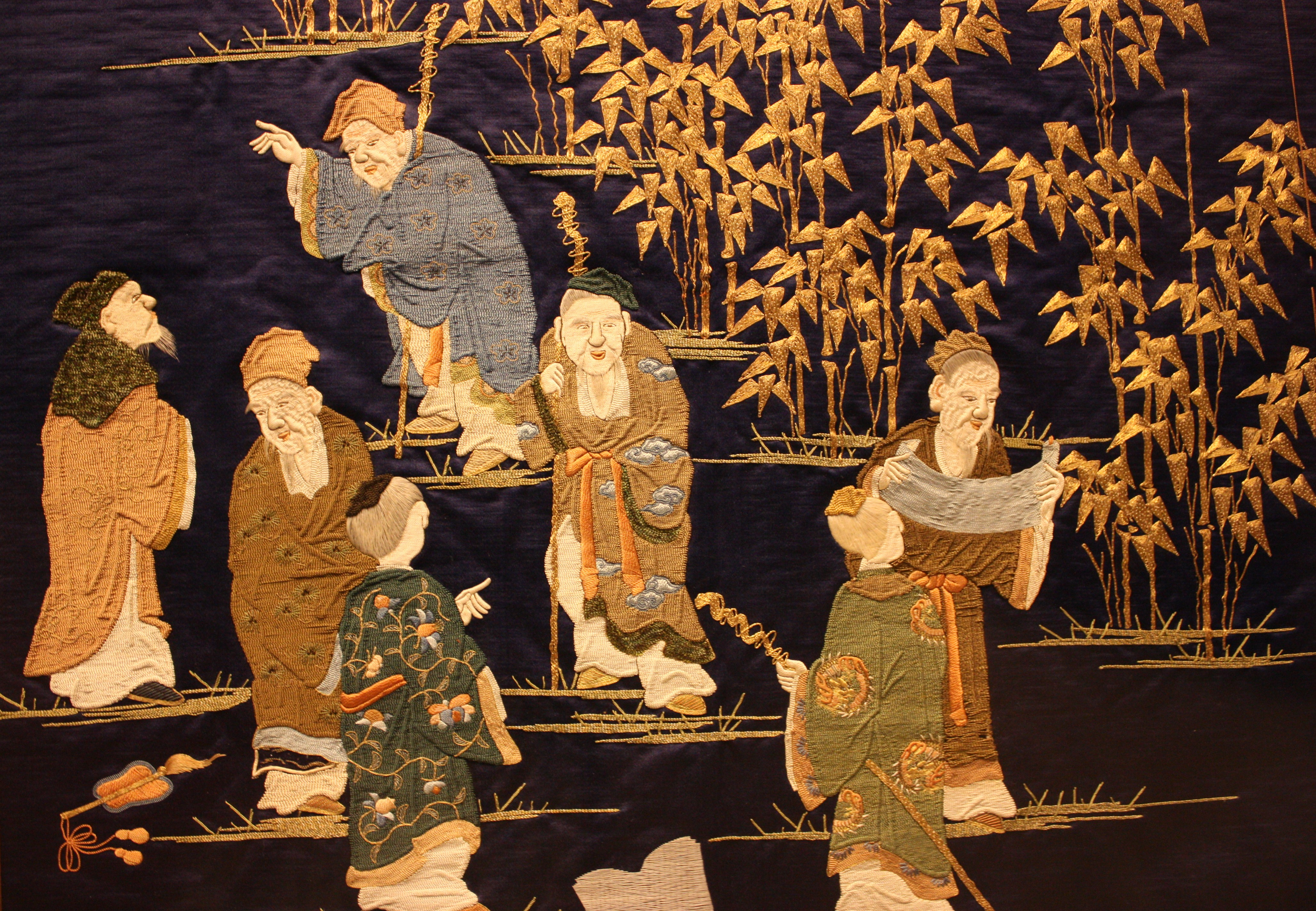
The Seven Sages of the Bamboo Grove, embroidery, 1860–1880

Taoism (or Daoism) is a term for various philosophies and religious systems that emphasize harmony with the Tao (Chinese: 道; pinyin: Dào; literally: "the Way") which is seen as the principle which is the source, pattern, and substance of everything that exists. Taoism tends to emphasize virtues such as wu wei (effortless action), ziran (naturalness), pu (simplicity), and spontaneity while placing less emphasis on norms and ritual (as opposed to Confucianism). The attainment of immortality through external alchemy (waidan) and internal alchemy (neidan) was an important goal for many Taoists historically.

Early forms of Taoism developed in the 4th century BCE, influenced by the cosmological theories of the School of Naturalists and the I Ching. The School of Naturalists or Yin-yang was another philosophical school that synthesized the concepts of yin-yang and the Five Elements; Zou Yan is considered the founder.

The Dao De Jing (Tao-Te-Ching, c. 4th century BCE), traditionally attributed to Laozi, and the Nan Hua Jing (Zhuang Zi) are considered the key texts of the tradition. The first organized form of Taoism, the Tianshi (Celestial Masters') school arose in the 2nd century CE. Xuanxue ("deep learning", also "Neo-Taoism") was a major philosophical movement influenced by Confucian scholarship, which focused on the interpretation of the Yijing, Daodejing, and Zhuangzi and which flourished during the third to sixth centuries CE. The most important philosophers of this movement were He Yan, Wang Bi, the Seven Sages of the Bamboo Grove, Ge Hong, and Guo Xiang. Thinkers like He Yan and Wang Bi focused on the deep nature of Tao, which they saw as being best exemplified by the term "Wu" (nothingness, non-being, negativity).

Other schools rose to prominence throughout Chinese history, such as the Shangqing school during the Tang dynasty (618–907), the Lingbao school during the Song dynasty (960–1279) and the Quanzhen School which develop during the 13th–14th centuries and during the Yuan dynasty. The later Taoist traditions were also influenced by Chinese Buddhism.

=== Modern East Asian philosophy ===
==== Chinese ====
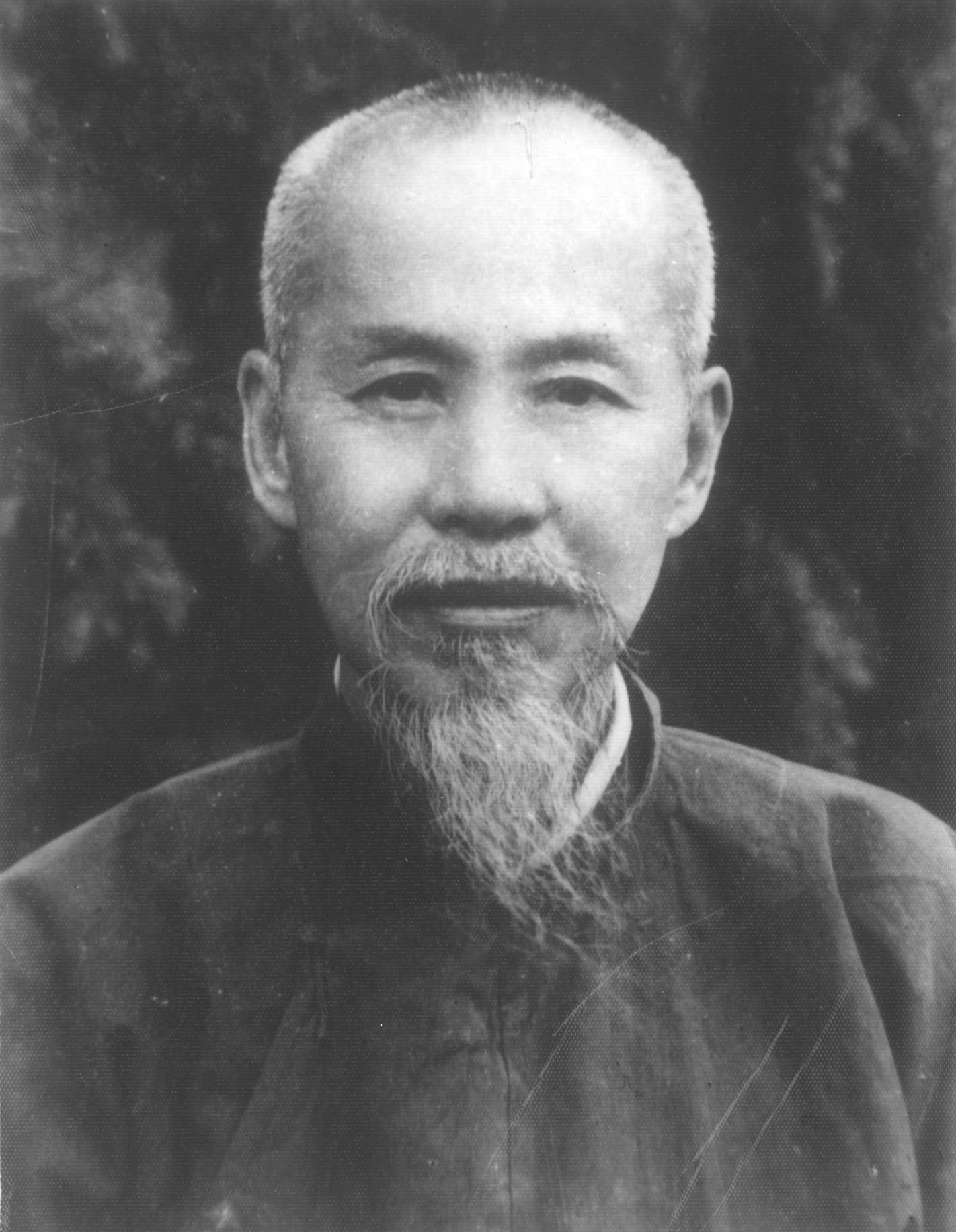
Xiong Shili circa 1960

Modern Chinese thought is generally seen as being rooted in Classical Confucianism (Jingxue), Neo-Confucianism (Lixue), Buddhism, Daoism, and Xixue ("Western Learning" which arose during the late Ming dynasty).

The Opium war of 1839–42 saw the beginning of Western and Japanese invasions and exploitation of China which was humiliating to Chinese thinkers. The late 19th and early 20th century saw Chinese thinkers such as Zhang Zhidong looking to Western practical knowledge as a way to preserve traditional Chinese culture, a doctrine that he defined as "Chinese Learning as Substance and Western Learning as Function" (Zhongti Xiyong).

The traditionalists meanwhile sought to revive and fortify traditional Chinese philosophical schools. Chinese Buddhist thought was promoted by thinkers like Yang Rensan and Ou-Yang Jingwu while another influential movement is New Confucianism (Chinese: 新儒家; pinyin: xīn rú jiā). New Confucianism is a traditionalist revival of Confucian thought in China beginning in the 20th-century Republican China which is also associated with New Conservatism. Key New Confucians of the first generation are Xiong Shili and Fung Youlan. The second generation (1950–1979) include individuals like Tang Junyi, Mou Zongsan, and Xu Fuguan, all three students of Xiong Shili. Together with Zhang Junmai, the second generation published the New Confucian Manifesto in 1958.

==== Japanese ====
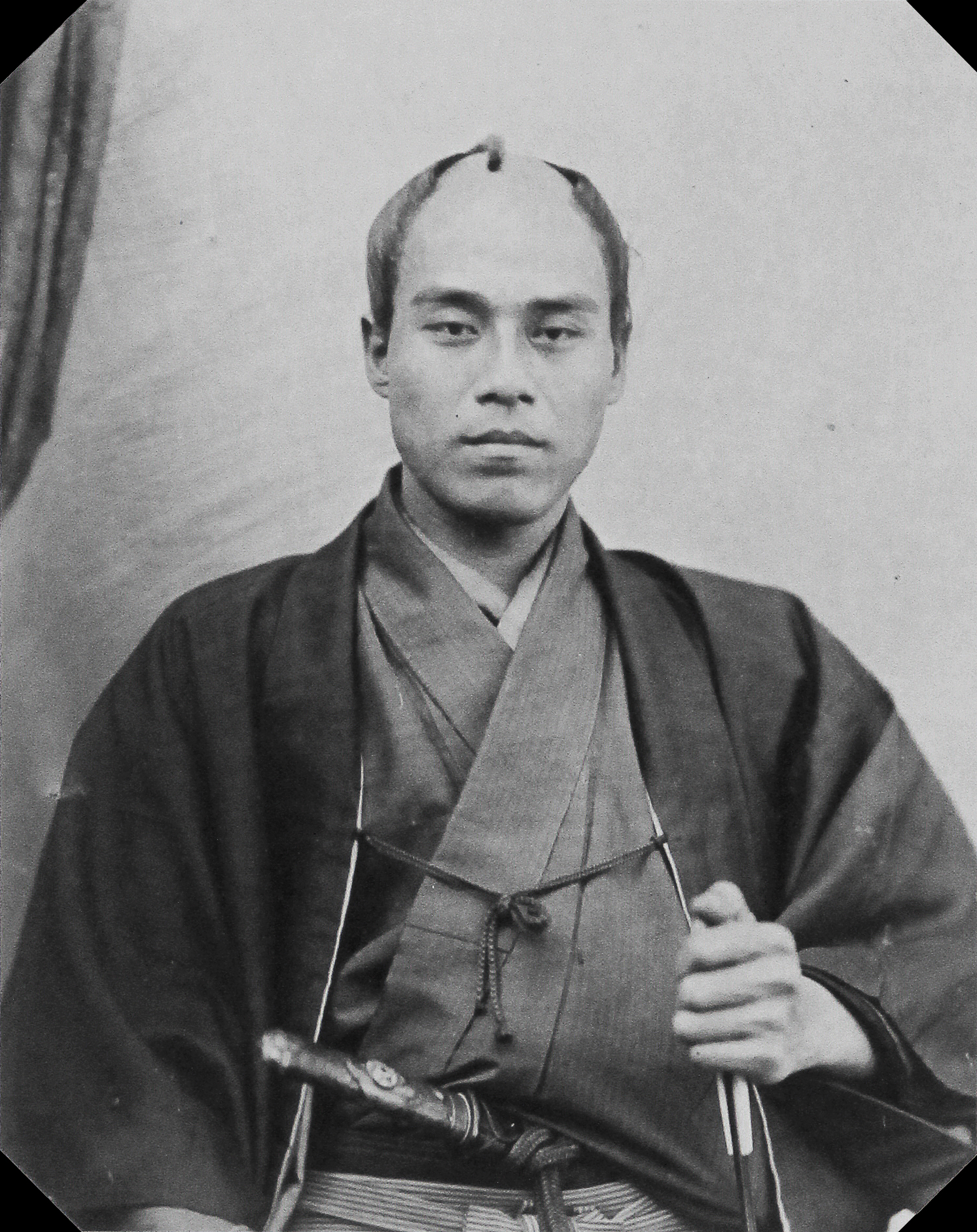
Fukuzawa Yukichi (1862) a key civil rights activist and liberal thinker

Modern Japanese thought is strongly influenced by Western science and philosophy. Japan's rapid modernization was partly aided by the early study of western science (known as Rangaku) during the Edo period (1603–1868). Another intellectual movement during the Edo period was Kokugaku (national study), which sought to focus on the study of ancient Japanese thought, classic texts, and culture over and against foreign Chinese and Buddhist cultures. A key figure of this movement is Motoori Norinaga (1730–1801), who argued that the essence of classic Japanese literature and culture was a sense called mono no aware ("sorrow at evanescence").

In the Meiji period (1868–1912), the modernist Meirokusha (Meiji 6, formed in 1874) intellectual society promoted European enlightenment thought. Meirokusha philosophers like Mori Arinori, Nishi Amane, and Fukuzawa Yukichi sought ways to combine Western ideas with Japanese culture and values. The Shōwa period (1926–1989) saw the rise of State Shinto and Japanese nationalism.

Japanese Buddhist philosophy was influenced by the work of the Kyoto School which drew from western philosophers (especially German philosophy) and Buddhist thought and included Kitaro Nishida, Keiji Nishitani, Hajime Tanabe, and Masao Abe. The most important trend in Japanese Buddhist thought after the formation of the Kyoto school is Critical Buddhism, which argues against several Mahayana concepts such as Buddha-nature and original enlightenment.

==== South Korea ====
Mostly, Hundred Schools of Thought, Neo-Confucianism and Taoism in East Asia and Buddhist philosophy have been studied by academic philosophers and Buddhists. General Indian philosophy and Japanese philosophy are limitedly studied. South Korean outside of academia tend to accept Eastern philosophy as a source of life lessons.

Korean shamanism and Donghak tend to be studied in the relation with Korean nationality.

==== North Korean ====
Juche, usually translated as "self-reliance", is the official political ideology of North Korea, described by the regime as Kim Il-Sung's "original, brilliant and revolutionary contribution to national and international thought". The idea states that an individual is "the master of his destiny" and that the North Korean masses are to act as the "masters of the revolution and construction".

== Syntheses of Eastern and Western philosophy ==
In the modern era, there have been many attempts to integrate Western and Eastern philosophical traditions.

Arthur Schopenhauer developed a philosophy that was essentially a synthesis of Hinduism with Western thought. He anticipated that the Upanishads (primary Hindu scriptures) would have a much greater influence in the West than they have had. However, Schopenhauer was working with heavily flawed early translations (and sometimes second-degree translations), and many feel that he may not necessarily have accurately grasped the Eastern philosophies which interested him.

Recent attempts to incorporate Western philosophy into Eastern thought include the Kyoto School of philosophers, who combined the phenomenology of Husserl with the insights of Zen Buddhism. Watsuji Tetsurô, a 20th-century Japanese philosopher attempted to combine the works of Søren Kierkegaard, Nietzsche, and Heidegger with Eastern philosophies. Some have claimed that there is also a definite eastern element within Heidegger's philosophy. For the most part, this is not made explicit within Heidegger's philosophy, apart from in the dialogue between a Japanese and inquirer. Heidegger did spend time attempting to translate the Tao Te Ching into German, working with his Chinese student Paul Hsaio. It has also been claimed that much of Heidegger's later philosophy, particularly the sacredness of Being, bears a distinct similarity to Taoist ideas. There are clear parallels between Heidegger and the work of Kyoto School, and ultimately, it may be read that Heidegger's philosophy is an attempt to 'turn eastwards' in response to the crisis in Western civilization. However, this is only an interpretation.

The 20th-century Hindu guru Sri Aurobindo was influenced by German Idealism and his integral yoga is regarded as a synthesis of Eastern and Western thought. The German phenomenologist Jean Gebser's writings on the history of consciousness referred to a new planetary consciousness that would bridge this gap. Followers of these two authors are often grouped together under the term Integral thought.

Following the Xinhai Revolution in 1911 and the end of the Qing dynasty, the May Fourth Movement sought to completely abolish the old imperial institutions and practices of China (such as the old civil service system). There were two major philosophical trends during this period. One was anti-traditional and promoted Western learning and ideas. A key figure of this anti-traditional current was Yan Fu (1853–1921) who translated various Western philosophical works including Smith's The Wealth of Nations and Mill's On Liberty. There were also attempts to incorporate Western ideas of democracy, and republicanism into Chinese political philosophy, notably by Sun Yat-Sen (1866–1925) at the beginning of the 20th century. Another influential modern Chinese philosopher was Hu Shih, who was a student of John Dewey at Columbia University and who promoted a form of pragmatism.

The influence of Marxism on modern Chinese political thought is vast, especially through the work of Mao Zedong, the most famous thinker of Chinese Marxist Philosophy. Maoism is a Chinese Marxist philosophy based on the teachings of the 20th-century Chinese Communist Party revolutionary leader Mao Zedong. It is based partially on earlier theories by Marx and Lenin, but rejects the urban proletariat and Leninist emphasis on heavy industrialization in favor of a revolution supported by the peasantry, and a decentralized agrarian economy based on many collectively worked farms. The current government of the People's Republic of China continues to espouse a pragmatic form of socialism as its official party ideology which it calls Socialism with Chinese characteristics. When the Chinese Communist Party took over the reign, previous schools of thought such as Taoism and Confucianism (except Legalism) were denounced as backward, and later purged during the violence of the Cultural Revolution which saw many Taoist and Buddhist temples and institutions destroyed.

Swiss psychologist Carl Jung was deeply influenced by the I Ching (Book of Changes), an ancient Chinese text that dates back to the Bronze Age Shang dynasty (c. 1700–1050 BCE). It uses a system of Yin and Yang, which it places into hexagrams for the purposes of divination. Carl Jung's idea of synchronicity moves towards an Oriental view of causality, as he states in the foreword to Richard Wilhelm's translation of the I Ching. He explains that this Chinese view of the world is based not on science as the West knows it, but on chance.

== Criticism ==
According to the British philosopher Victoria S. Harrison, the category of "Eastern philosophy", and similarly "Asian philosophy" and "Oriental philosophy" is a product of 19th-century Western scholarship and did not exist in East Asia or India. This is because in Asia there is no single unified philosophical tradition with a single root, but various autonomous traditions that have come into contact with each other over time.

Some Eurocentric thinkers claim that philosophy as such is only characteristic of Western cultures. The German philosopher Martin Heidegger is reported to have said that only Greek and German languages are suitable for philosophizing. It is still commonplace in Western universities to teach only Western philosophy and to ignore Asian philosophy altogether, or consider only newer Western-influenced Asian thought proper "philosophy". Carine Defoort, herself a specialist in Chinese thought, has offered support for such a "family" view of philosophy, while Rein Raud has presented an argument against it and offered a more flexible definition of philosophy that would include both Western and Asian thought on equal terms. In response, Ouyang Min argues that philosophy proper is a Western cultural practice and essentially different from zhexue, which is what the Chinese have, even though zhexue (originally tetsugaku) is actually a neologism coined in 1873 by Nishi Amane for describing Western philosophy as opposed to traditional Asian thought.

== See also ==
- Eastern ethics in business
- Eastern religions

== Sources ==
- Bowker, John (2000), The Concise Oxford Dictionary of World Religions, Oxford University Press
- Flood, Gavin D. (1996), An Introduction to Hinduism, Cambridge University Press
- Flood, Gavin (2008). The Blackwell Companion to Hinduism. John Wiley & Sons.
- Georgis, Faris (2010), Alone in Unity: Torments of an Iraqi God-Seeker in North America, Dorrance Publishing, ISBN 978-1-4349-0951-0
- Gomez, Luis O. (2013), Buddhism in India. In: Joseph Kitagawa, "The Religious Traditions of Asia: Religion, History, and Culture", Routledge, ISBN 978-1-136-87590-8, archived from the original on 3 July 2023
- Harvey, Andrew (2001), Teachings of the Hindu Mystics, Shambhala, ISBN 978-1-57062-449-0
- Hiltebeitel, Alf (2007), Hinduism. In: Joseph Kitagawa, "The Religious Traditions of Asia: Religion, History, and Culture". Digital printing 2007, Routledge, ISBN 978-1-136-87590-8, archived from the original on 3 July 2023
- Jones, Constance; Ryan, James D. (2006), Encyclopedia of Hinduism, Infobase Publishing, ISBN 978-0-8160-7564-5, archived from the original on 3 July 2023
- Knott, Kim (1998). Hinduism: A Very Short Introduction. Oxford University Press. ISBN 978-0-19-160645-8. Archived from the original on 3 July 2023.
- Kamil Zvelebil (1973), The Smile of Murugan: On Tamil Literature of South India, Leiden: E.J. Brill, ISBN 978-90-04-03591-1, archived from the original on 5 April 2023
- Lockard, Craig A. (2007), Societies, Networks, and Transitions. Volume I: to 1500, Cengage Learning, ISBN 978-0-618-38612-3, archived from the original on 3 July 2023
- Mohan Lal (1992), Encyclopaedia of Indian Literature: Sasay to Zorgot, Sahitya Akademi, ISBN 978-81-260-1221-3
- P.S. Sundaram (1990). Kural (Tiruvalluvar). Penguin Books. ISBN 978-93-5118-015-9. Archived from the original on 5 April 2023.
- Kaushik Roy (2012). Hinduism and the Ethics of Warfare in South Asia: From Antiquity to the Present. Cambridge University Press. ISBN 978-1-107-01736-8.
- Swamiji Iraianban (1997). Ambrosia of Thirukkural. Abhinav Publications. ISBN 978-81-7017-346-5.
- W. J. Johnson (2009). A dictionary of Hinduism. Oxford Reference. Oxford, UK: Oxford University Press. ISBN 978-01-98610-25-0. Archived from the original on 28 July 2021.
- M. S. Purnalingam Pillai (2015). Tamil Literature. Chennai: International Institute of Tamil Studies. p. 75.
- Narayanan, Vasudha (2009), Hinduism, The Rosen Publishing Group, ISBN 978-1-4358-5620-2, archived from the original on 3 July 2023
- Nath, Vijay (March–April 2001), "From 'Brahmanism' to 'Hinduism': Negotiating the Myth of the Great Tradition", Social Scientist, 29 (3/4): 19–50, doi:10.2307/3518337, JSTOR 3518337
- Osborne, E (2005), Accessing R.E. Founders & Leaders, Buddhism, Hinduism and Sikhism Teacher's Book Mainstream, Folens Limited
- Samuel, Geoffrey (2010), The Origins of Yoga and Tantra. Indic Religions to the Thirteenth Century, Cambridge University Press
- Sharma, Arvind (2003). The Study of Hinduism. University of South Carolina Press.
