= A Manifesto for a Re-appraisal of Sinology and Reconstruction of Chinese Culture =

1958 essay

"A Manifesto for a Re-appraisal of Sinology and Reconstruction of Chinese Culture" (Chinese: 為中國文化敬告世界人士宣言; pinyin: Wéi Zhōngguó Wénhuà Jìnggào Shìjiè Rénshì Xuānyán; also translated as "Declaration on Behalf of Chinese Culture Respectfully Announced to the People of the World") is a seminal 1958 essay that serves as a founding document of modern New Confucianism.

The manifesto was collectively authored by four prominent scholars: Carsun Chang (Zhang Junmai), Tang Chun-I (Tang Junyi), Mou Tsung-san (Mou Zongsan), and Hsu Fu-kuan (Xu Fuguan), all of whom were students of the philosopher Xiong Shili. In the document, the authors argue for the value and enduring relevance of Chinese philosophy and culture in the modern world. They seek to counter the prevailing trends of Western-centric historical analysis, advocating for a balanced dialogue between Chinese cultural traditions and Western modernity. The manifesto remains a primary text for understanding 20th-century Chinese intellectual history and the development of Confucian thought outside of mainland China.

== Objectives ==
The essay was first published in the journals Democratic Critique and the National Renaissance. It aimed to educate Western peoples with proper ways of appreciating Chinese culture. The Manifesto marked an important starting point for New Confucianism and while its significance towards ideology is debated, the essay's cohesion led to a shared identity and revival for Confucian thought. Many of the individual views of these four scholars differed but this essay issued a "common conviction" of the misunderstandings associated with Chinese culture as narrated by Western history and thought. In rejecting wholesale Westernization the essay "demands a place for Chinese cultural values on the world stage." The essay declares a new, proper manner in which to pursue the study of Sinology and explains Chinese culture from an experience viewpoint instead of an academic one. In Serina Chan's summary, the Manifesto advocates "post-colonial cultural nationalist discourse for cultural parity between China and the West in the midst of continuing Euro-American cultural dominance...(and) the document served to move the authors' Han Chinese cultural nationalist discourse into an imagined global arena for an ideological contest between Chinese and Western Cultures."

== Shortcomings of Western Framing of Chinese Culture ==
The essay indicates three main approaches and subsequent failures in the Western study of Sinology. The scholars attributed these shortcomings to Christian missionaries, Sinologists or those who study Chinese history, and to members of the present world politics. Each of these three approaches presented an insufficient explanation of Chinese culture to the West and required the creation of a new approach to foster respect for Chinese culture on the world stage.

The Manifesto claims "Chinese thought was first introduced into the Western world some three hundred years ago by Jesuit missionaries, who had come to China to spread Christianity and incidentally scientific knowledge and technological skills." The religious motives of the Christian missionaries accounted for differences in ideology, specifically with the Chinese Neo-Confucian "emphasis on rationalism and idealism". The Chinese scholars highlighted the interplay between the "way of heaven" (tiandao) and "the way of man" (rendao) in the revival of Confucianism, creating differences in religious thought with the Christian missionaries. The essay argues "Chinese culture arose out of the extension of primordial religious passion to ethical moral principles and to daily living. For this reason... its religious aspects have not been developed..." The difference in cultural and religious values created misunderstandings between the two cultures, and fostered a bias in the cultural diffusion associated with Christian missionaries and their trips to China.

The second approach that the New Confucian scholars denied is that taken by students and thinkers of Western Sinology. According to the manifesto, the new interest fostered by the Open Door Policy and the Boxer Rebellion led to curiosity about Chinese goods and history. "The objects of this interest soon included fine arts, archaeology, geography, history of frontier development, history of East-West communications, and even the characteristics of the written and oral language..." The issue taken up by the scholars was not in the curiosity towards Chinese artifacts, but to the apparent disinterest in the living, modern nation and its growth. The newfound awareness of China's antiquity downplayed the importance of China as a modern nation and actor on the world's stage. This study of antiquity "became the standard methodology of sinology" and portrayed an outdated and single faceted image of China as a country, a view the authors of the manifesto strongly disagreed with.

The last failed approach is an interest in the modern history of China and the viewing of China's "past through the present". Blaming the predominantly Western leading historians of contemporary China, the authors of the manifesto claim to uncover varying attitudes and biases towards present political situations in China. All feelings and analysis of the past are influenced too heavily by the present and by "personal feelings and subjective attitude" to be a realistic depiction of Chinese culture for the West. While the study of antiquity was too outdated for the manifesto, the study of modernity was too biased by present political motives.

== New Approach ==
The "new approach" asserted by the authors of the manifesto relies on "sympathy and reverence for the culture" in order to fully understand Chinese culture. Culture according to the manifesto is defined as: "the objective expression of the spiritual life of mankind," and this spiritual life must be experienced to be fully understood. The mistake made in the previous three approaches to Sinology has been in the refusal to accept or understand the life of the object of study. The manifesto states that "we can indeed say that without sympathy and respect there can be no real comprehension. What one experiences is mere appearance; one must dig beneath this appearance in order to communicate with the heart and soul of what lies hidden within it."

The manifesto claims that The Doctrine of "Hsin-Hsing" is most neglected by Western Sinologists is the "concentration of mind on an exhaustive study of the nature of the universe." This is the basis of all theories related to Chinese culture, and with a full grasp of "Hsin-Hsing" (literally "mind-nature"; xinxing 心性) one is able to understand the successes and limitations of Chinese culture. This doctrine allows for a development of the Chinese moral subject in harmony with the universe; but also displays the lack of development in "the political subject, the knowing subject, and the technological subject" in relation to the West. The rationale behind this is the differences in history between China and its Western counterparts. Western society has pluralistic origins in "Greek reason, Hebrew faith, and Roman Law," while China's culture emphasizes on "yiben 一本" or "one foundation". This changes the values associated with each culture, as China focuses more on the development of moral individuals it places less importance on competition and technological progress in comparison with the West. To truly study Sinology the manifesto states that the researcher must study this one foundation or "Hsin-Hsin" to experience the culture as a living, objective being. After this understanding is achieved, the limitations of Chinese culture are uncovered along with the successes. The "New Approach" does not all together denounce Western culture. It urges the Chinese to learn Western systems of logic, natural sciences, technological advances, and institutions of democratic government. The synthesis of the cultures requires a respectful learning and appreciation of what each has to offer in order to better both sides of the world.

== World Approach, Lessons for the West ==
The manifesto makes recommendations for Chinese culture to accept scientific and technological advances, but more clearly lays out lessons for the West to learn. The list includes five elements that, according to the manifesto, "the west must also learn from the East if it is to carry out its task as the world's cultural leader." The cultivation of a world culture, as well as promoting Chinese culture to the world's stage are primary goals of the manifesto and in order for either cultures to succeed they must engage in authentic communication. The manifesto dictates that the West needs the spirit and capacity of sensing the presence of what is at every particular moment, and of giving up everything that can be had. The second element is the all-embracing understanding or wisdom, third is the feeling of mildness and compassion. Fourth is how to perpetuate its culture, and the fifth that the "whole world is like one family." The signers of the manifesto asserted that by accepting New Confucianism in accordance with aspects of Western culture, the future of mankind can transform to be a more open, inclusive and creative culture.

== See also ==
"Manifesto For A Reappraisal Of Sinology And The Reconstruction Of Chinese Culture," in De Bary, Wm. Theodore; Lufrano, Richard (2000). Sources of Chinese Tradition. Vol. 2. Columbia University Press. pp. 550–555. ISBN 978-0-231-11271-0.
