= International Journal of the Asian Philosophical Association =

The International Journal of the Asian Philosophical Association (IJAPA) is a peer-reviewed bi-annual online interdisciplinary journal of Asian philosophy founded in 2008. The journal is published by the Asian Philosophical Association.
