= Kazuhiko Hattori =

Japanese composer, producer and music critic (born 1944)

- 服部和彦
- Born: 1944 (age 81–82); Japan
- Education: Nihon University
- Occupations: Composer; producer; music critic
- Musical career
- Genres: Classical; Chamber

Kazuhiko Hattori (Japanese: 服部和彦, romanized: Hattori Kazuhiko; born in 1944) is a Japanese composer, producer, and music critic.

== Career ==
Hattori was born in 1944. He graduated from Nihon University (Department of Technology) in 1966. From 1976 to 1977, he visited Asia, the Middle East, and Africa to pursue his study of ethnic music. Centering on chamber music, his compositions range from solos, orchestral works, to music for theatre. His compositions have been performed overseas, in music festival in Asia and Europe, and broadcast. His chamber music compositions have been presented at the Festival of Asia Composers League seven times. He has written commissioned compositions for several ensembles and orchestras, to which he has dedicated those works.

As a producer, he has produced the Japan Contemporary Music Festival, the 21st Century Chorus Festival, and series of performances of contemporary music from overseas. Over 40 years, he has studied East Asian philosophy, psychology, physics, biology, interdisciplinary subjects that he continues to study. He has also pursued a career as a lecturer and music critic and as Chairman of the Japan International League of Artists, as well as acting as head judge for the Tokyo International Competition for Chamber Music Composition and the JILA Music Competition.

== Compositions ==
- "Color of Rain" (雨の彩; Ame no Aya) – for flute
- "Seasons" (シーズン) – for piano
- "Memories of Waves" (波の記憶; Nami no Kioku) – for violin, clarinet, and piano
- "My Ears Are..." (私の耳は...; Watashi no Mimi wa) – for narrarion and music
- "After the Dark 2" (アフター・ザ・ダークII) – for string quartet
- "Time of repeating wind" (巡る風のとき; Meguru Kaze no toki) – piano concerto
- "Wind of Iris" (イリスの風; Iris no Kaze) – for a capella chorus
- "Mizar" (ミザール; Mizar – for marimba
- "Pleiades" (プレアデス; Pleiades) – for soprano and string orchestra
- "Epitaph" (エピターフ; Epitaph)
