= Robert Cummings Neville =

American philosopher and theologian (born 1939)

Robert Cummings Neville (born May 1, 1939, in St. Louis, Missouri, U.S.) is an American systematic philosopher and theologian, author of numerous books and papers, and former Dean of the Boston University School of Theology. He is professor emeritus of philosophy, Religion, and Theology at Boston University.

J. Harley Chapman and Nancy Frankenberry, editors of a festschrift—a collection of critical essays written in Neville's honor—entitled Interpreting Neville, consider him to be "one of the most significant philosophers and theologians of our time". Neville was Dean of Humanities and Fine Arts at the State University of New York at Stony Brook, and has taught at Yale, Fordham, and the State University of New York Purchase. He was granted a Doctorate honoris causa by the Russian Academy of Sciences Institute of Far Eastern Studies in 1996.

== Philosophical and theological work ==
=== Theory of being ===
Neville's most significant scholarly contribution is arguably his metaphysical theory of being (or being-itself): a new theory that involves an original solution to the ancient problem of the one and the many. He developed this theory for his PhD dissertation at Yale University (graduated 1963), of which his first book, God the Creator, constitutes a substantial revision. Exploring the implications of that theory has enabled him to produce a philosophy of nature that rivals Alfred North Whitehead's in scope and power, as can be seen from his three-volume Axiology of Thinking. The first volume in that trilogy, Reconstruction of Thinking (1981), was hailed by Donald W. Sherburne—editor of the corrected edition of Whitehead's Process and Reality—as "a truly important book. It is the first genuinely neo-Whiteheadian offering on a large, systematic scale." The second volume of the trilogy, Recovery of the Measure: Interpretation and Nature (1989), was also well received. The prominent Confucian scholar and philosopher David L. Hall wrote of it as follows: "Because of its timeliness, the brilliance of its arguments, and the profundity of its conclusions, there is good reason to believe that this work will shortly become the focus of genuine and widespread discussion. With the publication of this latest installment of his Axiology of Thinking, Neville emerges as one of the strongest voices in American philosophy." The complexity, systematic breadth, and analytic depth of Neville's thought is most evident in this second volume of his trilogy.

=== Comparative theology ===
Neville is also well known as a religious studies scholar, especially for his comparative theology. He has authored several books in the field of comparative religion: The Tao and the Daimon (1981), Behind the Masks of God (1991), Boston Confucianism (2000), Ritual and Deference (2008), and Realism in Religion (2009). In addition, Neville is the editor of three volumes that resulted from a "Comparative Religious Ideas Project" funded by the National Endowment for the Humanities, the Henry Luce Foundation, and Boston University: Religious Truth, Ultimate Realities, and The Human Condition, (all 2001). The latter three texts present a theory of comparison that uses C. S. Peirce's notion of "vagueness" to develop what Neville calls vague categories of comparison. (A vague category is any category of thought that is left open to mutually incompatible specifications so as to allow for interpretations that might conflict with each other. For example, all swans are black specifies the vague proposition all swans are colored in a manner that contradicts all swans are white.) Neville argues that the judicious use of such categories enables comparisons to be made in such a way that respects the integrity and diversity of religious traditions.

=== Doctrine of creation ===
Neville's comparative work in religion and his systematic philosophy come together in numerous works of theology that attempt to interpret the Christian tradition in a manner that not only respects but even accommodates non-Christian voices. He is encouraged in this attempt by an interpretation of the doctrine of creation ex nihilo that he developed in his first book, God the Creator (1968). In that book, Neville argues that to be is to be determinate, that to be determinate is to contrast with other determinations in a context of mutual relevance, and that the ultimate context of mutual relevance—that which grounds the many determinations of being—is pure indeterminacy. But if all things are what they are by virtue of their contrast with indeterminacy, then they come to be out of nothing: they are created ex nihilo. According to the prominent Whiteheadian philosopher Lewis Ford, Neville's is one of the "two most distinctive theories of creation in the twentieth century, both in terms of what it means to bring actualities into being, and in terms of funding the relationship between God and the world in its widest perspective." (The other theory Ford has in mind is Alfred North Whitehead's.) Though creation ex nihilo is typically associated with personalist varieties of theism, Neville's Creator is the purely indeterminate ground of beings. For this reason, he is encouraged to explore the possibility of Buddhist, Taoist, and Confucian parallels in such texts as The Tao and the Daimon (1982), and Behind the Masks of God (1991). He is currently (April 2011) writing a trilogy of theological texts, the first installment of which was published in 2006 under the title, On the Scope and Truth of Theology: Theology as Symbolic Engagement. Neville's theology is critically engaged by numerous authors in a festschrift entitled, Theology in Global Context: Essays in Honor of Robert Cummings Neville (2004), edited by Amos Yong and Peter Heltzela.

=== Proponent of Confucianism ===
Robert Neville is a proponent of Confucianism as a world philosophy. Together with several scholars from the Boston area of the United States—especially including Tu Weiming of Harvard University—Neville encourages the development of what has come to be called "Boston Confucianism." As its name suggests, Boston Confucianism is a "non-East Asian" expression of the Confucian tradition. Neville has produced several books devoted to Confucian themes, including one that argues at length for the legitimacy and exhibits the vitality and importance of Boston Confucianism: Boston Confucianism: Portable Tradition in the Late-Modern World (2000). His contributions to Chinese philosophy have resulted in his being given an honorary Chinese name: NAN Lo Shana.

== Academic and ecclesiastical positions ==
Neville is a past president of the American Academy of Religion, of the International Society for Chinese Philosophy, of the Metaphysical Society of America, of the Association of United Methodist Theological Schools, and of the Trustees of the Boston Theological Institute. He is a former member of the Accrediting Commission of the Association of Theological Schools in the United States and Canada and of the Commission on Theological Education of the United Methodist Church. Neville is currently a member of the editorial boards of Soundings and The Journal of the American Academy of Religion, and is the Associate Editor for Behavioral and Neurological Articles for The Encyclopedia of Bioethics. He was formerly on the editorial board of the Quarterly Review. An ordained elder in the Missouri East Conference of the United Methodist Church, Neville has pastored in Missouri and New York, and was Boston University chaplain from 2005 to 2009.

== Personal life ==
He is married to Beth Neville, with whom he has three children and several grandchildren. An accomplished artist (emphasizing oil and watercolor paintings, pen and ink illustrations), Beth creates much of the artwork for Robert Neville's books. Several color plates of her work appear in his "Symbols of Jesus".

== Selected works (in chronological order) ==
- God the Creator: On the Transcendence and Presence of God. University of Chicago Press, 1968. Reprinted with corrections and a new Preface by Albany, NY: State University of New York (SUNY) Press, 1992. ISBN 9780791408445
- The Cosmology of Freedom. New Haven: Yale University Press, 1974. New edition; Albany: State University of New York Press, 1995.
- Soldier, Sage, Saint. New York: Fordham University Press, 1978.
- Reconstruction of Thinking. Volume 1 of The Axiology of Thinking. Albany: State University of New York Press, 1981.
- The Tao and the Daimon: Segments of a Religious Inquiry. Albany: State University of New York Press, 1982.
- The Puritan Smile: A Look toward Moral Reflection. Albany: State University of New York Press, 1987.
- Recovery of the Measure. Volume 2 of the Axiology of Thinking. Albany: State University of New York Press. 1989.
- Behind the Masks of God. Albany: State University of New York Press, 1991. Translated into Chinese with a Preface by Chen Yunquan, 1997.
- A Theology Primer. New York, NY: SUNY Press, 1991. ISBN 9780791408506
- The Highroad Around Modernism. Albany, NY: State University of New York (SUNY) Press, 1992. ISBN 9780791411520
- Eternity and Time's Flow. New York, NY: SUNY Press, 1993. ISBN 9780791416006
- Creativity and God: A Challenge to Process Theology. New York: Seabury Press, 1995. ISBN 9780791428221
- Normative Cultures. Volume 3 of the Axiology of Thinking. Albany: State University of New York Press, 1995.
- The Truth of Broken Symbols. Albany: State University of New York Press, 1996.
- The God Who Beckons: Theology in the Form of Sermons. Nashville: Abingdon Press, 1999.
- Boston Confucianism: Portable Tradition in the Late-Modern World. State University of New York, 2000. Foreword written by Tu Weiming. Part of the State University of New York series in Chinese Philosophy and Culture. This title is an overview of the thought and practice of the Boston Confucianism movement, although it is not an official manifesto. Hardcover: ISBN 9780791447178 Paperback ISBN 978-0791447185
- Religion in Late Modernity. Albany: State University of New York Press, 2002.
- Symbols of Jesus: A Christology of Symbolic Engagement. Cambridge University Press, 2002. ISBN 9780521003537
- Preaching the Gospel Without Easy Answers. Nashville: Abingdon Press, 2005.
- The Scope and Truth of Theology: Theology as Symbolic Engagement. New York: T & T Clark International/Continuum, 2006.
- Ritual and Deference: Extending Chinese Philosophy in a Comparative Context. New York, NY: State University of New York (SUNY) Press, 2008. Part of the SUNY series in Chinese Philosophy and Culture. ISBN 9780791474587
- Realism in Religion: A Pragmatist’s Perspective. New York, NY: SUNY Press, 2009. ISBN 9781438428260
- Ultimates: Philosophical Theology Volume One. Albany, NY: State University of New York Press, 2013.
- Existence: Philosophical Theology Volume Two. Albany, NY: State University of New York Press, 2014.
- Seasons of the Christian Life. Wipf and Stock Publishers, 2016. ISBN 9781498286190
- Religion: Philosophical Theology Volume Three. Albany, NY: State University of New York Press, (forthcoming).
