= Asian Philosophy =

Asian Philosophy may refer to:

- Eastern philosophy - philosophy originating and traditionally practiced in the countries of South and East Asia (more correct in plural: Asian/Eastern philosophies
- Asian Philosophy (journal), a quarterly journal published by Taylor and Francis
