= Asian Philosophical Association =

Philosophical organization

The Asian Philosophical Association is a philosophical organization whose purpose is to promote the study of Asian philosophies and interpretations of these philosophies. The organization holds annual meetings and publishes the International Journal of the Asian Philosophical Association.
