= Tu Weiming =

Chinese philosopher

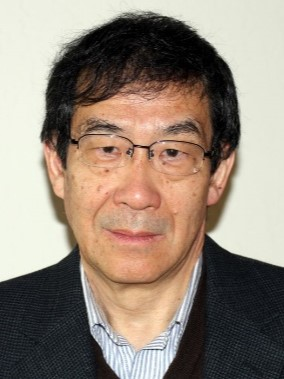
- Born: February 6, 1940 (age 86); Kunming, Yunnan, China

Academic background
- Education: Tunghai University (BA); Harvard University (MA, PhD)
- Influences: Mou Zongsan; Tang Junyi; Xu Fuguan

Academic work
- Discipline: Philosophy; anthropology
- Sub-discipline: Ethics
- School or tradition: New Confucianism (Boston Confucianism)
- Institutions: Princeton University; University of California, Berkeley; Harvard University; Peking University
- Notable works: Confucian Thought (1985); The Global Significance of Concrete Humanity (2010)
- Notable ideas: Cultural China; dialogical civilization; spiritual humanism
- Website: tuweiming.net

Tu Weiming (Note: Simplified Chinese: 杜维明; traditional Chinese: 杜維明; pinyin: Dù Wéimíng.) (born 1940) is a Chinese-born Taiwanese-American New Confucian philosopher. He is Chair Professor of Humanities and the founding director of the Institute for Advanced Humanistic Studies at Peking University. He is also a professor emeritus at Harvard University, where he was the Harvard-Yenching Professor of Chinese History and Philosophy from 1981 to 2010.

== Early life and education ==
Tu was born on February 6, 1940, in Kunming, Yunnan, China, and grew up in Taiwan. He graduated from Tunghai University with a Bachelor of Arts in Chinese literature in 1961. As an undergraduate, he studied under Confucian scholars Mou Zongsan, Tang Junyi, and Xu Fuguan. He then moved to the U.S. to pursue graduate studies at Harvard University, where he studied under professors Benjamin I. Schwartz, Talcott Parsons, and Robert Neelly Bellah. Tu earned his Master of Arts in East asian studies from Harvard in 1963 and his Ph.D. in history and East Asian languages from Harvard in 1968. His doctoral dissertation was titled, "The quest for self-realization: A study of Wang Yang-ming's formative years".

== Career ==
Tu was Harvard–Yenching Professor of Chinese History and Philosophy and of Confucian Studies in the Department of East Asian Languages and Civilizations at Harvard University (1981–2010) and Director of the Harvard–Yenching Institute (1996–2008). He also held faculty positions at Princeton University (1968–1971) and the University of California at Berkeley (1971–1981) and was Director of the Institute of Culture and Communication at the East–West Center in Hawaii (1990–1991).

Tu was a visiting professor at Beijing Normal University, the Chinese University of Hong Kong, National Taiwan University, Peking University, and the University of Paris. He currently holds honorary professorships from the Cheung Kong Graduate School of Business, Jinan University, Renmin University, the Shanghai Academy of Social Sciences, Sun Yat-sen University, Soochow University, and Zhejiang University. He is also a member of International Advisory Council in Universiti Tunku Abdul Rahman.

Tu has been awarded honorary degrees by King's College London, Lehigh University, Lingnan University in Hong Kong, Grand Valley State University, Shandong University, Soka University in Japan, Tunghai University in Taiwan, and the University of Macau.

In 1988, Tu was one of many public intellectuals who were asked by Life magazine to give their impressions on "The Meaning of Life". In 1994, he was featured in A World of Ideas with Bill Moyers: A Confucian Life in America (Films for the Humanities and Sciences). In 2001, he was appointed by Kofi Annan as a member of the United Nations' "Group of Eminent Persons" to facilitate the Dialogue Among Civilizations. In 2004, he gave a presentation on inter-civilizational dialogue to the executive board of UNESCO. He was also one of the eight Confucian intellectuals who were invited by the Singaporean government to develop the "Confucian Ethics" school curriculum.

Tu has been the recipient of numerous awards including the grand prize of International Toegye Society (2001), the second Thomas Berry Award for Ecology and Religion (2002), the Lifelong Achievement Award by the American Humanist Society (2007), the first Confucius Cultural Award by Qufu (2009), the first Brilliance of China Award by China Central Television Beijing (2013), and the Global Thinkers Forum Award for Excellence in Cultural Understanding (2013).

He is a fellow of the American Academy of Arts and Sciences (1988), a member of Academia Sinica (2018), an executive member of the Federation of International Philosophical Societies, and a tutelary member of the International Institute of Philosophy.

== Publications ==
=== Books ===
- Tu, Weiming. (1976). Neo-Confucian thought in action: Wang Yang-Ming's youth. Berkeley, CA: University of California Press.
- Tu, Weiming. (1978). Humanity and self-cultivation: Essays in Confucian thought. Boston, MA: Asian Humanities Press.
- Tu, Weiming. (1984). Confucian ethics today: The Singapore challenge. Singapore: Federal Publications.
- Tu, Weiming. (1985). Confucian thought: Selfhood as creative transformation. Albany, NY: State University of New York Press.
- Tu, Weiming. (1989). Centrality and commonality: An essay on Confucian religiousness. Albany, NY: State University of New York Press.
- Tu, Weiming. (1989). Confucianism in historical perspective. Singapore: Institute of East Asian Philosophies.
- Tu, Weiming. (1993). Way, learning, and politics: Essays on the Confucian intellectual. Albany, NY: State University of New York Press.
- Tu, Weiming. (2010). The global significance of concrete humanity: Essays on the Confucian discourse in cultural China. New Delhi, India: Center for Studies in Civilizations and Munshiram Manoharlal Publishers.
- Tu, Weiming, & Ikeda, Daisaku. (2011). New horizons in Eastern humanism: Buddhism, Confucianism and the quest for global peace. London: I. B. Tauris.
- Murata, Sachiko, Chittick, William C., & Tu, Weiming. (2009). The sage learning of Liu Zhi: Islamic thought in Confucian terms. Cambridge, MA: Harvard University Asia Center and Harvard University Press.

=== Edited books ===
- Tu, Weiming. (Ed.). (1991). The triadic chord: Confucian ethics, industrial East Asia, and Max Weber. Singapore: Institute of East Asian Philosophies.
- Tu, Weiming. (Ed.). (1994). China in transformation. Cambridge, MA: Harvard University Press.
- Tu, Weiming. (Ed.). (1994). The living tree: The changing meaning of being Chinese today. Stanford, CA: Stanford University Press.
- Tu, Weiming. (Ed.). (1996). Confucian traditions in East Asian modernity. Cambridge, MA: Harvard University Press.
- Tu, Weiming, Hejtmanek, Milan, & Wachman, A. (Eds.). (1992). The Confucian world observed: A contemporary discussion of Confucian humanism in East Asia. Honolulu, HI: East–West Center and University of Hawaii Press.
- Tu, Weiming, & Tucker, Mary Evelyn. (Eds.). (2003/2004). Confucian spirituality (Vols. 1–2). New York, NY: Crossroad.
- De Barry, William Theodore, & Tu, Weiming. (Eds.). (1998). Confucianism and human rights. New York, NY: Columbia University Press.
- Liu, James T. C., & Tu, Weiming. (Eds.). (1970). Traditional China. Englewood Cliffs, NJ: Prentice-Hall.
- Yao, Xinzhong, & Tu, Weiming. (Eds.). (2010). Confucian studies (Vols. 1–4). London: Routledge.
- Zhang, Everett, Kleinman, Arthur, & Tu, Weiming. (Eds.). (2011). Governance of life in Chinese moral experience: The quest for an adequate life. London: Routledge.

=== Articles ===
- Tu, Weiming. (1991). A Confucian perspective on global consciousness and local awareness. International House of Japan Bulletin, 11(1), 1–5.
- Tu, Weiming. (1995). The mirror of modernity and spiritual resources for the global community. Sophia: International Journal for Philosophy of Religion, Metaphysical Theology and Ethics, 34(1), 79–91.
- Tu, Weiming. (1998). Mustering the conceptual resources to grasp a world in flux. In Julia A. Kushigian (Ed.), International studies in the next millennium: Meeting the challenge of globalization (pp. 3–15). Westport, CT: Praeger.
- Tu, Weiming. (1999). A Confucian perspective on the core values of the global community. Review of Korean Studies, 2, 55–70.
- Tu, Weiming. (2002). Beyond the Enlightenment mentality. In Hwa Yol Jung (Ed.), Comparative political culture in the age of globalization: An introductory anthology (pp. 251–266). Lanham, MD: Lexington Books.
- Tu, Weiming. (2008). Mutual learning as an agenda for social development. In Molefi Kete Asante, Yoshitaka Miike, & Jing Yin (Eds.), The global intercultural communication reader (pp. 329–333). New York, NY: Routledge.
- Tu, Weiming. (2008). Rooted in humanity, extended to heaven: The "anthropocosmic" vision in Confucian thought. Harvard Divinity Bulletin, 36(2), 58–68.
- Tu, Weiming. (2009). Confucian humanism as a spiritual resource for global ethics. Peace and Conflict Studies, 16(1), 1–8.
- Tu, Weiming. (2012). A spiritual turn in philosophy: Rethinking the global significance of Confucian humanism. Journal of Philosophical Research, 37, 389–401.
- Tu, Weiming. (2014). The context of dialogue: Globalization and diversity. In Molefi Kete Asante, Yoshitaka Miike, & Jing Yin (Eds.), The global intercultural communication reader (2nd ed., pp. 496–514). New York, NY: Routledge.
