= Boston Confucians =

American Confucian group

The Boston Confucians are a group of New Confucians from Boston, of whom the best known are Tu Wei-Ming of Harvard, John Berthrong and Robert Neville of Boston University. Boston Confucianism belongs to the larger discussion of what it means to study and practice Confucianism in a context outside China and East Asia and the significance of Confucianism for modern-day American life.

== Boston Confucianism ==
Boston Confucianism refers to those who hold that Confucianism could be successfully adapted to a Western perspective. Confucianism is seen as a tradition with rich spiritual and cultural resources that can inform other world traditions. Boston Confucianism also argues for the transportability of Confucianism to geographical locations beyond Asia proper. The internationalized character of Boston Confucianism is to a great extent a central feature in the second generation of the New Confucians. Both Platonism and Christianity began as such portable traditions, which could be practiced outside of the Greek and Jewish roots which originally generated them.

However, this is a view that is common to New Confucians in general, whether from Boston, Beijing, Taipei, Hong Kong or Singapore. Indeed, there are contemporary advocates of Confucianism who are not New Confucians, but who would agree that Confucianism is not geographically or culturally parochial, any more than Buddhism or Islam have been. Philip J. Ivanhoe, Joel J. Kupperman and David B. Wong would fall into this latter category. Consequently, "Boston Confucian" is a term more closely linked to geography than intellectual content. Boston Confucianism seeks to explore different applications of Confucianism in the age of globalization.

The school of Boston Confucianism has become especially well known in academic circles in China. Chinese scholars see it as the first indication of Confucianism's ability to be enthusiastically endorsed by non-Asian North-American scholars and theologians for non-academic purposes.

Bin Song, who received a Ph.D. from Boston University and now teaches at Washington College, has published a range of articles in The Huffington Post about Boston Confucianism.

== Key texts ==
In his 1988 essay "The Meaning of Life", Tu Wei-ming (1988) wrote:

Copernicus decentered the earth, Darwin relativized the god-like image of man, Marx exploded the ideology of social harmony, and Freud complicated our conscious life. They have redefined humanity for the modern age. Yet they have also empowered us, with a communal, critical self-awareness, to renew our faith in the ancient Confucian wisdom that the globe is the center of our universe and the only home for us, and that we are the guardians of the good earth, the trustees of the mandate of Heaven that enjoins us to make our bodies healthy, our hearts sensitive, our minds alert, our souls refined and our spirits brilliant [...] We are here because embedded in our human nature is the secret code for heaven’s self-realization. Heaven is certainly omnipresent, may even be omniscient, but is most likely not omnipotent. It needs our active participation to realize its own truth. We are heaven’s partners, indeed co creators. We serve heaven with common sense, the lack of which nowadays has brought us to the brink of self-destruction. Since we help heaven to realize itself through our self-discovery and self-understanding in day-to-day living, the ultimate meaning of life is found in our ordinary human existence.

"The Western Inscription" by the 11th century Confucian Chang Tsai is a favorite of the Boston Confucians, according to John Berthrong, as it points toward ecological concerns:

Heaven is my father and earth is my mother, and even such a small creature as I finds an intimate place in their midst. Therefore, that which extends throughout the universe I regard as my body and that which directs the universe I consider as my nature. All people are my brothers and sisters and all things are my companions. Respect the aged [...] Show affection toward the orphaned and weak [...] The sage identifies his character with Heaven and earth, and the virtuous man is best {among the children of Heaven and earth}. Even those who are tired and infirm, crippled and sick, those who have no brothers or children, wives or husbands, are all my brothers who are in distress and have no one to turn to.

== See also ==
- List of ethicists
