= Hsu Fu-kuan =

Taiwanese philosopher (c. 1903–1982)

Xu Fuguan (Hsu Fu-kuan)
- 徐復觀
- Xu circa 1960
- Born: 31 January 1904; Xishui County, Hubei, Qing Empire
- Died: 1 April 1982 (aged 78); Taipei, Taiwan
- Occupations: Historian, philosopher

Philosophical work
- Era: 20th-century philosophy
- Region: Chinese philosophy
- School: New Confucianism
- Main interests: Confucianism; History of Chinese philosophy

Hsu Fu-kuan
- Traditional Chinese: 徐復觀
- Simplified Chinese: 徐复观
Transcriptions
Standard Mandarin
- Hanyu Pinyin: Xú Fùguān
- Wade–Giles: Hsu Fu-kuan

Hsu Fu-kuan or Xu Fuguan (Chinese: 徐復觀; 1902/03 – 1982) was a Chinese historian and philosopher who made notable contributions to Confucian studies. He is a leading member of New Confucianism, a philosophical movement initiated by Xu's teacher and friend, Xiong Shili. Other important members of the New Confucian Movement include Xu's two friends and professorial colleagues who also studied with Xiong Shili: Mou Zongsan and Tang Junyi.

== Biography ==
Xu was born January 31, 1903, in a family of farmers and scholars in Hubei Province, China. Hsu's father taught at a private school established for village children who showed academic promise and could sit the imperial examinations to become scholar officials. In his teen-age years, Xu made his way to the provincial capital Wuhan which was then the cultural center where foreign influences and trends abounded. Wuhan was also an important staging area for the 1911 Republican Revolution that ended China's 2000-year-old imperial rule. Xu spent fifteen years with the Nationalist army attaining the rank of senior colonel. Trusted by Kuomintang leader Chiang Kai-shek, Xu was sent to Yan'an to discuss Nationalist and Communist cooperation against the invading Japanese. In Yan'an, Xu met senior Communist officials including Mao Zedong and Zhou Enlai.

After leaving the army, Xu then took various teaching positions, published a scholarly magazine, and then involved himself in politics, working as an advisor to Chiang Kai-shek until 1946. He then devoted himself to "the study of books" (editing academic papers) on the island of Taiwan where the Nationalists had retreated in 1949. Between 1955 and 1969, he taught in the Chinese Department of Tunghai University. Because the university had no philosophy department, Xu welcomed students interested in philosophy into the Chinese Department. Many of these students, such as Tu Weiming, rose to academic prominence. Xu also taught at the New Asia Research Institute in Hong Kong and helped found New Asia Middle School.

Xu had served on Chiang Ka-shek's staff after the war, and suggested that he carry out a land reform program. But on Taiwan he grew disillusioned that Chiang did not adopt the democratic system but instead designated his son as his successor and asked Xu to pledge his loyalty. In 1957, according to his son, Hsu Woo-chun, the Nationalists became irritated at his criticisms and forced him out of the party, and in 1969 Tunghai forced him to retire. He then went to Hong Kong, where his main source of income was his writings. More than half of the pieces he wrote were composed in Hong Kong.

Xu was a prolific writer and wide-ranging thinker and his collected works run to several volumes. In both Taiwan and Hong Kong, Xu wrote both for newspapers and also his scholarly peers. Xu was the driving force behind the 1958 manifesto on Chinese Culture that is viewed by many scholars as a crowning achievement of New Confucianism. Regarding this manifesto, Xinzhong Yao states: "The first effort in reviving Confucianism in the 1950s was a document drawn up by Tang Junyi, Mou Zongsan, Zhang Junmai and Xu Fuguan and published on the first day of 1958, entitled 'A Declaration of Chinese Culture to the Scholars of the World' (wei zhongguo wenhua jinggao shijie renshi xuanyan 为中国文化敬告世界人士宣言). The declaration restates the authors' concerns about the direction of human development, the value of Chinese culture, and urges Western and Chinese scholars to understand Chinese culture, claiming that without a proper understanding of Chinese culture, the perception of China will be distorted and the Chinese will have no future."

In the years of Opening and Reform in China, he believed that Deng Xiaoping was the right man to transform China. He did not accept the invitation to visit Beijijng, however.

Xu died in Hong Kong in 1982.

== Xu’s Interpretation of Chinese History and Philosophy ==
=== Chinese Humanistic Spirit ===
==== “Concerned Consciousness” ====
Xu believes that the emphasis of moral self-cultivation in Confucianism is the manifestation of Chinese humanistic spirit. According to Xu, the basic attribute of Chinese tradition is its origin in anxiety (youhuan yishi), whereas the beginning of Western tradition is in curiosity. Although Xu claims that every civilization first begins with the fear of deities, he also believes that the essence of a civilization then diverges its focus into different core values based on the development of distinctive emotions. The sense of anxiety leads Chinese tradition to value self-discovery and moral virtue rather the pursuit of knowledge in the external world. Respectively, Xu provides the examples of ancient Greek culture pursuing knowledge as a leisure activity leading to the development of science and technology, while people in the Zhou dynasty stresses on self-reliance and autonomy of oneself and thus leading to the creation of virtue based moral systems:

"During the Zhou dynasty (1459–249 BC), the preoccupation with earthly matters had started: the spirit of self-conscience was beginning to work and those people developed clear will and purpose. They were moving progressively from the realm of religion to the realm of ethics. Since that early stage, the Chinese people were free from metaphysical concerns. Unlike the Greeks, who at the same critical stage in history moved from religion to metaphysics, the Chinese moved from religion to ethics."

Xu defines the sense of anxiety as feeling responsible in overcoming difficulties by one's own efforts. Xu further explains this concept as being concerned of the responsibility for improving one's own moral quality to achieve autonomy and freedom. In contrast to religion, rather than placing one's dependency and sense of responsibility to a deity, ancient Chinese culture stresses on the cultivation of one's heart mind and developing self-reliance, and as a result, developed their own ethical and moral systems.

The attainment of the sense of anxiety in ancient Chinese culture transform itself from a culture of religion in the Shang dynasty to a humanistic society in the Zhou dynasty. First, Xu points out that the extrication of religion begin when ancient Chinese people gradually discovered that human virtue and human efforts superseded spiritual beings or deities. Specifically, Xu provides the example that people used to believe in supporting every ruler as being appointed by the ultimate authority of the Mandate of Heaven. However, as people of Zhou became anxious of certain unjust rulers who are not in accord with the will of the people, they declared that the Mandate of Heaven can be passed down to a more suitable ruler with superior and defining moral characteristics. As a result, people developed responsibility to the problems occurring in their own society and they developed self-dependency. Thus, ancient Chinese virtues that stresses on the importance of regulating society and human relations such as jing (reverence), li (rules of propriety), and ren (human heartedness, mutuality) as a means to focus on real world issues by creating self-existing moral laws.

==== “Bodily Recognition” and Moral Subjectivity ====
Similar to Mencius, Xu believes that the nature of all human being is good and one can realize their own good nature through “bodily recognition” (tiren)--or gongfu in Neo-Confucianism terminology. “Bodily recognition” is a retrospective process in which the subject discover moral subjectivity by bringing one's experiences to their heart mind and see whether they are able to take the feelings or ideas at ease or not. Although this might suggest a hedonistic approach for discovering one's own moral subjectivity, Xu maintains that “bodily recognition” involves the use of reflective reasoning and the reduction of sensual desires. Xu follows Mencius's distinction between a great man (junzi) and a small man (xiaoren) in the sense that a great man relies on his heartmind rather than simply relying on one's own senses in perceiving the world. However, Xu also stresses that one must engage in a “tracing-back bodily experiencing” (zhui tiyan) process to achieve moral perfection and character transformation. He provides an example of this process in reinterpretation books, chapters sentences, and words. Ultimately, Xu believes that through “tracing-back bodily experiencing,” one is able to attain moral perfection and greater autonomy.

=== Xu’s Interpretation of Chinese Aesthetics ===
Xu asserts that technique is associated with beauty. Through the learning and mastery of technique, one is able to achieve the realm of artistic creativity, or in which one is experiencing dao. Specifically, Xu examined early Chinese aesthetic implication of Zhuangzi and thus believed that perfection of art is essential in dissolving sensual desires and allowing subjectivity to emerge. Xu analyzes the story of Cook Ding (Guo Xiang) in Zhuangzi's recession and highlights how Cook Ding not only cuts up an ox with ease and in “perfect rhythm,” but he also derives enjoyment and contentment from it. Xu claims that this state of satisfaction is the learning technique of the dao, where perception and thinking ceases and the spirit of the movement freely moves wherever it wants.

However, to achieve this state of satisfaction, Xu affirms that one must first engage in “fast the mind” or “sit in forgetfulness” (jingzuo) to get rid of the constraints in one's cravings or one's sense of “usefulness.” An instance of this is shown when Xu expressed disdain for “dark, ugly, and chaotic” of Dada art, as he disagreed with the way they expressed anger. Thus, similarly, Xu compares this notion of technique in Zhuangzi to gongfu or “bodily recognition,” in which one gains greater autonomy by overcoming sensual desires and allowing one's own subjectivity to emerge.

=== Xu’s View on Confucianism and Democracy ===
Xu makes a two-fold argument for the relationship between Confucianism and democracy: Confucianism by nature has elements of liberal democracy ideas and it has the possibility of enhancing a liberal democracy society. First, he draws Mencius’ core idea of “the people as foundation” to claim that Confucianism stresses on the importance of human dignity and equality. In this sense, Confucianism inherently has some elements of liberal democracy ideas. In addition, Xu urges that one should not mistaken Confucianism as being more consistent with despotism due to the long history of Confucian imperial rule, and instead, one should view it as being unable to develop due to historical factors. Specifically, Xu claims that the emergence of autocracy in the Qin dynasty inhibited the development of democracy in China and the value of the people. Second, Xu maintains that democracy should indeed have the rule of law, protection of freedom, and the importance of elections, and at the same time, be infused with the idea of “rule by virtue” in Confucianism. However, he believes that rules and laws should not function as consequences or punishment in coercing people to be more morally good, rather they should function as rituals in shaping a person's character. An issue Xu points out in modern liberal democracy societies is the exploitation of laws in attaining one's selfish gains. Although Xu does seem to stress on the importance in the role of the government for shaping people's character, he also believes that government should be more limited in interfering with morality, as he states that moral subjectivity is secondary and cannot replace the “primary value,” or the value of human life.

== Writings ==
- Xu, Fuguan (2022), The Chinese Liberal Spirit: Selected Writings of Xu Fuguan, edited and translated by David Elstein, Albany: SUNY Press, ISBN 9781438487175
