= Taoism and death =

Taoist understandings of death

There is significant scholarly debate about the Taoist understanding of death. The process of death itself is described as shijie or "release from the corpse", but what happens after is described variously as transformation, immortality or ascension to heaven. For example, the Yellow Emperor was said to have ascended directly to heaven in plain sight, while the thaumaturge Ye Fashan was said to have transformed into a sword and then into a column of smoke which rose to heaven.

Religious Taoism holds that the body is filled with spirits and monsters, and prescribes a number of rituals that must be performed so that these spirits are able to guard the body. When the spirits leave the body then there is nothing to protect it from illness so it weakens and dies. Taoism is also known for people believing that there is eternal life. In Taoism when one dies, if they need to be contacted it is done through meditation by an alchemist. In Taoism death is seen as just another phase in life, although many Taoists have attempted to achieve immortality. Some taoists believe if they do what they have to do and are supposed to do then when they die they will be granted immortality.

== Funeral ceremonies ==
Taoist ceremonies for the dead often include an altar upon which are placed a sacred lamp, two candles, tea, rice, and water. The sacred lamp symbolizes the light of wisdom, yet it could also be referred to as the Golden Pill or Elixir of Immortality. On each side of the lamp are two tall candles that symbolize the light of the sun, moon, and both eyes of the human body. The tea, rice and water are put in cups in front of the altar. The tea symbolizes yin, water is the energy of the yang, and rice represents the union of the yin and the yang.

Five plates of fruit are used to symbolize the five elements: wood, fire, earth, metal, and water. These elements are further equated with specific colors: green, red, yellow, white, and black. These elements all go in a cycle that when balanced ensure that the body is healthy. An incense burner is placed in the middle of the five elements. The burning of the incense represents refinement and purification of the soul, also known as the inner energies.

The ceremony usually takes place in a person's house and is held over an odd number of days, usually three, five or seven days. The candle is lit up for the body all that time before burial. During the vigil and the funeral the relatives wear white.

== Immortality ==
A widespread and major goal of most Taoists is to achieve immortality rather than enter the regular afterlife. Reaching this goal is not easy; various tasks must be met during an entire lifetime to be qualified to be immortal. The two different categories of requirements for immortality are internal alchemy and external alchemy.

External alchemy is mastering special breathing techniques, sexual practices, yoga, attempting to produce an elixir of immortality by consuming purified metals and complex compounds, and developing medical skills. In Taoism, one's soul or energy is interlocked with the vital energy, which nourishes the soul. Ridding the body of impurities can increase this energy. Aside from these requirements, it would be best to lead an upright, moral and good-hearted life.

Internal alchemy includes sophisticated visualization, strict dieting, specific sexual exercises, and self-control. A strict diet is needed to kill demons within the body and to stimulate and maintain energy. The body is purified by the consumption of refined substances such as jade or gold. The many different types of meditation all revolve around the common idea of breathing. Much of a Taoist's time is spent meditating. Carl Jung was among those who interpreted internal alchemy in a purely spiritual, rather than physical, sense.

== Focus on life ==
Taoism places great value in life. It does not focus on life after death, but on health and longevity by living a simple life and having inner peace. It is said that the human body is filled with spirits, gods, or demons. When people die, it is believed that they should do rituals to let the spirits guard the body. The spirits of the dead are routinely communicated with through the assistance of spirit-mediums. When one dies they continue to live on in the Tao.
