= Tang Chun-i =

Chinese philosopher

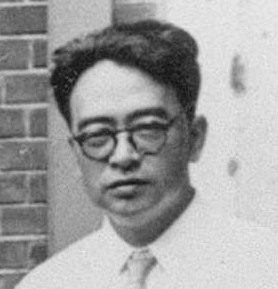
- Tang in April 1954.
- Born: 17 January 1909; Sichuan, Qing dynasty
- Died: 2 February 1978 (aged 69); Hong Kong Baptist Hospital, Kowloon, British Hong Kong
- Resting place: Chaoyang Cemetery, Taipei
- Spouse: Xie Tienguang (11 December 1916 – 24 August 2000)
- Other name: Tang Yibo 唐毅伯
- Occupation: Professor

Education
- Education: Sino-Russian University; Peking University; National Central University

Philosophical work
- Era: 20th-century philosophy
- Region: Chinese philosophy
- School: New Confucianism
- Institutions: New Asia College; National Taiwan University

Chinese name
- Traditional Chinese: 唐君毅
Transcriptions
Standard Mandarin
- Hanyu Pinyin: Táng Jūnyì
- Wade–Giles: T'ang Chün-i
Yue: Cantonese
- Yale Romanization: Tòhng Gwān ngaih
- Jyutping: Tong^{4} Gwan^{1} Ngai^{6}
- Website: www.mastertang.com

Tang Chun-I or Tang Junyi (Chinese: 唐君毅, 17 January 1909 – 2 February 1978) was a Chinese philosopher, who was one of the leading exponents of New Confucianism. He was influenced by Buddhism, Plato and Hegel, as well as by earlier Confucian thought.

== Biography ==
Tang, the son of a wealthy scholar, was the first born of six children in Sichuan, China. Tang was briefly a student of Liang Shuming before transferring to National Central University. In 1927, Tang became a follower of Xiong Shili after attending a series of lectures. He graduated from National Central University in 1933, soon after becoming a lecturer there. In 1940, Tang met his colleague and lifelong friend Mou Zongsan. In 1943 he married Tse Ting Kwong, an educational psychology graduate. 1944 he joined the National Central University Philosophy Department as a full-time professor, and later he even became head of the department. Only five years later, in 1949, Tang left mainland China to live in Hong Kong, as part of an exodus of Chinese intellectuals to the British colony.

Tang went into exile in Hong Kong in 1949, after the declaration of the People's Republic of China, living there for the rest of his life. There he helped found the New Asia College, which was integrated into the Chinese University of Hong Kong in 1963. He served as the founding chairman and the first Chair Professor of the Department of Philosophy of CUHK. Tang's time in Hong Kong was marked by his mission to salvage traditional Chinese culture in a time when China was ruled by an anti-traditionalist government. He established New Asia College, which to Tang symbolized his ambitious plan to save Chinese culture. Tang was particularly fixated on the fact that New Asia College was established exactly 2500 years after the birth of Confucius, often claiming that the timing was not merely coincidental, but significant as it marked a new era in Chinese history. In the 1970s, he became one of the members of the school board of New Asia Middle School.

His work has mainly been influential in Hong Kong, Taiwan and the United States. In 2009, a 2-metre (6 1/2 ft) bronze statue was erected in the New Asia College campus to celebrate his centenary.

== Philosophy ==
Tang is most associated with New Confucianism and Neo-Confucianism. In his study of Contemporary New Ru Learning, Fang Keli identified Tang as part of the second generation of New Confucians, along with Mou Zongsan and Xu Fuguan. In 1958 Tang, Mou, Xu, and Zhang Zhunmai co-authored A Manifesto on Chinese Culture Respectfully Announced to the People of the World. The manifesto was an effort to revive Confucianism likely directed at Chinese people who favored adopting Western values.

Tang believed the message of Confucianism was the affirmation of human life as it exists. He contrasts Confucianism with Christianity and Buddhism, religions that promote human transcendence over the physical world or the acceptance of the physical world as an illusion, respectively.

While Tang advocated for a new embrace of Confucianism, he never promoted specific political orders associated with Confucianism, nor did he propose any new political order based on his philosophies. Instead, Tang examined existing political alternatives through a Confucian lens. Liberal democracy was the political order most consistent with Confucianism because they both rest upon the idea that all humans are endowed with equal humanity.

Tang's work primarily deals with three issues: traditional Chinese philosophy, ethics and metaphysics (the two of which are fundamentally intertwined in his work), and Chinese culture.

=== Culture ===
Tang devoted much of his career to exploring how to modernize China without compromising its defining traditional values. Tang saw the individual's connection to traditional values as the way of maintaining an authentic life that would otherwise be by threatened by the emptiness of modernity.

=== Chinese philosophy ===
With regards to the question of the individual's relation to the universe, Tang concludes that regardless of one's approach, the individual and the universe are two different expressions of one ultimate harmony. In other words, distinctions between the two are always complementary in creating the harmonious whole of existence. He argues that the lack of a dualist distinction as truth is a defining trait of Chinese philosophy.

Tang was among the most prominent advocates of Neo-Confucianism in the 20th century (not to be confused with New Confucianism, which Tang was also part of). One major difference between Tang and the original Neo-Confucianists is that Tang framed his work through contrasts with Western philosophy. For example, Tang's concept of the heart-mind, a single entity responsible for cognition, emotion, and will, is an originally Neo-Confucian idea. Tang argued that the heart-mind is the key to all human understanding in his 1977 book Life, Existence, and the Horizons of the Heart-Mind.

=== Ethics and metaphysics ===
In his book Heart-Mind, Objects, and Human Life, Tang argues that the alienation experienced by people in modern societies is strongly connected to an emphasis on abstractions over concrete realities of everyday life.

Tang concludes that the metaphysical world has moral qualities because virtues help people to align themselves harmoniously with the universe. In his approach to ethics, Tang distinguishes the actual and the ethical self. The ethical self is informed by reason in order to transcend the actual self. While the actual self is bound spatially and temporally, the rational ethical self is a permanent entity in accord with truth. This is why Tang identifies the ethical self, not the actual self, as being the genuine self.

Tang attempted to systematize the moral idealism in his final book Life, Existence, and the Horizons of the Heart-Mind in 1977. He argues that the human heart-mind, the source of cognition, emotion, and will, is key to understanding the world, and that in integrating of reason and emotion, the heart-mind can respond correctly in a given situation.

==== Nine Horizons ====
The other main point of this book is the Nine Horizons, the spheres of existence that human activity engages with. The first three horizons are the objective world as perceived by heart-mind. The first horizon separates individuals. The second horizon separates categories. The third horizon identifies sequences, such as cause and effect or means and ends. The middle three horizons are concerned with self-reflection. The fourth horizon is the understanding of mutual perception between individuals. The fifth horizon is the understanding of symbols and meaning, including but not limited to mathematics and language. The sixth horizon is the understanding of moral conduct, which realizes the ideals we hold. Last three horizons unify the subjective and the objective in an effort to create value in our lives (what Tang calls the trans-subjective-objective horizons). The seventh horizon is the realization of a Monotheistic God. The eighth horizon is the realization of the emptiness of the self and of dharma. The ninth horizon is the flowing of Heavenly Virtue. Tang intentionally incorporated Abrahamic, Buddhist, and Confucian ideas of virtue into these last three horizons.

== Notes ==
=== Works cited ===
- Simionato, Alice (2019). "The Manifesto of 1958: A Discourse on Confucian Rationalism". Rivista di estetica. 72 (72): 125–138. doi:10.4000/estetica.6089.
