= Xiong Shili =

Chinese essayist and philosopher (1885-1968)

- 熊十力
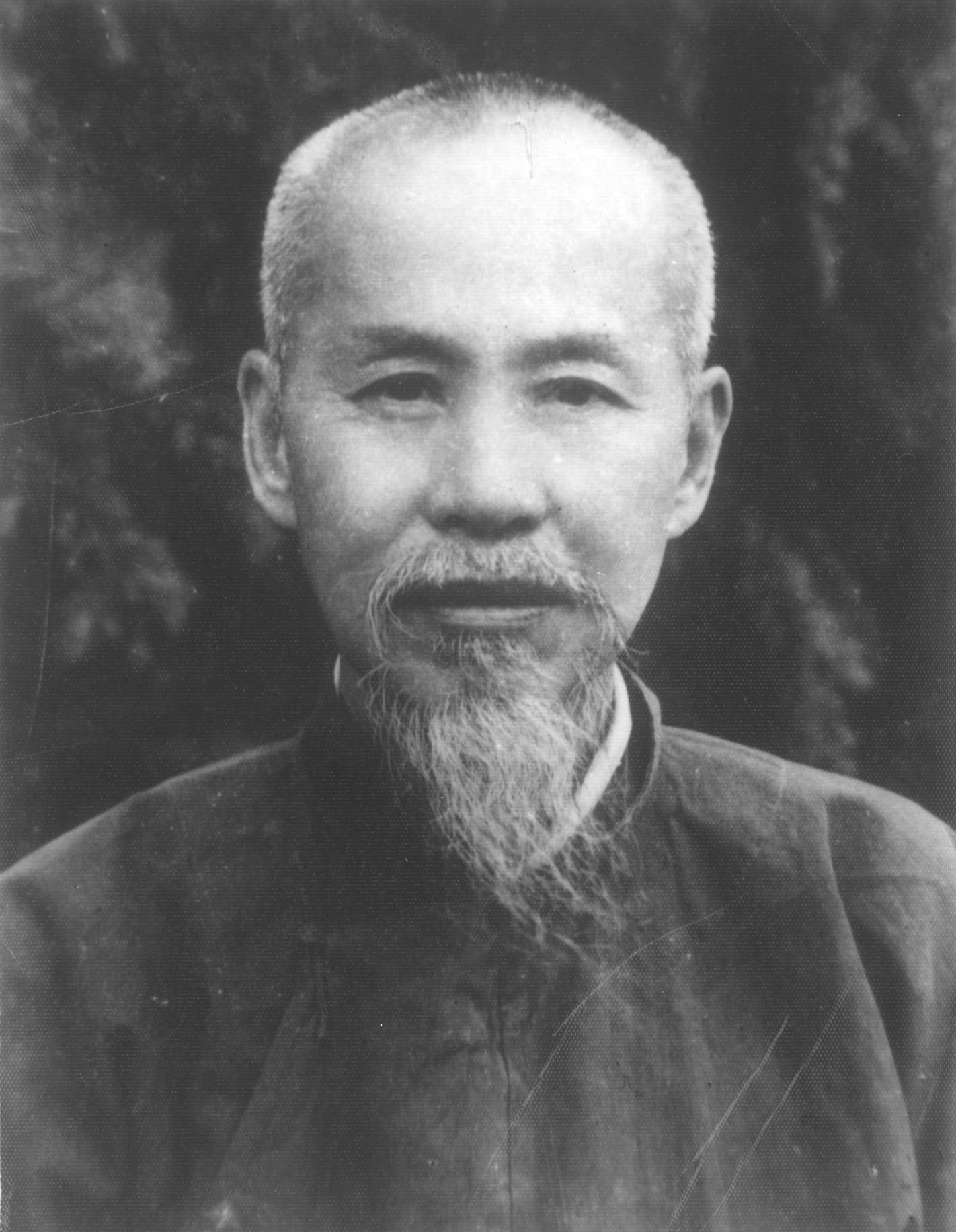
- Born: 1885; Huanggang, Hubei, Qing Empire
- Died: 23 May 1968 (aged 82–83); Shanghai, People's Republic of China

Philosophical work
- Era: 20th-century philosophy
- Region: Chinese philosophy
- School: New Confucianism
- Institutions: Tianjin Nankai High School; Peking University; Nanjing University

Xiong Shili (Chinese: 熊十力; pinyin: Xióng Shílì; Wade–Giles: Hsiung Shih-li, 1885 – May 23, 1968) was a Chinese essayist and philosopher whose major work A New Treatise on Vijñaptimātra (新唯識論, Xin Weishi Lun) is a Confucian critique of the Buddhist Vijñapti-mātra "consciousness-only" theory popularized in China by the Tang-dynasty pilgrim Xuanzang.

Xiong is widely regarded as the thinker who laid down the basis for the revival of Confucianism during the twentieth century, and the main voice in contemporary Chinese philosophy who called for a revival of the Confucian dao. He felt it could provide a guide for the country during its tumultuous period following the May Fourth Movement in 1919. He felt that national survival was predicated on a sense of community, which in turn could only come from trusting commitments from the people involved. He believed that the most urgent task for the educated elite in China was to raise the cultural awareness and sensitivity of the people that the clash between the West and China was not solely a clash of economic strength and military might, but also a conflict between basic human values. While he led a fairly secluded life throughout his career as a teacher and his association with the academic community did not begin until he was in his late thirties, his views have influenced scholars to this day.

== Biography ==
Xiong was born to a poverty-stricken family in Huanggang, Hubei. His father was a village teacher who died of tuberculosis when Xiong was ten years old, forcing him to work as a cowherd for his neighbor to support his family. By his twenties, he was a dedicated revolutionary in the Republican Revolution that ended the Qing dynasty and ushered in China's first republic. Disgusted over corruption in politics, and what he termed "latent feudalism" among the revolutionaries, he began to study Buddhism in 1920 at the China Institute for Inner Learning (支那內學院) in Nanjing headed by Ouyang Jingwu (欧阳竟无), perhaps the most influential lay Buddhist thinker of the twentieth century. At this time, the chancellor of Peking University, Cai Yuanpei, sent Liang Shuming to Nanjing to ask Ouyang Jingwu to recommend one of his students to teach Buddhist Logic (因明學, Yinming Xue) and Yogacara philosophy (唯识论) in the Philosophy Department at Peking University. Ouyang Jingwu recommended Xiong and passed Liang Shuming a draft on which Xiong had been working entitled An Outline of Consciousness-only. Impressed with Xiong's work, Cai Yuanpei, on Liang's recommendation, invited Xiong to Peking University where Xiong, much to the chagrin of Liang Shuming, destroyed his draft and instead wrote and published in 1932 what is now considered his major work A New Treatise on Consciousness-only (新唯识论, xin weishi lun). In his New Treatise, Xiong criticized the old Yogacara masters, such as the brothers Vasubandhu and Asanga (4 c.), as well as their successors, Dharmapala (530-561) and Xuanzang (c. 602–664), for their theory of seeds in which seeds, stored in the eight or 'storehouse' consciousness (alayavijnana), become discrete causal agents that 'perfume' (bring into being) all mental and physical dharmas. However, he also used the insights of Buddhism to reconstruct Confucianism. Much of his philosophy is influenced both by Buddhism and by his study of the Book of Changes, which he regarded as the fundamental classic of Confucianism.

Xiong felt that his mission was to assist China in overcoming its social and cultural crisis, and simultaneously to search for truth. He felt compelled to find and develop the dao of Confucius to meet the force of Western culture. In his outline of the main point of the New Treatise he wrote (in reply to Mou Zongsan):

Now again we are in a weak and dangerous situation. With the strong aggression of European culture, our authentic spirit has been extinct. People are accustomed to self-disregard, self-violence, self-abandonment. Everything is copied from the outside, with little self-establishment. Hence the New Treatise must be written.

The first edition of the New Treatise was written in Classical Chinese, and in 1944 Xiong published a Colloquial Chinese version which was in actuality a complete rewriting of the original work. In 1958–59 Xiong published On Original Reality and Function and Illuminating the Mind. Together, these two books form a revised account of his New Treatise.

After the founding of the People’s Republic of China, Xiong stayed on the mainland and continued to lecture at Peking University. In the 1950s, Xiong sought to reconcile Confucian teachings with socialist ideology. Invoking the concept of harmonious flows as the condition for the world's disclosure, Xiong concluded that the revolution would sweep away political conflicts and bring greater peace to humanity. He was subjected to physical abuse at the beginning of the Cultural Revolution. He died at the age of 84 in 1968.

== Philosophy ==
Xiong was a New Confucian scholar.

=== Daily decrease and daily renovation ===
Xiong's preference of Confucianism is partially because he felt that Buddhism overemphasizes the negative or passive aspects of human nature. Because of this, it fails to provide a positive and active guide to human life. This is something that Confucianism provided with its trend towards humanist thought. He labels Buddhism a learning of 'daily decrease,' a philosophy that points out the darker aspects of human nature and then directs us to eliminate it. Xiong's view of humanity was brighter. He felt that the meaning of human life is not confined to the elimination of the negative, but also involves the cultivation of the brighter aspects of human nature. He found Confucianism to uphold original human goodness; an original benevolence is insisted upon in Orthodox Confucianism. The role of the human dao is to develop this fundamental goodness. Xiong felt that the human dao lies in expanding the good root of the original mind and having it grow daily.

=== Original reality and function ===
Xiong felt that the central theory of his New Treatise was to show that original reality, (what he also refers to as ti 體 and substance), and the material world, (which he calls yong 用, or function. Cf. Ti yong) are one. The two cannot be split into separate realms. He admits that they should be described using different terms, and can be spoken of as such, but are not actually two separate entitites. Original reality is the cause of all transformations, while function is the myriad of manifestations of original reality. Original reality is hidden, function is visible. He uses the metaphor of the ocean and the waves to illustrate this point.

This is different from the notion of substance in mainstream western philosophy, which does not allow substance to embrace dynamism. Plato's Forms, for example, are static and normative. Xiong's substance changes and transforms unceasingly to become function.

"This meaning is subtle and profound. It is best illustrated in terms of the relationship between the ocean and all the waves. 1. The ocean is analogous to original reality; 2. All the water in the ocean is manifested as waves. This is analogous to original reality's manifestation as function of ten thousand things, that is, one function and another. 3. All the waves are analogous to the innumerable functions; 4. All the waves are mutually assimilable to a whole; this is analogous to the mutual assimilation of all the functions into a whole. From the above, we can see that the metaphor of the ocean and the waves best illuminates the relation between original reality and function."

The idea that reality and function are in fact, one unit, is a metaphysical claim that is key to Confucianism. This means that the phenomenal flux of change is not illusory, but is intrinsically meaningful. Thus, if original reality is in daily life, human lives should be devoted to daily cultivation in order to attain the vision of original reality.

=== Change and transformation ===
Xiong believed that the world is in a state of constant change, and that the ability of changing into all things is exactly what characterizes original reality. He also refers to original reality as "eternal transformation" or "the ability to change". Furthermore, he suggested that the perpetual transformation of original reality consists of "opening" and "closing", two tendencies of change. Closing refers to the tendency of transformation that forms things; through integration and consolidation, or materialization, various physical things are formed. Simultaneously, there is a tendency of opening. This tendency is of being strong, vigorous and not materialized. Both tendencies are indispensable, and they are responsible for the apparent distinction between matter and mind, a distinction that Xiong held is not real.

Between the two, however, Xiong refers to the opening tendency as "mind" and consciousness—the tendency in which original reality manifests its true nature. Like the Buddhist theory of Mere Consciousness, Xiong's philosophy claims consciousness as the ultimate reality. Along these lines, he considered the universe to be living and vital, not a stagnant mechanism.

=== Original reality and humanity ===
Tu Wei-Ming's essay on Xiong Shili’s quest for authentic existence, includes a quote that exemplifies where Xiong's philosophy was coming from on a personal level. He was driven by "a great wish to search for truth as a ground for 'peace of mind and a meaningful existence ...' I searched within myself with a singleness of purpose. I thought that the truth is not remote from us ... After a long time, I suddenly awoke to the realization that what I inwardly witnessed agreed entirely with the idea of 'great change' in the Confucian transmission ... hence my own understanding of Confucianism was not derived from book learning. Only after my inner experience had already embodied it did I feel that my understanding of it was in complete harmony with what was recorded in the books."

The first sentences of the New Doctrine state that "the original reality of all things is neither the objective world separate from the mind, nor that is comprehensible through knowledge; it must be comprehended through reflective seeking and confirming".

This has two important implications, one, that the human mind and original reality are not separate; and two, original reality must be grasped through reflection on what is in the human mind. Because original reality and the human mind are not separate, this means that in order to know reality, you must first get to know your own mind. This is the cultivation of virtue.

=== Habituated mind and original mind ===
For Xiong Shili, the human mind is distinguished by the habituated mind and the original mind. The habituated mind is the mind of thought, emotions, and the will. It is inclined to see the world as external to the self and is motivated by self-desires. Additionally, it uses "calculative understanding", which is a method of thinking that is deliberative and logical, bound to scientific rationality and sense experience. In contrast, the original mind is our real nature, at one with reality. It uses "nature understanding", which is an inward process of intuitive experiencing that points back to the mind itself to discover the original reality within it. Xiong speaks of calculative understanding as fit for seeking reason in the external world, the physical world. He states that we must use it carefully, and if we take original reality as an external object to infer and inquire into, then it is fundamentally wrong. He says that original reality can be comprehended, differing from Kant on this point. He stated that we must realize that original reality is in each one of us, and that we cannot seek to know it in external things. We must turn inward and allow original reality to present itself.

== Major works ==
- A New Treatise on Consciousness-only (新唯識論)
- A Refutation of the Refutation of the New Treatise on Consciousness-only (破破新唯識論)
- Origins of Confucianism (源儒)
- Essay on Substance and Function (體用論)
- Essential Sayings of Shili (十力語要)
- First Continuation of the Essential Sayings of Shili (十力語要初續)
- Essentials for Reading the Classics (讀經示要)
- A Comprehensive Explanation of Buddhist Terms (佛家明相通釋)
- On Change (乾坤衍)
- Conservative Buddhist Clandestine Opposition to Xuan Zang During the Tang Dynasty (唐世佛學舊派反對玄奘之暗潮)
