= List of philosophy awards =

This list of philosophy awards is an index to articles about notable awards related to philosophy. The list shows the country of the organization giving the award. Many of the awards are not limited to people from this country.

Country	Award	Sponsor	Given for
International	Avicenna Prize	UNESCO	Individuals and groups in the field of ethics in science
United States	Barwise Prize	American Philosophical Association	Significant and sustained contributions to areas relevant to philosophy and computing
United States	Berggruen Prize	Berggruen Institute	Thinkers whose ideas have helped us find direction, wisdom, and improved self-understanding in a world being rapidly transformed by profound social, technological, political, cultural, and economic change
Belgium	Cardinal Mercier Prize for International Philosophy	Université catholique de Louvain	Contribution to international philosophy
United States	Cecil Hemley Memorial Award	Poetry Society of America	Lyric poem that addresses a philosophical or epistemological concern
Europe	E. W. Beth Dissertation Prize	Association for Logic, Language and Information	Outstanding PhD theses in the fields of Logic, Language, and Information
Germany	Elisabeth of Bohemia Prize	Bielefeld University	Internationally recognized philosopher for outstanding services to research on women in the history of philosophy
Portugal	Fernando Gil International Prize for the Philosophy of Science	Government of Portugal	Work of particular excellence in the domain of philosophy of science, whether regarding general epistemological problems or particular scientific areas
Germany	Friedrich Nietzsche Prize	Saxony-Anhalt	German-language essayistic or philosophical work
Belgium	Golden Eurydice Award	International Forum for Biophilosophy	Outstanding contribution, or contributions over a period, in the field of biophilosophy
United States	Hempel Award	Philosophy of Science Association	Lifetime achievement in the philosophy of science
Norway	Holberg Prize	Norway	Outstanding scholars for work in the arts, humanities, social sciences, law and theology, either within one of these fields or through interdisciplinary work
United States	John Fisher award	American Society for Aesthetics	Original essay in aesthetics
Germany	Karl Jaspers Prize	City of Heidelberg, Heidelberg University	Scientific work of international significance supported by philosophical spirit
United States	Kluge Prize	John W. Kluge Center at the Library of Congress	Deep intellectual accomplishment in the human sciences
Japan	Kyoto Prize in Arts and Philosophy	Inamori Foundation	Lifetime achievements in the arts and philosophy
Switzerland	Lakatos Award	Latsis Foundation	Outstanding contribution to the philosophy of science, widely interpreted
Germany	Meister Eckhart Prize	Identity Foundation	Thinkers who produce high-quality work on the subject of identity
United States	Monograph prize	American Society for Aesthetics	Outstanding monograph in the philosophy of art or aesthetics
United States	Nicholas Rescher Prize for Systematic Philosophy	University of Pittsburgh	Philosophers who have addressed the historical “big questions” of the field in ways that nevertheless command the respect of specialists
France	Jean Nicod Prize	French National Centre for Scientific Research	Leading philosopher of mind or philosophically oriented cognitive scientist
United States	Philosopher's Annual	Philosopher's Annual	Ten best articles published in philosophy each year
Sweden	Rolf Schock Prizes	Swedish Royal Academies	Logic and Philosophy
Germany	Sigmund Freud Prize	Deutsche Akademie für Sprache und Dichtung	Scientific prose
United Kingdom	Sir Henry Jones Memorial Prize	University of Glasgow	Moral and political philosophy
Canada	Symposium Book Award	Symposium: Canadian Journal of Continental Philosophy	Books on continental philosophy
Czech Republic	The VIZE 97 Prize	Dagmar and Václav Havel Foundation VIZE 97	People who through their work cross the traditional framework of scientific knowledge, contribute to the understanding of science as an integral part of general culture, and in an unconventional way deal with the fundamental questions of knowledge, being and human existence
United States	Weizenbaum Award	International Society for Ethics and Information Technology	Individual who has “made a significant contribution to the field of information and computer ethics, through his or her research, service, and vision
