= Thing theory =

Branch of critical theory

Thing theory is a branch of critical theory that focuses on human–object interactions in literature and culture. It borrows from Heidegger's distinction between objects and things, which posits that an object becomes a thing when it can no longer serve its common function. The thing in Thing Theory is conceptually like Jacques Lacan's Real. Felluga states that it is influenced by Actor-network theory and the work of Bruno Latour.

For University of Chicago Professor Bill Brown, objects are items for which subjects have a known and clear sense of place, use and role. Things, on the other hand, manifest themselves once they interact with our bodies unexpectedly, break down, malfunction, shed their encoded social values, or elude our understanding. When one encounters an object which breaks outside of its expected, recognizable use, it causes a moment of judgement, which in turn causes a historical or narrative reconfiguration between the subject and the object which Brown refers to as thingness. The theory was largely created by Prof. Brown, who edited a special issue of Critical Inquiry on it in 2001 and published a monograph on the subject entitled A Sense of Things.

As Brown writes in his essay "Thing Theory":

We begin to confront the thingness of objects when they stop working for us: when the drill breaks, when the car stalls, when the window gets filthy, when their flow within the circuits of production and distribution, consumption and exhibition, has been arrested, however momentarily. The story of objects asserting themselves as things, then, is the story of a changed relationship to the human subject and thus the story of how the thing really names less an object than a particular subject-object relation. As they circulate through our lives, we look through objects (to see what they disclose about history, society, nature, or culture - above all, what they disclose about us), but we only catch a glimpse of things.

Thingness can also extend to close interactions with the subject's body. Brown points to encounters like "cut[ing] your finger on a sheet of paper" or "trip[ping] over some toy" to argue that we are "caught up in things" and the "body is a thing among things."

== Applications ==
Thing theory is particularly well suited to the study of modernism, due to the materialist preoccupations of modernist poets such as William Carlos Williams, who declared that there should be "No ideas but in things" or T. S. Eliot's idea of the objective correlative. Thing theory has also found a home in the study of contemporary Maker culture, which applies Brown's aesthetic theories to material practices of misuse. Recent critics have also applied Thing Theory to hoarding practices.

Thing Theory also has potential applications in the field of anthropology. Brown refers to Cornelius Castoriadis, who notes how perceptions of objects vary in cross-cultural communication. Castoriadis states that the "perception of things" for an individual from one society, for instance, will be the perception of things "inhabited" and "animated". Whereas an individual from another society may view things as "inert instruments, objects of possession". Brown remarks that thingness can result when an object from a previous historical epoch is viewed in the present. He states that "however materially stable objects may seem, they are, let us say, different things in different scenes". He cites Nicholas Thomas, who writes: "As socially and culturally salient entities, objects change in defiance of their material stability. The category to which a thing belongs, the emotion and judgment it prompts, and narrative it recalls, are all historically refigured."

Brown remarks how Thing Theory can be applied to understand perceptions of technological changes. He uses the example of a confused museum goer seeing Claes Oldenburg's Typewriter Eraser, Scale X and asking "How did that form ever function?" In this sense, Oldenburg's deliberate attempt to turn an object into a thing 'expresses the power of this particular work to dramatize a generational divide and to stage (to melodramatize, even) the question of obsolescence.'

== Criticism ==
Critics including Severin Fowles of Columbia University and architect Thom Moran at the University of Michigan have begun to organize classes on "Thing Theory" in relation to literature and culture. Fowles describes a blind spot in Thing Theory, which he attributes to a post-human, post-colonialist attention to physical presence. It fails to address the influence of "non-things, negative spaces, lost or forsaken objects, voids or gaps – absences, in other words, that also stand before us as entity-like presences with which we must contend." For example, Fowles explains how a human subject is required to understand the difference between a set of keys and a missing set of keys, yet this anthropocentric awareness is absent from Thing Theory.
