= Bill Brown (critical theory) =

American academic (21st century)

Bill Brown is the Karla Scherer distinguished service professor in American culture at the University of Chicago, where he teaches in the department of English language and literature, the department of visual arts, and the college. He previously held the Edward Carson Waller distinguished service professorship in humanities and the George M. Pullman professorship, and served as the chair of the University's English language and literature department from 2006-2008. After a brief term as the deputy dean for academic and research initiatives in the division of the humanities, Brown was recruited to be the new deputy provost for the arts in 2014. As deputy provost, Brown oversees the programming and future of UChicago Arts, serves on the arts steering committee, and chairs the UChicago art institutions subcommittee. He also serves on a number of other committees across campus - including the executive committee of the Karla Scherer Center for the Study of American Culture - and is the principal investigator for the object cultures project at The Chicago Center for Contemporary Theory (3CT). He has co-edited the University of Chicago's peer-reviewed literary journal, Critical Inquiry, since 1993.

Professor Brown's work focuses on American literature, with his second book, A Sense of Things, looking at the representation of objects in 19th-century American literature. His interests have since progressed to modernism. He also has a long-standing interest in popular culture, and has written about Toy Story and Westerns, among other facets of American life. His major theoretical work, however, is on Thing theory, which borrows from Heidegger's object/thing distinction to look at the role of objects that have become manifest in a way that sets them apart from the world in which they exist. He edited a special issue of Critical Inquiry on this subject, which won the CELJ award for Best Special Issue of an academic journal in 2002. His essay, "The Dark Wood of Postmodernity: Space, Faith, Allegory," which treats religious themes in the work of Marxian cultural theorist Frederic Jameson and in postmodern culture generally, was awarded the Modern Language Association's William Riley Parker Prize in 2005.

Brown has a B.A. from Duke University, an M.A. in creative writing (poetry) from Stanford University, and a Ph.D. from Stanford University's Modern Thought and Literature program. He has been teaching at the University of Chicago since 1989.

== Selected publications ==
- Other Things (The University of Chicago Press, 2015)
- "The Obsolescence of the Human," Cultures of Obsolescence (Palgrave, forthcoming, 2015)
- "The Recentness of Things," And Another Thing (2014)
- "The Origin of the American Work of Art," American Literary History (Winter 2013)
- "Anarchéologie: Object Culture, Circa Now," The Way of the Shovel (Chicago Museum of Contemporary Art, 2013)
- "The Bodies of Things," Bodies and Things in Nineteenth-Century Writing (2012)
- "Commodity Nationalism and the Lost Object," The Pathos of Authenticity (2010)
- "Textual Materialism," PMLA (January 2010)
- "Objects, Other, and Us (The Re-fabrication of Things)," Critical Inquiry (2010)
- "Counting (Arts and Disciplines)," Critical Inquiry (2009)
- "Materiality," Critical Terms for Media Studies (Chicago, 2009)
- "Now Advertising: Late James," Henry James Review (2009)
- "Reweaving the Carpet," New Literary History (2009)
- "Object Relations in an Expanded Field," differences (Fall 2006)
- "Reification, Reanimation, and the American Uncanny," Critical Inquiry (Winter 2005)
- "The Dark Wood of Postmodernity: Space, Faith, Allegory," PMLA (May 2005)
- "The Matter of Dreiser's Modernity," The Cambridge Companion to Theodore Dreiser (2004)
- A Sense of Things: The Object Matter of American Literature (University of Chicago Press, 2003)
- "The Secret Life of Things: Virginia Woolf and the Matter of Modernism," Aesthetic Subjects (Minnesota, 2003)
- Things, a special issue of Critical Inquiry (Fall 2001)
- "How To Do Things With Things-A Toy Story," in Critical Inquiry (Summer 1998)
- Reading the West: An Anthology of Dime Novels (Bedford Books, 1997)
- "Global Bodies / Postnationalities: Charles Johnson's Consumer Culture," Representations (Spring 1997)
- The Material Unconscious: American Amusement, Stephen Crane, and the Economies of Play (Harvard, 1996)
- "Science Fiction, the World's Fair, and the Prosthetics of Empire, 1910-1915," Cultures of U.S. Imperialism (Duke, 1993)
- "The Meaning of Baseball in 1992 (With Notes on the Post-American)," Public Culture (Fall 1991)
