= Kluge Scholars' Council =

Body of scholars convened by the Librarian of Congress

The Kluge Scholars Council is a body of distinguished scholars, convened by the Librarian of Congress to advise on matters related to scholarship at the Library, with special attention to the John W. Kluge Center and the Kluge Prize. According to the Library of Congress, the Council aims, through discussion, to continue an American tradition of linking thinkers and doers: those engaged in the world of ideas with those engaged in the world of affairs.

Members of the Scholars Council are appointed by the Librarian of Congress. Council members serve a five-year term, renewable once.

== Current members ==
- Margaret MacMillan is the visiting distinguished historian at the Council on Foreign Relations. She is an emeritus professor of international history at Oxford and a professor of history at the University of Toronto.
- John Witte Jr. is Jonas Robitscher Professor of Law, Alonzo L. McDonald Distinguished Service Professor, and director of the Center for the Study of Law and Religion Center at Emory University.
- Toyin Falola is a professor African Studies, Jacob & Frances Sanger Mossiker Chair in the Humanities, and University Distinguished Teaching Professor at the University of Texas at Austin.
- Ruth Faden is the founder of the Johns Hopkins Berman Institute of Bioethics as well as the inaugural Philip Franklin Wagley Professor of Biomedical Ethics.
- Lisa Anderson is an American political scientist and former president of the American University in Cairo.
- Manuel Castells is university professor and the Wallis Annenberg Chair in Communication Technology and Society at the University of Southern California, Los Angeles.
- Dame Wendy Hall is professor of computer science and a director of the Web Science Institute at the University of Southampton.
- Gideon Rose has been editor of Foreign Affairs since 2010, after serving as managing editor of the magazine from 2000-2010.
- Jane Dammen McAuliffe is a senior fellow at the Berkley Center for Religion, Peace and World Affairs at Georgetown University, former president of Bryn Mawr College and a former senior official at the Library of Congress.
- Beth Simone Noveck is a professor in culture, technology, and society at NYU and directs the Governance Lab (GovLab) and its MacArthur Research Network on Opening Governance.
- Debra Satz is the Vernon R. and Lysbeth Anderson Dean for the Humanities and Sciences at Stanford University and the Marta Sutton Weeks Professor of Ethics in Society.
- Christine L. Borgman is distinguished professor and presidential chair in information studies at University of California, Los Angeles.
- Theda Skocpol is the Victor S. Thomas Professor of Government and Sociology at Harvard University, where she has also served as dean of the graduate school and as director of the Center for American Political Studies.

== Former members ==
- Bernard Bailyn (1922-2020) was Adams University Professor Emeritus at Harvard University and Director of the International Seminar on the History of the Atlantic World.
- Baruch Blumberg (1925-2011) was Senior Advisor for Biology to the Administrator of NASA and Director of the Astrobiology Institute.
- Judith Margaret Brown was Beit Professor of Commonwealth History at Oxford and a Fellow of Balliol College.
- Sara Castro-Klaren is a professor of Latin American Culture and Literature at Johns Hopkins University.
- Jean Bethke Elshtain (1941-2013) was the Laura Spelman Rockefeller Professor of Social and Political Ethics in the Divinity School at the University of Chicago.
- Robert William Fogel (1926-2013) was the Charles R. Walgreen Distinguished Service Professor of American Institutions in the Graduate School of Business, director of the Center for Population Economics, and a member of the Department of Economics and of the Committee on Social Thought at the University of Chicago.
- Bronislaw Geremek (1932-2008) was the former Foreign Minister of Poland and a scholar of medieval European history especially of France and Poland.
- Philip W. Gold M.D., is chief of the clinical research program of the Clinical Neuroendocrinology Branch (CNE) at the National Institute of Health.
- Toru Haga is president and professor of comparative literature and culture at the Kyoto University of Art and Design and professor emeritus of the University of Tokyo and International Research Center for Japanese Studies.
- Hugh Heclo (1943-2017) was the Clarence J. Robinson Professor of Public Affairs at George Mason University.
- Gertrude Himmelfarb was distinguished professor of history at the Graduate School of the City University of New York.
- Vyacheslav Ivanov is a linguist of global reach and currently a professor at UCLA.
- Bruce Mazlish has been Professor of History at MIT since 1950.
- Walter A. McDougall is a Pulitzer Prize-winning historian and Alloy-Ansin Professor of International Relations at the University of Pennsylvania.
- Jaroslav Jan Pelikan (1923-2006) was Sterling Professor of History at Yale University.
- John Searle was a professor of philosophy at the University of California at Berkeley since 1959.
- Amartya Sen is Lamont University Professor Emeritus, Harvard University.
- Wole Soyinka is Robert W. Woodruff Professor of the Arts at Emory University, Atlanta, and, since 2000, he is also the Director of Literary Arts, University of Nevada
- James Turner is the Reverend John J. Cavanaugh, C.S.C. Professor of Humanities at the University of Notre Dame and founding Director of the Erasmus Institute.
- Mario Vargas Llosa a writer of historical fiction and a major figure in contemporary Latin American letters, is the first occupant of the Ibero-American Literature and Culture Chair at Georgetown University.
- William Julius Wilson is Lewis P. and Linda L. Geyser University Professor at Harvard University's John F. Kennedy School of Government.
- M. Crawford Young (1931-2020) was Professor Emeritus of Political Science at the University of Wisconsin.
- Pauline Yu is president of the American Council of Learned Societies.
