= Seyla Benhabib =

American philosopher and political scientist

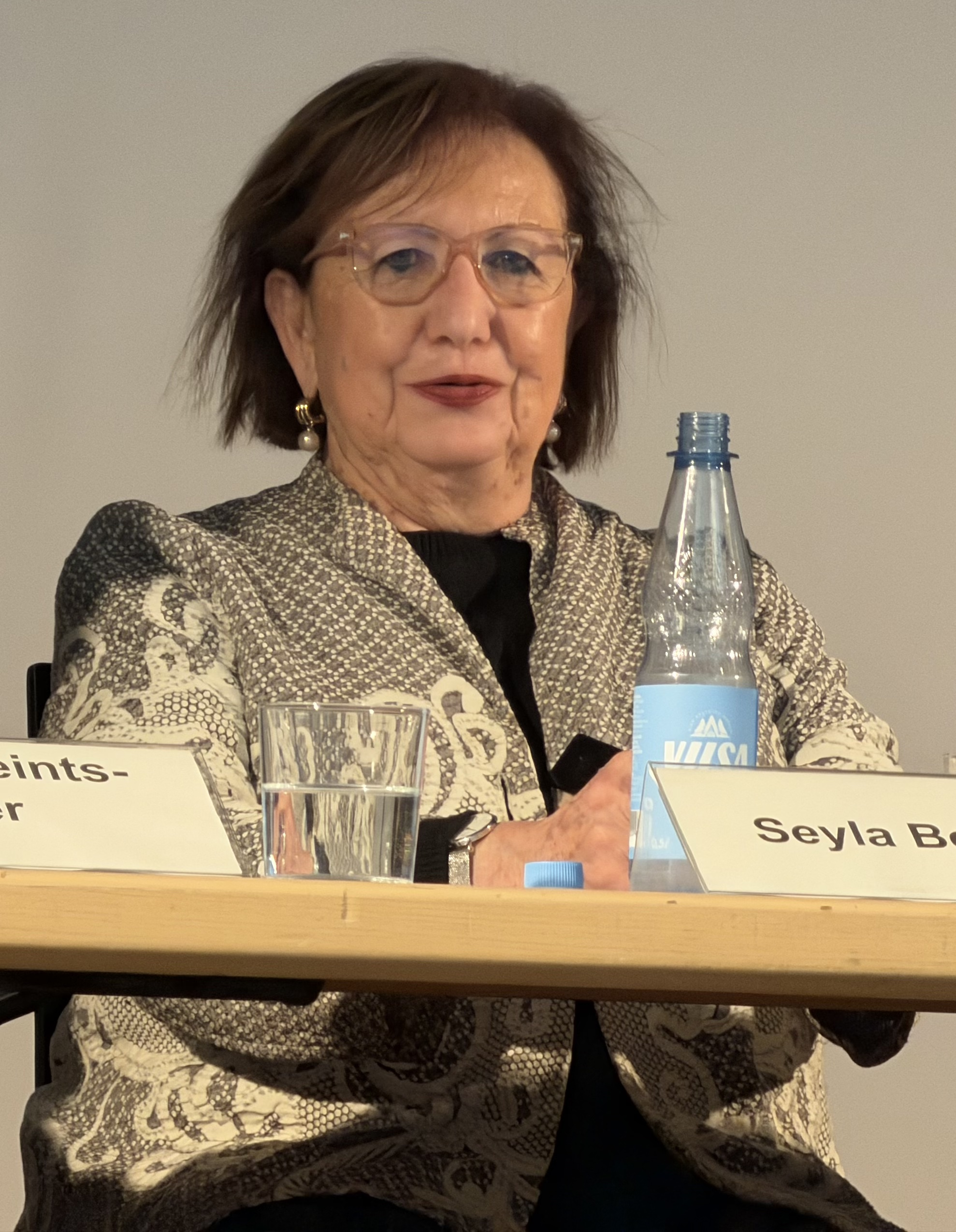
- Born: September 9, 1950 (age 76); Istanbul, Turkey
- Awards: Johan Skytte Prize in Political Science (2026)

Education
- Education: Brandeis University (BA); Yale University (MA, PhD)
- Thesis: Natural Right and Hegel: An Essay in Modern Political Theory (1977)
- Doctoral advisor: John Edwin Smith

Philosophical work
- Era: Contemporary philosophy
- Region: Western philosophy
- School: Critical theory; Feminist philosophy
- Institutions: Yale University
- Main interests: Political theory (especially democratic politics and human migration); Discourse ethics; Identity
- Notable ideas: Reconciliation of cosmopolitanism and pluralism
- Website: Official website

Seyla Benhabib (/ˈseɪlə ˌbɛnhəˈbiːb/; born September 9, 1950) is a Turkish-born American philosopher. Benhabib is a senior research scholar and adjunct professor of law at Columbia Law School. She is also an affiliate faculty member in the Columbia University Department of Philosophy and a senior fellow at the Columbia Center for Contemporary Critical Thought. She was a scholar in residence at the Law School from 2018 to 2019 and was also the James S. Carpentier Visiting professor of law in spring 2019. She was the Eugene Mayer Professor of Political Science and Philosophy at Yale University from 2001 to 2020. She was director of the program in Ethics, Politics, and Economics from 2002 to 2008. Benhabib is well known for her work in political philosophy, which draws on critical theory and feminist political theory. She has written extensively on the philosophers Hannah Arendt and Jürgen Habermas, as well as on the topic of human migration. She is the author of numerous books, and has received several prestigious awards and lectureships in recognition of her work.

== Life ==
Born in Istanbul, Benhabib was educated at English-language schools in that city. She received her high school diploma in 1970 from Robert College, then called the American College for Girls in Istanbul, before leaving for the United States. She received a B.A. from Brandeis University in 1972 and a Ph.D. from Yale in 1977. She traces her family history back to the 1492 expulsion of Jews from Spain on the "second reconquista".

Benhabib taught in the departments of philosophy at Boston University, SUNY Stony Brook, the New School for Social Research, and the Department of Government at Harvard University, before taking her current position at Yale. She has also served on editorial advisory boards for a number of journals, including Political Theory, Human Rights Review, Journal of International Political Theory, and Ethics & International Affairs. From 1986 to 1994 she was co-editor of Praxis International. In 1992, she co-founded with Andrew Arato the journal Constellations: An International Journal of Critical and Democratic Theory and served as its co-editor-in-chief until 1997. She served as President of the Eastern Division of the American Philosophical Association in 2006–2007.

Benhabib was elected a Fellow of the American Academy of Arts and Sciences in 1995. She held the Spinoza Chair of Philosophy at the University of Amsterdam in 2000 and was a Tanner Lecturer at UC, Berkeley in 2004. In the 2008–2009 academic year, she was a Fellow at the Institute for Advanced Study in Berlin (Wissenschaftskolleg zu Berlin). In 2012 she was awarded the Dr. Leopold-Lucas Prize by the University of Tübingen in recognition of outstanding achievement in the field of theology, intellectual history, historical research and philosophy, as well as the commitment to international understanding and tolerance. In 2014, she received an Honorary Doctorate of Human Letters from Georgetown University and the Meister Eckhart Prize for her work on the subject of identity. In 2024 she was awarded the Theodor W. Adorno Award. In December 2025 she was awarded the Hannah Arendt Prize for Political Thought of the Heinrich Böll Stiftung. In 2026 she was awarded the Johan Skytte Prize in Political Science and the Karl Jaspers Prize.

She has one daughter from her first marriage with the historian Wolf Schäfer and is now married to author and journalist Jim Sleeper.

== Thought ==
=== Democratic theorist ===
Democratic theorists advocate discussion within cultures and support social change. Benhabib is a liberal democratic theorist who does not believe in the purity of cultures; she thinks of them as formed through dialogues with other cultures. Human cultures are, according to Benhabib, the constant change of imaginary boundaries. They influence each other and sometimes radicalize or conform as a reaction on other cultures. Benhabib argues that in democratic theory it is assumed that every single person should be able to determine their own life. She argues that pluralism, the existence of fundamentally different cultures, is compatible with cosmopolitanism, if three conditions are fulfilled. These conditions are:

1. Egalitarian reciprocity: Members of minorities must have equal civil, political, economic and cultural rights as the majority.
2. Voluntary self-ascription: When a person is born, it should not be expected that he or she will automatically be a member of a particular religion or culture. The state should not let groups define the lives of individuals. Members of a society have the right to express themselves and it is desirable that adult individuals be asked whether they choose to continue membership in their community.
3. Freedom of exit and association: Every individual must be able to exit their group. When group members marry someone from another group, they have the right to be a member. Accommodations must be found for inter-group marriages and the resulting children.

It is contested whether cultural diversity and democratic equality can co-exist. Many cultures are not compatible with one or more of the three given conditions. For example, the first condition is violated within several cultures, such as the Kurds in Turkey or the Roma in Eastern Europe. Every nation state has groups that are not accepted by the majority. Some governments do nothing to stop discrimination against minorities. The second and third condition are also problematic. Thus, at present there seems to be no examples of states practicing a perfect version of Benhabib's system of mixing pluralism with cosmopolitanism. This does, of course, not rule out that it is possible, nor that it is a societal goal worth striving for.

=== Porous borders ===
Benhabib prefers a world with porous borders. She argues that political boundaries define some as members, but lock others out. She has written: "I think it is possible to have an empire without borders; I don't think it is possible to have a democracy without borders."

More and more people live in countries which are not their own, as state sovereignty is not as strong as in the past. Benhabib argues that somebody who is stateless is seen as an outcast and is in a way rightless. Current policy still sees national borders as a means to keep out strangers.

Benhabib's cosmopolitan view is inspired by the German philosopher Immanuel Kant. Kant's Perpetual peace concerns three articles which together are key to creating perpetual peace. In the third article Kant says that the rights of world citizens shall be limited to the right of universal hospitality. In Kant's view, every single person has the right to go wherever they like without fear of hostility from their hosts.

Benhabib takes this right as a starting point which resulted in her thoughts about migration and refugee problems. Benhabib goes further than Kant, arguing that the human right of hospitality should not apply to a single visit, but in some cases to long-term stays. For example, a country shouldn't send a refugee back when it is not sure whether they are safe in the country of origin. Nations should have obligations to exiles and refugees, and these obligations are different from the obligations to immigrants.

== Selected bibliography ==
=== Books ===
- At the Margins of the Modern State. Critical Theory and Law (Polity Press, 2025) [[ISBN 978-1-5095-6357-9]]
- Lawless Zones, Rightless Subjects (with Ayelet Shachar; Cambridge University Press, 2025) ISBN 978-1-009-51281-7
- Exile, Statelessness, and Migration: Playing Chess with History from Hannah Arendt to Isaiah Berlin (Princeton University Press, 2018)
- Toward new democratic imaginaries: İstanbul seminars on Islam, culture and politics. (Springer 2016)
- Dignity in Adversity: Human Rights in Troubled Times (Polity, 2011)
- Politics in Dark Times: Encounters with Hannah Arendt (editor; Cambridge University Press, 2010)
- Another Cosmopolitanism (Oxford University Press, 2006)
- The Rights of Others (Cambridge University Press, 2004)
- The Reluctant Modernism of Hannah Arendt (Rowman and Littlefield, 2003)
- The Claims of Culture (Princeton University Press, 2002)
- Democracy and Difference (Princeton University Press, 1996)
- Situating the Self: Gender, Community and Postmodernism in Contemporary Ethics (Routledge, 1992)
- Feminist Contentions: A Philosophical Exchange (with Judith Butler, Nancy Fraser, and Drucilla Cornell; Routledge 1994) ISBN 9780415910866
- Critique, Norm and Utopia. A Study of the Foundations of Critical Theory (Columbia University Press, 1986)

=== Articles ===
- "Modernity and the Aporias of Critical Theory". Telos 49 (Fall 1981). New York: Telos Press

=== Translator ===
- Herbert Marcuse, Hegel's Ontology and the Theory of Historicity (MIT Press 1987).

== See also ==
- Liberal theory
- Iris Marion Young
- Cosmopolitanism
- Deliberative democracy
