= Judith Harris =

Judith Harris may refer to:

- Judith Rich Harris (1938–2018), psychology researcher and author
- Judith Harris (poet), American poet and author
