= William Riley Parker Prize =

The William Riley Parker Prize is the oldest award given by the Modern Language Association, the principal professional organization in the United States and Canada for scholars of language and literature. The Parker Prize is awarded each year for an “outstanding article” published in PMLA—the association's primary journal, and widely considered the most prestigious in the study of modern languages and literatures. It was first awarded in 1964 to David J. DeLaura, then a professor at the University of Texas at Austin, for his article, “Arnold and Carlyle,” which had been published in the March 1964 issue of PMLA.

In 1968, the prize was named for former PMLA editor and MLA Secretary William Riley Parker. Parker, a professor at Indiana University, was a Milton biographer whose scholarship also considered the formation of literary studies in the United States.

== Notable winners ==
Previous winners of the prize have included Fredric Jameson, Walter Ong, and Pauline Yu. Only two scholars have won the award multiple times. Elisabeth Schneider of the University of California at Santa Barbara, received the award in 1966 and 1973. George T. Wright of the University of Minnesota received the award in 1974 and 1981.

The prize has only twice been awarded for an article published by a scholar still in graduate school. David Wayne Thomas, now an associate professor at the University of Notre Dame, was awarded the prize for an article he published while a graduate student at the University of California, Davis. Thomas's article, "Gödel's Theorem and Postmodern Theory," appeared in the March 1995 issue PMLA. More recently, Gordon Fraser was awarded the prize for "Troubling the Cold War Logic of Annihilation," an article published in the May 2015 issue of PMLA. Fraser, now a faculty member at the University of Manchester, was at the time a Ph.D. candidate in English at the University of Connecticut.

Scholars from the University of Virginia have won the award the greatest number of times, having received the prize in 2000, 1997, and 1979, and having received an honorable mention in 1969.

== List of William Riley Parker Prize Winners ==
2021

Robin Bernstein, Harvard University, for “‘You Do It!’: Going-to-Bed Books and the Scripts of Children’s Literature” (PMLA, October 2020)

William Stroebel, University of Michigan, Ann Arbor, for “Longhand Lines of Flight: Cataloging Displacement in a Karamanli Refugee’s Commonplace Book” (PMLA, March 2021)

Honorable mention: Theodore Martin, University of California, Irvine, for “War-on-Crime Fiction” (PMLA, March 2021)

2020

Sarah Wasserman, University of Delaware, Newark, for “Ralph Ellison, Chester Himes, and the Persistence of Urban Forms” (PMLA, May 2020)

Honorable mention: James Mulholland, North Carolina State University, for “Translocal Anglo-India and the Multilingual Reading Public” (PMLA, March 2020)

2019

Kamran Javadizadeh, Villanova University, for "The Atlantic Ocean Breaking on Our Heads: Claudia Rankine, Robert Lowell, and the Whiteness of the Lyric Subject" (PMLA, May 2019)

Honorable mention: Edgar Garcia, University of Chicago, for “Pictography, Law, and Earth: Gerald Vizenor, John Borrows, and Louise Erdrich” (PMLA, March 2019)

Honorable mention: Laura E. Helton, University of Delaware, Newark, for “On Decimals, Catalogs, and Racial Imaginaries of Reading” (PMLA, January 2019)

2018

Katherine Fusco, University of Nevada, Reno, for “Sexing Farina: Our Gang’s Episodes of Racial Childhood” (PMLA, May 2018)

Honorable mention: Eric Calderwood, University of Illinois, Urbana, for “Franco’s Hajj: Moroccan Pilgrims, Spanish Fascism, and the Unexpected Journeys of Modern Arabic Literature” (PMLA, October 2017)

Honorable mention: Ricardo Matthews, California State University, Fullerton, and University of California, Irvine, for “Song in Reverse: The Medieval Prosimetrum and Lyric Theory” (PMLA, March 2018)

2017

Thomas C. Connolly, Yale University, for “Primitive Passions, Blinding Visions: Arthur Rimbaud’s ‘Mystique’ and a Tradition of Mystical Ekphrasis” (PMLA, January 2017)

Honorable mention: Irene Siegel, Brooklyn, New York, for “A Judeo-Arab-Muslim Continuum: Edmond Amran El Maleh’s Poetics of Fragments” (PMLA, January 2017)

2016

Yasser Elhariry, Dartmouth College, for “Abdelwahab Meddeb, Sufi Poets, and the New Francophone Lyric” (PMLA, March 2016)

2015

Gordon Fraser, University of Connecticut, Storrs, for “Troubling the Cold War Logic of Annihilation: Apocalyptic Temporalities in Sherman Alexie’s The Lone Ranger and Tonto Fistfight in Heaven” (PMLA, May 2015)

2014

Christopher Cannon, New York University, for “From Literacy to Literature: Elementary Learning and the Middle English Poet” (PMLA, May 2014)

Honorable mention: John Levi Barnard, College of Wooster, for “Ancient History, American Time: Chesnutt’s Outsider Classicism and the Present Past” (PMLA, January 2014)

2013

Margaret Ronda, Rutgers University, New Brunswick, for “‘Work and Wait Unwearying’: Dunbar's Georgics” (PMLA, October 2012)

2012

Tobias Menely, Miami University, Oxford, for “‘The Present Obfuscation’: Cowper's Task and the Time of Climate Change” (PMLA, May 2012)

2011

Toral Jatin Gajarawala, New York University, for “Some Time between Revisionist and Revolutionary: Unreading History in Dalit Literature” (PMLA, May 2011)

=== 2010 ===
Paul Benzon, Temple University, for “Lost in Transcription: Postwar Typewriting Culture, Andy Warhol’s Bad Book, and the Standardization of Error” (PMLA, January 2010)

2009

Enrique García Santo-Tomás, University of Michigan, Ann Arbor, for “Fortunes of the Occhiali Politici in Early Modern Spain: Optics, Vision, Points of View” (PMLA, January 2009)

2008

Nergis Ertürk, Pennsylvania State University, for "Modernity and Its Fallen Languages: Tanpınar's Hasret, Benjamin's Melancholy" (PMLA, January 2008)

2007

Pauline Yu, American Council of Learned Societies, for "'Your Alabaster in This Porcelain': Judith Gautier's Le livre de jade" (March 2007)

Honorable mention: Joseph R. Slaughter, Columbia University, for "Enabling Fictions and Novel Subjects: The Bildungsroman and International Human Rights Law" (October 2006)

2006

Lorraine Piroux, Rutgers University, for "The Encyclopedist and the Peruvian Princess: The Poetics of Illegibility in French Enlightenment Book Culture" (January 2006)

2005

Bill Brown, University of Chicago, for "The Dark Wood of Postmodernity (Space, Faith, Allegory)" (May 2005)

Honorable mention: Feisal G. Mohamed, Texas Tech University, for "Confronting Religious Violence: Milton's Samson Agonistes" (March 2005)

2004

Rolf J. Goebel, University of Alabama, Huntsville, for "Berlin's Architectural Citations: Reconstruction, Simulation, and the Problems of Historical Authenticity" (October 2003)

2003

Anne Mallory, University of Georgia, for "Burke, Boredom, and the Theater of Counterrevolution" (March 2003)

Honorable mention: Paul Giles, University of Oxford, for "Transnationalism and Classic American Literature" (January 2003)

2002

Geoffrey Sanborn, Bard College, for "Keeping Her Distance: Cisneros, Dickinson, and the Politics of Private Enjoyment" (October 2001)

2001

Ian Baucom, Duke University, for "Globalit, Inc.; or, The Cultural Logic of Global Literary Studies" (January 2001)

=== 2000 ===
Rita Felski, University of Virginia, for "Nothing to Declare: Identity, Shame, and the Lower Middle Class" (January 2000)

1999

Phillip Novak, Le Moyne College, for "'Circles and Circles of Sorrow': In the Wake of Morrison's Sula" (March 1999)

1998

Henry Staten, University of Washington, for "Ethnic Authenticity, Class, and Autobiography: The Case of Hunger of Memory" (January 1998)

1997

Jahan Ramazani, University of Virginia, for "The Wound of History: Walcott's Omeros and the Postcolonial Poetics of Affliction" (May 1997)

1996

Lawrence Lipking, Northwestern University, for "The Genius of the Shore: Lycidas, Adamastor, and the Poetics of Nationalism" (March 1996)

Honorable mention: Ann Louise Kibbie, Bowdoin College, for "Monstrous Generation: The Birth of Capital in Defoe's Moll Flanders and Roxana" (October 1995)

1995

David Wayne Thomas, University of California, Davis, for "Gödel's Theorem and Postmodern Theory" (March 1995)

1994

Claire Cavanagh, University of Wisconsin, Madison, for "Rereading the Poet's Ending: Mandelstam, Chaplin, and Stalin" (January 1994)

1993

Alan Nadel, Rensselaer Polytechnic Institute, for "God's Law and the Wide Screen: The Ten Commandments as Cold War 'Epic'" (May 1993)

1992

Edward Hirsch, University of Houston, for "The Imaginary Irish Peasant" (October 1991)

1991

Beth S. Newman, Southern Methodist University, for "'The Situation of the Looker-On': Gender, Narration, and Gaze in Wuthering Heights" (October 1990), and David K. Herzberger, University of Connecticut, for "Narrating the Past: History and the Novel of Memory in Postwar Spain" (January 1991)

=== 1990 ===
William L. Andrews, University of Kansas, for "The Novelization of Voice in Early African American Narrative" (January 1990)

1989

Margaret Waller, Pomona College, for "Cherchez la Femme: Male Malady and Narrative Politics in the French Romantic Novel" (March 1989)

1988

Thomas C. Caramagno, University of Hawaii, Honolulu, for "Manic-Depressive Psychosis and Critical Approaches to Virginia Woolf's Life and Work" (January 1988)

1987

Donald W. Foster, Vassar College, for "Master W. H., R.I.P." (January 1987)

1986

Thomas Hyde, Yale University, for "Boccaccio: The Genealogies of Myth" (October 1985)

1985

Terry Castle, Stanford University, for "The Carnivalization of Eighteenth-Century English Narrative" (October 1984)

1984

A. Kent Hieatt, University of Western Ontario, for "The Genesis of Shakespeare's Sonnets: Spenser's Ruines of Rome: by Bellay" (October 1983)

Honorable mention: Marshall Brown, University of Colorado, for "'Errours Endlesse Traine': On Turning Points and the Dialectical Imagination" (January 1984)

1983

Paul B. Armstrong, Georgia Institute of Technology, for "The Conflict of Interpretations and the Limits of Pluralism" (May 1983)

1982

Hans Eichner, University of Toronto, for "The Rise of Modern Science and the Genesis of Romanticism" (January 1982)

1981

George T. Wright, University of Minnesota, Minneapolis, for "Hendiadys and Hamlet" (March 1981)

Honorable mention: Gerhard Joseph, Lehman College, City University of New York, for "The Antigone as Cultural Touchstone: Matthew Arnold, Hegel, George Eliot, Virginia Woolf, and Margaret Drabble" (January 1981)

Honorable mention: Marshall Brown, University of Colorado, for "The Logic of Realism: A Hegelian Approach" (March 1981)

=== 1980 ===
Roger W. Herzel, State University of New York, Albany, for "'Much Depends on the Acting': The Original Cast of Le Misanthrope" (May 1980)

1979

David H. Miles, University of Virginia, for "Portrait of the Marxist as a Young Hegelian: Lukács' Theory of the Novel" (January 1979)

1978

Morris E. Eaves, University of New Mexico, for "Blake and the Artistic Machine: An Essay in Decorum and Technology" (October 1977)

1977

Evelyn J. Hinz, University of Manitoba, for "Hierogamy versus Wedlock: Types of Marriage Plots and Their Relationship to Genres of Prose Fiction" (October 1976)

1976

R. G. Peterson, Saint Olaf College, for "Critical Calculations: Measure and Symmetry in Literature" (May 1976)

1975

Walter J. Ong, SJ, Saint Louis University, for "The Writer's Audience Is Always a Fiction" (January 1975)

Honorable mention: A. Dwight Culler, Yale University, for "Monodrama and the Dramatic Monologue" (May 1975)

1974

George T. Wright, University of Minnesota, Minneapolis, for "The Lyric Present: Simple Present Verbs in English Poems" (May 1974)

1973

Elisabeth Schneider, University of California, Santa Barbara, for "Prufrock and After: The Theme of Change" (October 1972)

Honorable mention: Frances W. Weber, University of Michigan, for "Unamuno's Niebla: From Novel to Dream" (March 1973)

1972

R. A. Yoder, Northeastern University, for "Toward the 'Titmouse Dimension': The Development of Emerson's Poetic Style" (March 1972)

1971

Fredric R. Jameson, University of California, San Diego, for "Metacommentary" (January 1971) and "La Cousine Bette and Allegorical Realism" (March 1971)

Honorable mention: Alan E. Knight, Pennsylvania State University, for "The Medieval Theater of the Absurd" (March 1971)

Honorable mention: Robert Champigny, Indiana University, for "Implicitness in Narrative Fiction" (October 1970)

=== 1970 ===
E. D. Lowry, Dunbarton College of Holy Cross, for "The Lively Art of Manhattan Transfer" (October 1969)

Honorable mention: W. B. Carnochan, Stanford University, for "Satire, Sublimity, and Sentiment: Theory and Practice in Post-Augustan Satire" (March 1970)

Honorable mention: William V. Spanos, State University of New York, Binghamton, for "'Wanna Go Home, Baby?': Sweeney Agonistes as Drama of the Absurd" (January 1970)

1969

Rudolf B. Gottfried, Indiana University, Bloomington, for "Our New Poet: Archetypal Criticism and The Faerie Queene" (October 1968)

Honorable mention: Leon Gottfried, Washington University, for "Death's Other Kingdom: Dantesque and Theological Symbolism in 'Flowering Judas'" (January 1969)

Honorable mention: Jules Brody, City University of New York, for "Don Juan and Le Misanthrope, or the Esthetics of Individualism in Molière" (May 1969)

Honorable mention: L. A. Beaurline, University of Virginia, for "Ben Jonson and the Illusion of Completeness" (January 1969)

Honorable mention: Nina Baym, University of Illinois, for "Fleda Vetch and the Plot of The Spoils of Poynton" (January 1969)

1968

Stanley B. Greenfield, University of Oregon, for "Grammar and Meaning in Poetry" (October 1967)

Honorable mention: Joseph J. Moldenhauer, University of Texas, for "Murder as a Fine Art: Basic Connections between Poe's Aesthetics, Psychology, and Moral Vision" (May 1968)

Honorable mention: Glauco Cambon, Rutgers University, for "Eugenio Montale's 'Motets': The Occasions of Epiphany" (December 1967)

1967

Donald Rackin, Temple University, for "Alice's Journey to the End of Night" (October 1966)

1966

Elisabeth Schneider, University of California, Santa Barbara, for "The Wreck of the Deutschland: A New Reading" (March 1966)

1965

René Girard, Johns Hopkins University, for "Camus's Stranger Retried" (December 1964)

=== 1964 ===
David J. DeLaura, University of Texas, Austin, for "Arnold and Carlyle" (March 1964)

Honorable mention: William M. Manly, Simmons College, for "Journey to Consciousness: The Symbolic Pattern of Camus's L'étranger" (June 1964)

Honorable mention: Isidore Silver, Washington University, for "Ronsard's Reflections on Cosmogony and Nature" (June 1964)
