= List of general awards in the humanities =

This list of general awards in the humanities is an index to articles about notable awards for general contributions to the humanities, a collection of academic disciplines that study aspects of human society and culture. These awards typically have broad scope, and may apply to many or all areas within the humanities. The list is organized by region and country of the sponsoring organization, but awards are not necessarily limited to people from that country.

== Americas ==
| Country | Award | Sponsor | Description |
|---|---|---|---|
| Canada | Molson Prize | Canada Council | One prize is awarded in the arts, one in the social sciences and humanities |
| Chile | National Prize for Humanities and Social Sciences | President of Chile | To the humanist, scientist, or academic, who has distinguished himself for his contribution in the field of Human Sciences |
| United States | Jefferson Lecture | National Endowment for the Humanities | For distinguished intellectual achievement in humanities |
| United States | Kluge Prize | John W. Kluge Center at the Library of Congress | For lifetime achievement in the humanities and social sciences to celebrate the importance of the Intellectual Arts for the public interest |
| United States | National Humanities Medal | National Endowment for the Humanities | For individuals, groups, or institutions for work that has deepened the nation's understanding of the humanities, broadened our citizens' engagement with the humanities, or helped preserve and expand Americans' access to important resources in the humanities |
| United States | Ralph Waldo Emerson Award | Phi Beta Kappa | For books that have made the most significant contributions to the humanities. |
| United States | Richard W. Lyman Award | National Humanities Center | Scholars who have advanced the humanities through the use of information technology |

== Asia ==
| Country | Award | Sponsor | Notes |
|---|---|---|---|
| India | Infosys Prize in Humanities | Infosys Science Foundation | Awards outstanding achievements of contemporary researchers and scientists across six categories, including Humanities |
| Iran | Farabi International Award | Ministry of Science, Research and Technology | To individuals who have made outstanding contributions to humanities |
| Japan | Imperial Prize of the Japan Academy | Emperor of Japan | For humanities and natural sciences, conferred to two of the recipients of the Japan Academy Prize (academics). |

== Europe ==
| Country | Award | Sponsor | Notes |
|---|---|---|---|
| Austria | Preis der Stadt Wien für Geisteswissenschaften | City of Vienna | For outstanding contributions in the humanities |
| Germany | Aby Warburg Prize | City of Hamburg | For excellence in the humanities and social sciences |
| Germany | Herder Prize | Alfred Toepfer Stiftung F.V.S. | International prize awarded every year to scholars and artists from Central and Southeast Europe whose life and work have contributed to the cultural understanding of European countries and their peaceful interrelations |
| Germany | Meister Eckhart Prize | Identity Foundation | To thinkers who produce high-quality work on the subject of identity |
| United Kingdom | Awards of the British Academy | British Academy | Various awards |
| United Kingdom | British Academy Medal | British Academy | For outstanding achievement that has transformed understanding of a particular subject or field of study in ... any branch of the humanities and social sciences |
| United Kingdom | Medlicott Medal | Historical Association | To individuals for outstanding services and current contributions to history |
| United Kingdom | President's Medal (British Academy) | British Academy | For outstanding service to the cause of the humanities and social sciences |

== See also ==
- Lists of awards
- Lists of humanities awards
