= Kluge Prize =

Award for lifetime achievement in the humanities and social sciences

The John W. Kluge Prize for the Study of Humanity is awarded since 2003 for lifetime achievement in the humanities and social sciences to celebrate the importance of the Intellectual Arts for the public interest.

== Overview ==
The prize is awarded by the John W. Kluge Center at the Library of Congress. The Prize is conferred in a ceremony in the Great Hall of the Jefferson Building, attended by American political leaders to dramatize America's commitment to these areas of human inquiry. The Prize winner will give an address, will remain in residence at the Library of Congress for a short time thereafter, and will be expected to have some informal interaction with Members of the United States Congress.

Members of the Scholars' Council, as described in the appended Charter of the John W. Kluge Center, and holders of the Kluge Chairs will be among those offering recommendations to the Librarian of Congress concerning recipients of the Kluge Prize.

Endowed by Library benefactor John W. Kluge, the Kluge Prize rewards lifetime achievement in the wide range of disciplines not covered by the Nobel Prizes. Such disciplines include history, philosophy, politics, anthropology, sociology, religion, criticism in the arts and humanities, and linguistics. The award is at the financial level of the Nobel awards.

The prize is international; the recipient may be of any nationality, writing in any language. The main criterion for a recipient of the Kluge Prize is deep intellectual accomplishment in the human sciences. The recipient's body of work should evidence growth in maturity and range over the years. The recipient will have demonstrated unusual distinction within a given area of inquiry and across disciplines in the human sciences. Significantly, the recipient's writings should be, in large part, understandable and important for those involved in public affairs.

== Candidates ==
In order to ensure consideration of as wide a pool of candidates as possible, in 2001, the Librarian of Congress solicited nominations for the Kluge Prize from a broad range of individuals knowledgeable about the humanities and social sciences in colleges, universities, and research institutions across the globe, as well as from independent scholars and writers.

In 2002, the Librarian of the Library of Congress called upon a Scholars' Council of 20 preeminent scholars from around the world to consider the range of nominations. The council had been established to offer suggestions and advice on the choice of scholars to study at the John W. Kluge Center at the Library.

Based upon extensive research and further recommendations, the director of the Office of Scholarly Programs prepared a list of candidates for the Librarian's consideration in 2003. In addition to soliciting numerous outside reviews for each of these scholars, the Librarian called upon an expert staff of curators in the Library to conduct extensive biographical and bibliographical research as well as to gather published reviews and discussions of each candidate's work, prepare abstracts of translations of key articles from material available only in foreign languages, and provide a brief characterization and evaluation of the scholarly corpus of the candidate.

Finally, detailed dossiers on each candidate were sent to the members of the Final Kluge Prize Review Panel. Deliberating at the Library, this panel submitted its recommendations to the Librarian, who then made the final decision.

== Past winners ==
Past winners
Year	Winner	Country	Ref.
2003	Leszek Kołakowski	Poland	
2004	Jaroslav Pelikan	USA	
2004	Paul Ricœur	France	
2006	John Hope Franklin	USA	
2006	Yu Ying-shih	USA	
2008	Romila Thapar	India	
2008	Peter Brown	Ireland	
2012	Fernando Henrique Cardoso	Brazil	
2015	Jürgen Habermas	Germany	
2015	Charles Taylor	Canada	
2018	Drew Gilpin Faust	USA	
2020	Danielle Allen	USA	
2022	George Chauncey	USA	
2024	Kwame Anthony Appiah	USA	
2026	Martha Nussbaum	USA	

== See also ==
- List of general awards in the humanities
- List of philosophy awards
- List of social sciences awards
- List of prizes known as the Nobel of a field
- List of awards named after people
