= Pauline Yu =

American sinologist

- 余寶琳
- Born: Rochester, New York
- Citizenship: American
- Education: Harvard University (BA), Stanford University (MA, PhD)
- Occupation: Sinologist

Pauline Yu (traditional Chinese: 余寶琳; simplified Chinese: 余宝琳; pinyin: Yú Bǎolín; born 1949) is an American scholar of Chinese literature and culture noted for her contributions to the study of classical Chinese poetry and comparative literature. She is also known for her research and advocacy on issues in the humanities. Yu serves on the Henry Luce Foundation's board of directors.

== Early life and education ==
Yu was born in 1949 in Rochester, New York, to two recent immigrants from China, Paul N. Yu, a cardiologist who was later elected president of the American Heart Association; and I Ling Tang, a pediatrician. Her account of her father's funeral in Taiwan was published in The American Scholar in 2013.

Yu attended public schools in the Rochester suburb of Brighton and was inducted into the first class of the Brighton High School Hall of Fame in 2006.

Yu received her B.A. in modern French and German history and literature from Radcliffe College. While in college she studied for a year at the Free University of Berlin. She received her M.A. and Ph.D. in comparative literature from Stanford University.

== Career ==
Yu taught at the University of Minnesota from 1976 to 1985, at Columbia University from 1985 to 1989, and was founding chair of the Department of East Asian Languages and Literature at the University of California, Irvine from 1989 to 1994. Yu was dean of humanities in the College of Letters and Science at the University of California, Los Angeles and professor of East Asian languages and cultures from 1994 to 2003. She is the recipient of fellowships from the Guggenheim Foundation (1983) and the American Council of Learned Societies (1983). Her article "'Your Alabaster in This Porcelain': Judith Gautier’s Le livre de jade" received the William Riley Parker Prize for best PMLA article of 2007.

A fellow of the American Academy of Arts and Sciences, Yu is on the academy's national Commission on the Humanities & Social Sciences. She is an elected member of the American Philosophical Society and Committee of 100, the Board of Directors of both the Teagle Foundation and the Chiang Ching-Kuo Foundation for International Scholarly Exchange, and the Kluge Scholars' Council of the Library of Congress. Yu was a member of the Board of Trustees of the National Humanities Center from 2000 to 2019.

From 2003 to 2019, Yu served as president of the American Council of Learned Societies (ACLS), an organization created to represent and support scholars and scholarship in the humanities.

She was awarded a National Humanities Medal in 2022.

== Personal life ==
Yu was married to Theodore D. Huters from 1975 to 2000. They have three children and three grandchildren.

== Select publications ==
- Ways with Words: Writing about Reading Texts from Early China, co-ed. Berkeley and L.A.: University of California Press, 2000
- Culture and State in Chinese History: Conventions, Accommodations, and Critiques, co-ed. Stanford: Stanford University Press, 1997
- Voices of the Song Lyric in China, sole ed. and contributor. Berkeley: University of California Press, 1994.
- The Reading of Imagery in the Chinese Poetic Tradition. Princeton: Princeton University Press, 1987.
- The Poetry of Wang Wei: New Translations and Commentary. Bloomington: Indiana University Press, 1980.
