= Jim Sleeper =

American author and journalist

- Education: Yale College; Harvard University
- Occupations: Author, journalist
- Writing career
- Subjects: American political culture, racial politics, news, media and higher education
- Notable works: The Closest of Strangers: Liberalism and the Politics of Race in New York; Liberal Racism; In Search of New York

Jim Sleeper is an American author and journalist. He was a lecturer in political science at Yale University from 1999 to 2020, teaching undergraduate seminars on American national identity and on journalism, liberalism, and democracy.

He writes primarily on American political culture, racial politics, news, media and higher education. In the 1990s, he wrote two books about racial politics, The Closest of Strangers: Liberalism and the Politics of Race in New York and Liberal Racism. From 1993 to 1995, he was a political columnist for the New York Daily News and an occasional contributor to The New York Times, The Nation, The New Republic, Commonweal, Washington Monthly and other political magazines. From 1988 to 1993, he was an opinion editor and editorial writer for New York Newsday. He was also an occasional commentator on the PBS News Hour and National Public Radio’s All Things Considered.

Sleeper's recent work has appeared in Salon, Foreign Policy, Democracy, The New Republic, Dissent, and Asia Sentinel. His recent writings include critiques of neoconservative and grand strategy policies in the United States and abroad, the corporatization of American higher education, and joint ventures between American universities and universities in authoritarian societies. He also writes extensively about Trumpism and other crises of the American republic, including controversies over freedom of speech. Sleeper has previously written on the Obama administration, Occupy Wall Street, Yale University's venture to establish an undergraduate college in collaboration with Singapore, and gun control in the United States.

From 1983 to 2021, Sleeper was a member of the editorial board and a frequent contributor to the quarterly Dissent, for which he edited In Search of New York, an edition of the magazine in 1987 that was republished by Transaction Books in 1988.

== Biography ==
Sleeper was born in Longmeadow, Massachusetts and graduated from Yale College in 1969. He was awarded a doctorate in education from the Harvard Graduate School of Education in 1977. In the 1970s and 1980s, he taught urban studies and writing at Harvard University, Queens College, and New York University before becoming a New York City journalist and a lecturer at Yale University. In 1982–83, he was a Charles Revson Fellow at Columbia University, studying urban housing development, and in 1998 a fellow at Harvard University's Shorenstein Center on Media, Politics and Public Policy.

Sleeper is married to the political scientist and philosopher Seyla Benhabib.

== Bibliography ==
- Liberal Racism (Rowman & Littlefield, 2002) (First edition published by Viking Press/Penguin Books, 1997 and 1998).
- The Closest of Strangers: Liberalism and the Politics of Race in New York (W. W. Norton & Co.), 1990; paperback (Norton), 1991.
- In Search of New York (Transaction Books), 1988. Editor. An anthology of reportage, essays, reminiscences, and photography that was a special issue of Dissent magazine in 1987. Contributors include Irving Howe, Ada Louise Huxtable, Michael Harrington, Jim Chapin, Paul Berman, and many others.
- The New Jews (Vintage Books paperback), 1971. Co-editor; essays by young religious radicals of the time.

Chapters in anthologies

- Normative Tensions: Academic Freedom in International Education, Kevin W. Gray, ed. (Rowman & Littlefield, 2022), Essay: “Innocents Abroad? Liberal Educators in Illiberal Societies.”
- Orwell Into the Twenty-First Century Thomas Cushman and John Rodden, eds. (Paradigm Press, 2005). Chapter: “Orwell’s Smelly Little Orthodoxies – and Ours”
- A Way Out Owen Fiss, Joshua Cohen eds. (Princeton University Press, 2003); Essay, “Against Social Engineering,” a response to an “urban removal” manifesto by Yale Law Professor Owen Fiss.
- One America? Stanley Renshon, ed. (Georgetown University Press, 2001). Essay:“American National Identity in a Post-national Age.”
- Empire City: New York Through the Centuries Kenneth Jackson and David Dunbar, eds. (Columbia University Press, October 2002). Chapter: “Boodling, Bigotry, and Cosmopolitanism,” about New York City in the late 1980s.
- Post-Mortem: The O.J. Verdict Jeffrey Abramson, editor (Basic Books, 1996). Essay, “Racial Theater,” about the public staging of the O.J. trial.
- The New Republic Guide to the Candidates, 1996 Andrew Sullivan, editor (Basic Books, 1996). Essay on Bill Bradley, the non-candidate, and his concerns about civil society.
- Blacks and Jews: Alliances and Arguments Paul Berman, editor (Delacorte Press, 1995). Chapter: “The Battle for Enlightenment at City College,” on CUNY Prof. Leonard Jeffries and identity politics.
- Debating Affirmative Action Nicolaus Mills, editor. (Dell Publishing, 1994). Essay,“Affirmative Action’s Outer Limits.”
- Tikkun Anthology Michael Lerner, editor, 1992. Essay, “Demagoguery in America: Wrong Turns in the Politics of Race.” (One of the early, classic critiques of identity politics in the American left.)
