= Robert Moynihan =

American editor

Robert Moynihan is the founding editor of Inside the Vatican magazine, a magazine on Church and world affairs.

== Education ==
He received his Ph.D. in medieval history from the Yale University in 1988 under Prof. Jaroslav Pelikan. His thesis was titled The Influence of Joachim of Fiore on the Early Franciscans: A Study of the Commentary Super Hieremiam.

== Personal ==
He currently lives in Annapolis, Maryland. Moynihan is fluent in five different languages.

== Career ==
Moynihan is founder and editor-in-chief of the Inside the Vatican. He has spoken on Catholic issues in a number of media outlets which include: Fox News, CNN, ABC, EWTN and many others.

== Books ==
- The Spiritual Vision of Pope Benedict XVI: Let God’s Light Shine Forth
- Pray for Me: The Life and Spiritual vision of Pope Francis
- Finding Viganò: : In Search of the Man Whose Testimony Shook the Church and the World
- The first Pope from the Americas
- Guarding the Flame: The Challenges Facing the Church in the Twenty-First Century
