= Megatrajectory =

In evolutionary biology, megatrajectories are the major evolutionary milestones and directions in the evolution of life.

Posited by A. H. Knoll and Richard K. Bambach in their 2000 collaboration, "Directionality in the History of Life," Knoll and Bamback argue that, in consideration of the problem of progress in evolutionary history, a middle road that encompasses both contingent and convergent features of biological evolution may be attainable through the idea of the megatrajectory:

We believe that six broad megatrajectories capture the essence of vectoral change in the history of life. The megatrajectories for a logical sequence dictated by the necessity for complexity level N to exist before N+1 can evolve...In the view offered here, each megatrajectory adds new and qualitatively distinct dimensions to the way life utilizes ecospace.

According to Knoll and Bambach, the six megatrajectories outlined by biological evolution thus far are:

1. the origin of life to the "Last Common Ancestor"
2. prokaryote diversification
3. unicellular eukaryote diversification
4. multicellular organisms
5. land organisms
6. appearance of intelligence and technology

Milan M. Ćirković and Robert Bradbury, have taken the megatrajectory concept one step further by theorizing that a seventh megatrajectory exists: postbiological evolution triggered by the emergence of artificial intelligence at least equivalent to the biologically-evolved one, as well as the invention of several key technologies of the similar level of complexity and environmental impact, such as molecular nanoassembling or stellar uplifting.

== See also ==
- Intelligence principle
