= John W. Kluge Center =

Academic institute at the U.S. Library of Congress

The John W. Kluge Center
- Founders: John Kluge, James H. Billington
- Established: 2000
- Mission: The Kluge Center’s mission, as established in 2000, is to reinvigorate the interconnection between thought and action, bridging the gap between scholarship and policymaking. To that end, the Center brings some of the world’s great thinkers to the Library to make use of the Library collections and engage in conversations addressing the challenges facing democracies in the 21st century.
- Focus: Public policy, humanities, social sciences, foreign policy, law, astrobiology
- Faculty: 125-150 resident scholars per year
- Staff: 8
- Key people: Kevin Butterfield (Director, 2022-present)
- Endowment: $60 million
- Location: 101 Independence Avenue SE, Washington, D.C., United States
- Website: www.loc.gov/programs/john-w-kluge-center/about-this-program/

The John W. Kluge Center at the Library of Congress invites and welcomes scholars to the Library of Congress to conduct research and interact with policymakers and the public. It also manages the Kluge Scholars' Council and administers the Kluge Prize at the Library of Congress.

Established in 2000 within the restored Thomas Jefferson Building, the Center is named for its benefactor, John W. Kluge who donated $60 million to support an academic center where accomplished senior scholars and junior post-doctoral fellows might gather to make use of the Library's collections and to interact with members of Congress.

In addition, his gift established a $1 million Kluge Prize to be given in recognition of a lifetime of achievement in the human sciences.

The Kluge Center invites three levels of scholars: senior scholars, post-doctoral fellows, and doctoral candidates. Past scholars have included Václav Havel, Jaroslav Pelikan, John Hope Franklin, Robert V. Remini, Romila Thapar, Fernando Henrique Cardoso, Abdolkarim Soroush, David Grinspoon, Steven J. Dick, and Cardinal Theodore Edgar McCarrick among many.

The Kluge Center hosts frequent public lectures, conferences, symposia and other scholarly events based on the work of its scholars.

== History ==
The Kluge Center was founded in 2000 with a gift to the Library of Congress by philanthropist John W. Kluge. The gift was announced on October 5, 2000, in a joint press conference by Sen. Ted Stevens (R-Alaska), then Chairman of the Joint Committee on the Library, Rep. Bill Thomas (R-California), then Vice-Chairman of the Joint Committee on the Library, and James H. Billington, then the Librarian of Congress. The Center opened in summer 2002, welcoming its first scholars in July and August.

In June 2015, the Kluge Center celebrated its 15th anniversary with an event titled #ScholarFest. The event brought back to Washington some of the Center's best scholars for two days of "lightning conversations" on Capitol Hill. The Washington Post described the event as "speed dating for the intelligentsia."

== Charter ==
The Kluge Center charter states that the Kluge Center will "bring a small number of the world's best thinkers into residence at the Library of Congress. The Center will assemble the finest minds characterized by broad historical or philosophical vision and capable of providing dispassionate wisdom and intelligent mediation of the knowledge in the Library's collections and of the information streaming into the Library via the Internet. They will have the opportunity through residence in the Jefferson Building both to distill wisdom from the rich resources of the Library and to stimulate, through informal conversations and meetings, Members of Congress, their support staffs and the broader public policy community. The Center's Scholars and Fellows will help bridge the divide between knowledge and power."

The charter establishes five positions for people of great scholarly accomplishment, Kluge Chairs, in the areas of American Law and Governance, Countries and Cultures of the North, Countries and Cultures of the South, Technology and Society and Modern Culture. The charter also stipulates that the Kluge Center will be home to a Henry A. Kissinger Chair in Foreign Policy and International Relations, Harissios Papamarkou Chair in Education, and Cary and Ann Maguire Chair in American History and Ethics. The charter adds that invitations to additional distinguished visiting scholars may be made to pursue special projects.

The charter commits the Center to accommodating younger scholars as Fellows, particularly scholars at the post-doctoral level. The selection of the Fellows is by competition.

The charter also states that the Kluge Center will be responsible for awarding the Kluge Prize.

== Notable scholars ==
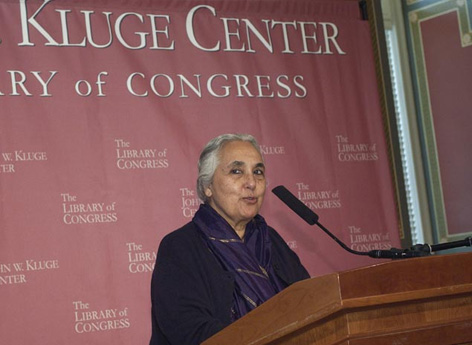
Historian Romila Thapar at the Kluge Center inaugural

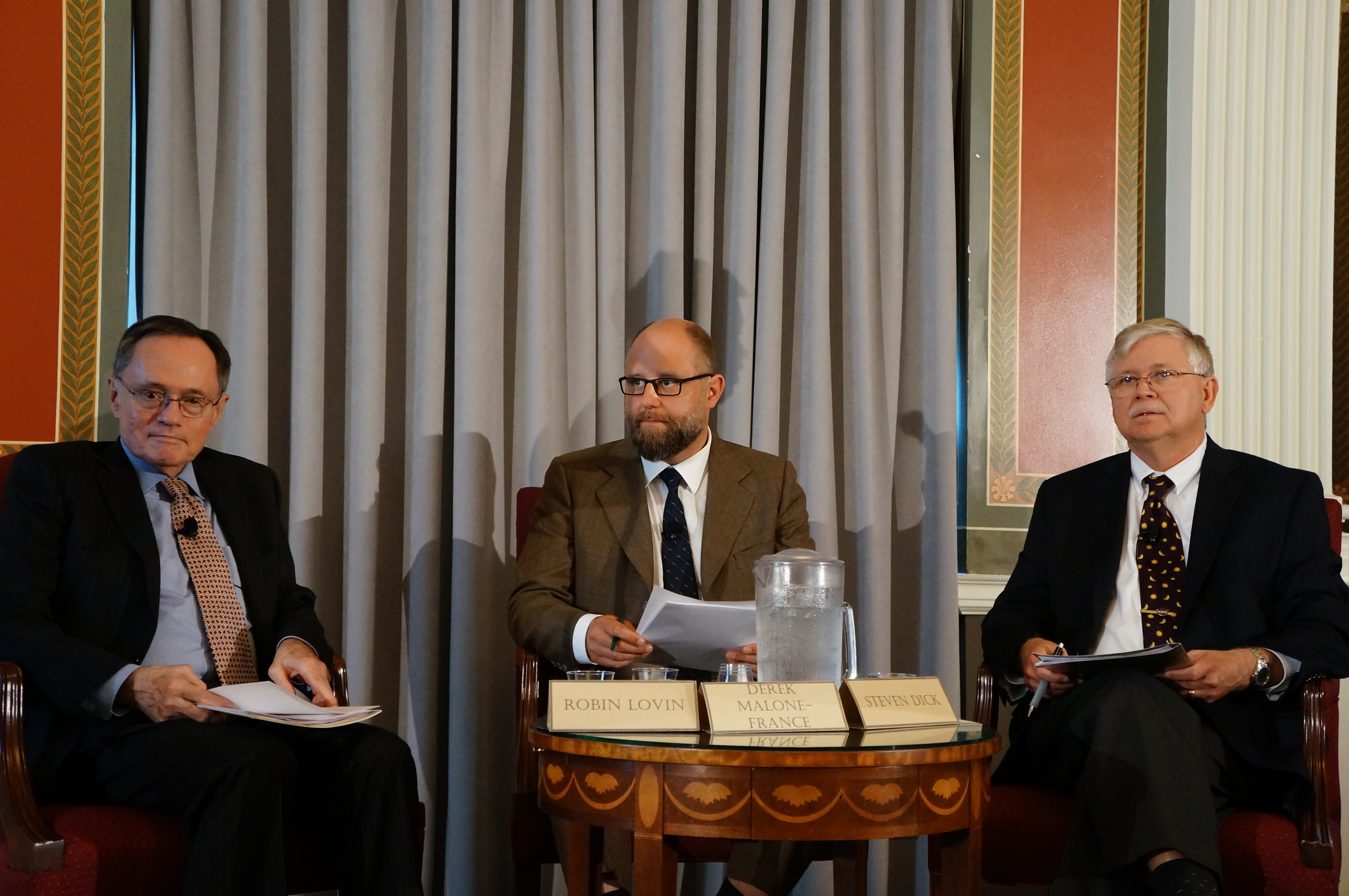
In June 2014, the John W. Kluge Center of the Library of Congress held a seminar focusing on astrobiology. Panel members (l to r) theologian Robin Lovin, philosopher Derek Malone-France, and astrobiologist Steven J. Dick

The Kluge Center has hosted several notable scholars from the academic and political worlds, including:

- Rolena Adorno, Historian, Kluge Chair in Countries and Culture of the South
- Jeffrey C. Alexander, Sociologist, Distinguished Visiting Scholar
- Marie Arana, Author, Distinguished Visiting Scholar
- Sarah Barringer Gordon, Legal Scholar, Maguire Chair in Ethics, and American History
- Jean Bethke Elshtain, Ethicist, Maguire Chair in Ethics and American History
- Fernando Henrique Cardoso, Politician & sociologist, Distinguished Visiting Scholar
- Manuel Castells, Sociologist, Chair in Technology and Society
- Steven J. Dick, Astronomer, NASA/Library of Congress Chair in Astrobiology
- John Hope Franklin, Historian, Distinguished Visiting Scholar
- Aaron Friedberg, Foreign Policy analyst, Kissinger Chair in Foreign Policy and International Relations
- Václav Havel, Politician & playwright, Chair in Modern Culture
- Patricia O'Toole Historian, Distinguished Visiting Scholar
- Wendy Hall, Computer scientist, Chair in Technology and Society
- Stephen Houston, Historian, Jay I. Kislak Chair in the Study of the History and Culture of the Early Americas
- David Grinspoon, Planetary Scientist, NASA/Library of Congress Chair in Astrobiology
- Maya Jasanoff, Historian, Kluge Fellow
- Cathleen Kaveny, Legal ethics scholar, Cary and Ann Maquire Chair in Ethics and American History
- Morton Kondracke, Journalist, Kemp Chair in Political Economy
- Ivan Krastev, Political Scientist, Kissinger Chair in Foreign Policy and International Relations
- Mary E. Lovely, Economist, Library of Congress Chair in U.S.-China Relations
- Cardinal Theodore Edgar McCarrick, Theologian, Distinguished Visiting Scholar
- Raja Mohan, Foreign Policy analyst, Kissinger Chair in Foreign Policy and International Relations
- Major Owens, U.S. Congressman, Distinguished Visiting Scholar
- Mark Noll, Historian, Maguire Chair in Ethics and American History
- Minxin Pei, Political Scientists, Library of Congress Chair in U.S.-China Relations
- Kenneth Pomeranz, Historian, Kluge Chair in Countries and Cultures of the North
- Robert V. Remini, Historian, Distinguished Visiting Scholar
- Wm. Roger Louis, Historian, Chair in Countries & Cultures of the North
- Susan Schneider. Philosopher, NASA/Library of Congress Cahir in Astrobiology, Exploration, and Scientific Innovation
- Neil Smelser, Sociologist, Chair in Countries and Cultures of the North
- Abdolkarim Soroush, Philosopher, Distinguished Visiting Scholar
- Romila Thapar, Historian, Chair in Countries & Cultures of the North
- William Julius Wilson, Sociologist, Chair in American Law and Governance

== Partnerships ==
The Kluge Center participates in several partnerships that bring scholars to the Library of Congress for periods of residential research. These include partnerships with:

- NASA - on the Baruch S. Blumberg NASA/Library of Congress Chair in Astrobiology
- Arts and Humanities Research Council - to bring scholars based in the United Kingdom to the Library of Congress for up to six months
- American Council of Learned Societies - for Recently Tenured Scholars to conduct research at the Library of Congress
- American Historical Association - on the J. Franklin Jameson Fellowship in American History
- Bavarian American Academy - for students and graduates at Bavarian universities
- Black Mountain Institute at University of Nevada, Las Vegas
