= Golden Eurydice Award =

Biology and philosophy award

The Golden Eurydice Award is presented for an outstanding contribution, or contributions over a period, in the field of biophilosophy. It is awarded by the International Forum for Biophilosophy which was established in Belgium by royal decree in 1988. Founding members included Herman Van Den Berghe.

== The award ==
The award consists of a sculptured golden statue of Eurydice. Awardees must make a 20-minute presentation of their work at a special Golden Keynote evening event, which usually takes place in November/December each year. Awardees are also granted Honorary membership of the forum.

== Award recipients ==
Recipients include:

- 2013: Don Ihde, Albert Borgmann
- 2009: Emile Aarts, Kevin Warwick
- 2007: Craig Venter, Ananda Chakrabarty
- 2006: Eric Juengst
- 2005: Jean-Pierre Changeux

== See also ==
- List of biology awards
- List of philosophy awards
