= Feisal G. Mohamed =

Egyptian-Canadian critic and essayist

Feisal G. Mohamed is a scholar, critic, and essayist whose writing has appeared in The New York Times series "The Stone," in Dissent Magazine, the Chronicle Review, the Yale Review, The American Scholar, Huffington Post, Boston Review, and on the website of The New Republic. He is currently a professor of English at Yale University. Among his awards and recognitions are a New Directions Fellowship from the Mellon Foundation, an Honorable Mention for the Modern Language Association's William Riley Parker Prize, and a James Holly Hanford Award for an outstanding book on poet John Milton. He holds a BSc in biology (1997) and MA in English (1999) from the University of Ottawa, a PhD in English (2003) from the University of Toronto, and an LLM (2012) from the University of Illinois College of Law.

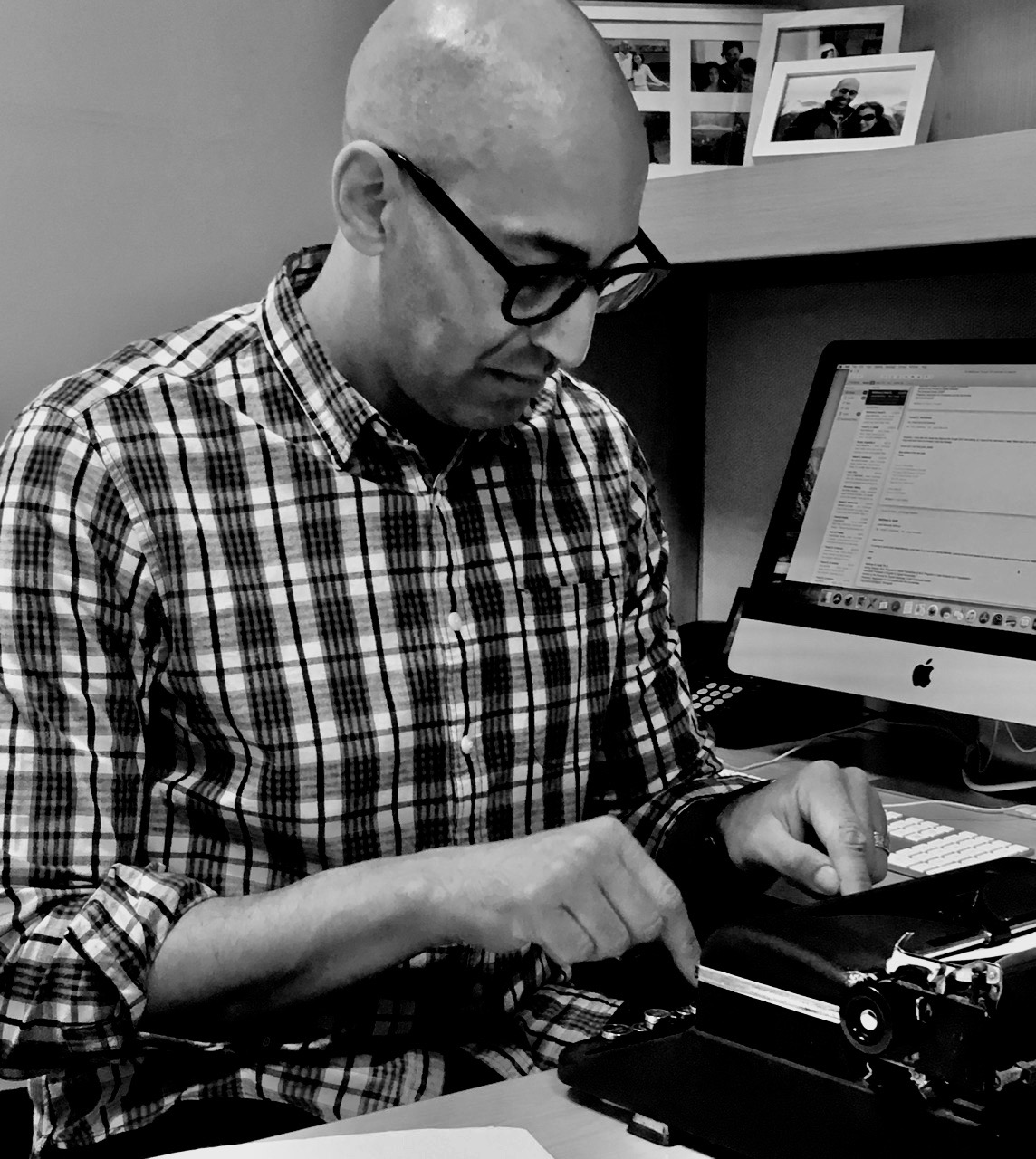
Feisal G. Mohamed in December 2018

Mohamed's academic writing focuses on early modern English literature, as in his books Sovereignty (2020); Milton and the Post-secular Present (2011); In the Anteroom of Divinity (2008); Milton and Questions of History (2012), co-edited with Mary Nyquist; and Milton's Modernities (2017), co-edited with Patrick Fadely. He is a past president of the Milton Society of America and editorial board member of the journals Milton Studies, ELH, Literature and Theology, and Workplace: A Journal for Academic Labor. Responding to widespread defunding of public higher education and of the humanities in particular, often referred to as the "crisis in the humanities," he co-edited with Gordon Hutner the volume A New Deal for the Humanities: Liberal Arts and the Future of Public Higher Education (2016). Ideas with which Mohamed is associated are postsecularism and tyrannicide.

Mohamed is an Egyptian-Canadian born in Edmonton, Alberta. He currently lives in Wilton, Connecticut with his wife, Sally, and two daughters.

== Bibliography ==
· Sovereignty: Seventeenth-Century England and the Making of the Modern Political Imaginary (ISBN 978-0-1988-5213-1)

· Milton and the Post-Secular Present: Ethics, Politics, Terrorism (ISBN 978-0-8047-7651-6)

· In the Anteroom of Divinity: The Reformation of the Angels from Colet to Milton (ISBN 978-0-8020-9792-7)

· Milton's Modernities: Poetry, Philosophy, and History from the Seventeenth Century to the Present, edited with Patrick Fadely (ISBN 978-0-8101-3533-8)

· A New Deal for the Humanities: Liberal Arts and the Future of Public Higher Education, edited with Gordon Hutner (ISBN 978-0-8135-7323-6)

· Milton and Questions of History: Essays by Canadians Past and Present, edited with Mary Nyquist (ISBN 978-1-4426-4392-5)
