= Herman Vanden Berghe =

Belgian geneticist

Herman, Baron Vanden Berghe (Herman van den Berge) (born Overboelare, 12 June 1933, died Oud-Heverlee, 23 January 2017) was a Belgian pioneer in human genetics. He founded the Centrum voor Menselijke Erfelijkheid (Center for Human Genetics) at the medical faculty of the Catholic University of Leuven in Leuven (Louvain), Belgium. He was a cytogeneticist and applied cytogenetics to oncology. Among other findings, he discovered the deletion 5q syndrome in myelodysplasia. A native Flemish-speaker, he was also fluent in a number of other languages, including French and English, which facilitated his international role in medical genetics.

Professor Vanden Berghe was granted the title of Baron by Baudouin I, King of Belgium and from 2000 to 2003 served as chairman of the King Baudouin Foundation. He was a founding member of the International Forum for Biophilosophy established in Belgium by Royal Decree in 1988. The Forum is responsible for the Golden Eurydice Award.

== See also ==
- Flanders Institute for Biotechnology (VIB)
