= Judith Harris (poet) =

American poet

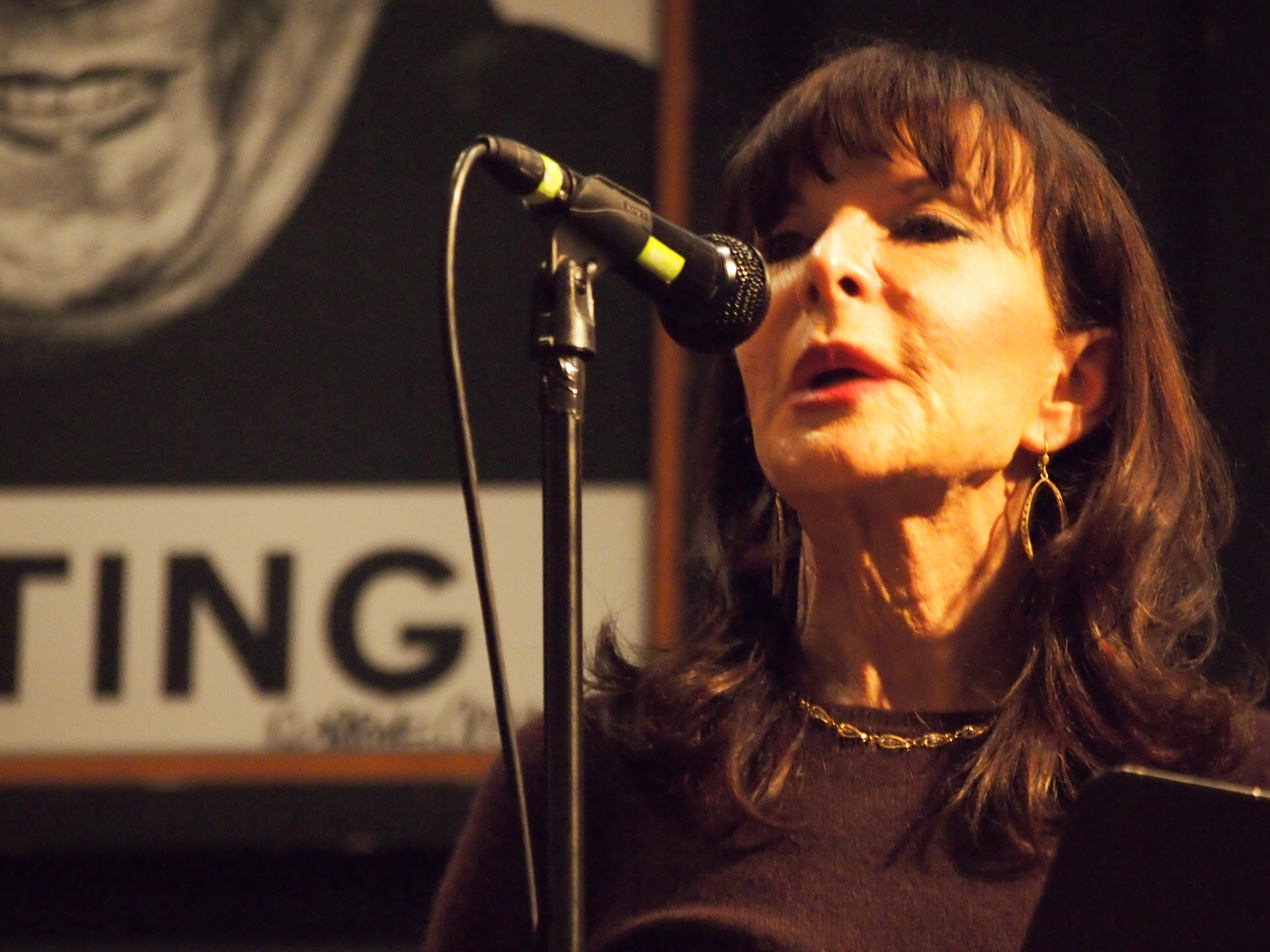
- Born: Washington, D.C.
- Education: University of Maryland, Brown University; George Washington University
- Writing career
- Genre: poetry

Judith Harris is an American poet and the author of Night Garden (Tiger Bark Press, 2013), Atonement (LSU, 2000), The Bad Secret (LSU, 2006), and the critical book Signifying Pain: Constructing and Healing the Self Through Writing (SUNY, 2003). Her poetry has appeared in many publications, including The Nation, The Atlantic, The New Republic, Ploughshares, Slate, Southern Review, Image, Boulevard, Narrative, Verse Daily, and American Life in Poetry. She has taught at the Frost Place and at universities in the Washington, D.C. area.

== Career ==
Judith Harris was born in Washington, D.C. and received a B.A. from University of Maryland, her M.A. from Brown University in Creative Writing, and a Ph.D. from George Washington University in American literature. She has taught at George Washington, Catholic University, George Mason University, and American University, and held residencies at VCCA and Frost Place.

In 2000, LSU Press published Atonement and her second book, The Bad Secret, in 2006. Her renowned critical book, Signifying Pain: Construction and Healing the Self through Writing published by SUNY Press and is taught in many graduate seminars. Elisabeth Young-Bruehl, coauthor of Cherishment: A Psychology of the Heart, said, "Signifying Pain will play an important role in the growing literature on psychoanalysis in education and in the college classroom, as it both shows and tells what a psychoanalytically informed sensibility can bring to understanding poetry. To be able to signify pain is a human triumph; to write about the signifying is, too."

Her third, and most recent, collection of poetry, Night Garden, was published April 2013 by Tiger Bark Press, a literary press founded by Steven Huff, previously the executive director of BOA Editions. On Night Garden, Edward Hirsch said, “Judith Harris creates tableaux of memory and shines a keen light on the particulars of the natural world in these poignant, carefully observed, and scrupulously written poems that ache with mortality. Night Garden is an illuminating book!” Jeanne Marie Beaumont said, “Piercingly visionary and subtly hallucinatory, over and over these poems acknowledge the vast mysterious companionship of the natural world and the fluidity of experienced time. As the poems bring things to notice, whether the hum of Sears fans, the oddments on a basement worktable, or the smell of a pharmacy aisle, they create a new way to be intimate with the physical world. It is as though Keats's “hark!” has awoken this poet to her fullest senses, and there is no turning away. Night Garden is dug deep and flourishing.”

Her essays been published and in many journals and anthologies including Tikkun, College English, The Washingtonian. She has contributed articles to many anthologies and collections on poetry and the history of American poetry including Graywolf Press's After Confession and Simply Lasting: Writers on Jane Kenyon, and interviews of Ted Kooser and Edward Hirsch for The Writer's Chronicle of Associated Writing Programs. Her essay from Simply Lasting was selected to be in American Literature's two volume collection of twentieth century literature. She is a prolific reviewer of poetry with reviews in NEO, Spoon River Review, Psychohistory Forum, American Imago, and Psychoanalysis, Society and Culture (Palgrave).

Her poems have appeared in The Nation, Slate, The Hudson Review, Ploughshares, The New Republic, The Atlantic and Narrative magazine, Southern Review, the American Scholar, Prairie Schooner and American Life in Poetry, which is a syndicated newspaper column edited by Ted Kooser, publishing her work in places such as The New York Times, The Seattle Times, The Philadelphia Inquirer and many others. In 2004, she had the honor of reading at the Library of Congress at the invitation of Donald Hall, then US Poet Laureate, and in 2010 was a discussant with Edward Hirsch at the Folger Shakespeare Library. She is a recipient of grants from Carnegie Mellon, and the DC Commission on the Arts where she resides and continues to teach adults and college students the art of creative writing.

== Books ==
=== Poetry collections ===
Night Garden (Tiger Bark Press, 2013)
Atonement (LSU, 2000)
The Bad Secret (LSU, 2006) Song of the Moon (Orchises, 1983)

=== Critical works ===
Signifying Pain: Constructing and Healing the Self Through Writing (SUNY, 2003)

== Awards ==
- Yaddow Fellowship, 2014
- Individual Artist's Award, D.C. Commission on the Arts & Humanities, 2005
- McCandlish Fellowship, George Washington University, 1984–87
- Poetry Fellow, Virginia Center for the Creative Arts, Sweetbriar College, 1984
- Mellon Fellowship in Creative Writing and Rhetoric, Carnegie-Mellon University, 1984
- Individual Artist's Grant (Poetry), D.C. Commission on the Arts & Humanities1983-86
- University Fellowship, Iowa Writers' Workshop, University of Iowa, 1982
