= Ernst Tugendhat =

Czech-born German philosopher (1930–2023)

- Born: 8 March 1930; Brno, Czechoslovakia
- Died: 13 March 2023 (aged 93); Freiburg, Germany
- Awards: Meister Eckhart Prize

Education
- Education: Stanford University; University of Freiburg
- Thesis: The concept of truth in Edmund Husserl and Martin Heidegger (1966)
- Academic advisor: Martin Heidegger

Philosophical work
- Era: Contemporary philosophy
- Region: Western philosophy
- School: Phenomenology (early); Analytic philosophy (later)
- Institutions: University of Münster; University of Tübingen; University of Heidelberg; Free University of Berlin; Pontificia Universidad Católica de Chile; Charles University
- Main interests: Philosophy of language, self-consciousness
- Notable ideas: Linguistic account of self-consciousness

Ernst Tugendhat (German: [ˈtuːɡəntˌhaːt]; 8 March 1930 – 13 March 2023) was a Czechoslovak-born German philosopher. He was a scion of the wealthy and influential Jewish Tugendhat family. They lived in Venezuela during the Nazi regime, and he studied first at Stanford University, then at Freiburg. He taught internationally in Europe and South America, with a focus on language analysis.

== Life and career ==
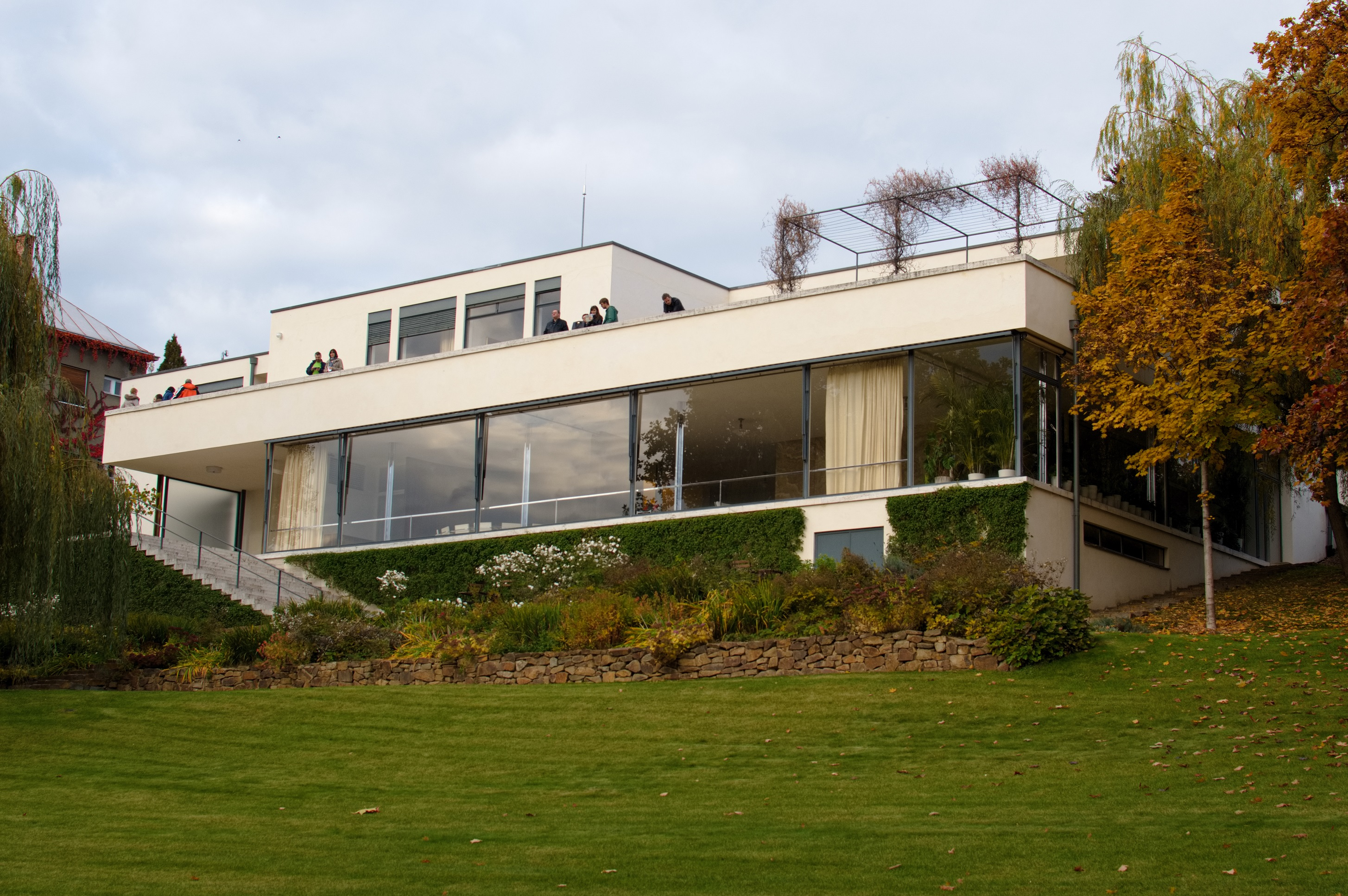
Villa Tugendhat, where Ernst Tugendhat grew up

Tugendhat was born in Brno, Czechoslovakia, to Fritz and Grete (Löw-Beer) Tugendhat, a wealthy Jewish family who had commissioned Mies van der Rohe to design the Villa Tugendhat in Brno. In 1938 the family escaped the Nazi regime, first to St. Gallen, Switzerland, and later to settle in Caracas, Venezuela. Ernst had an older half-sister, Hanna Weiss, and three younger siblings – Herbert, Ruth, and Daniela. The last two children were born after the family migrated to Venezuela.

Tugendhat studied classics at Stanford University from 1944 to 1949, and went on to do graduate work in philosophy and classics at the University of Freiburg. He achieved his doctorate there with a thesis on Aristotle in 1956. During the years 1956 to 1958 he performed post-doctoral research at the University of Münster. From then until 1964 he was an assistant professor in the department of philosophy at the University of Tübingen, where, after spending 1965 lecturing at the University of Michigan in Ann Arbor, he gained his habilitation in 1966 analyzing the concept of truth in Edmund Husserl and Martin Heidegger.

Tugendhat was a professor at the University of Heidelberg from 1966 to 1975. During the 1960s and 1970s, Heidelberg developed into one of the main scenes of the left-wing student protests in Germany. Because of the student movement and as a protest against the situation at German universities in the 1970s, Tugendhat gave up his position and relocated to Starnberg, where Jürgen Habermas worked at the time. In 1980 he moved to Berlin, becoming, like his friend Michael Theunissen, a professor of philosophy at the Free University of Berlin.

Tugendhat retired in 1992, but was a visiting professor in philosophy at the Pontificia Universidad Católica de Chile, Santiago (1992–1996), a researcher at the Institute for Human Sciences, Vienna (1996), and visiting professor at Charles University in Prague (1997–1998).

Tugendhat died in Freiburg on 12 March 2023 at age 93.

== Awards ==
Tugendhat became an honorary professor of the Tübingen University in 1999, and in 2002 a fellow of the Kolleg Friedrich Nietzsche. He received an honorary doctorate from the Universidad Autónoma de Madrid in 2005, and from the University of Zürich in 2009. In 2005 he was awarded the Meister Eckhart Prize; he donated the prize money to a school, "Talitha Kumi", in Beit Jala, Palestine.

== Bibliography ==
Publications by Tugendhat, many of them published by Suhrkamp, are held by the German National Library, including:

- 1958: Ti kata tinos. Karl Alber, Freiburg. ISBN 3-495-48080-3
- 1967: Der Wahrheitsbegriff bei Husserl und Heidegger. de Gruyter, Berlin. ISBN 978-3-11-010289-5
- 1970: "The Meaning of 'Bedeutung' in Frege" (Analysis 30, pp 177–189)
- 1975: Vorlesungen zur Einführung in die sprachanalytische Philosophie. Suhrkamp, Frankfurt am Main. ISBN 3-518-27645-X, In English: Traditional and analytical philosophy. Lectures on the philosophy of language. Transl. by P.A. Gorner. Cambridge University Press, Cambridge 1982.
- 1979: Selbstbewußtsein und Selbstbestimmung. Suhrkamp, Frankfurt. ISBN 3-518-27821-5, In English: Self-consciousness and self-determination. Transl. by Paul Stern. Cambridge, Mass./ London: MIT Press, 1986. (= Studies in contemporary German social thought.)
- 1984: Probleme der Ethik. Reclam, Stuttgart. ISBN 3-15-008250-1
- 1992: Philosophische Aufsätze. Suhrkamp, Frankfurt. ISBN 3-518-28617-X
- 1992: Ethics and Politics
- 1993: Vorlesungen über Ethik. Suhrkamp, Frankfurt. ISBN 3-518-28700-1
- 1995: "The Moral Dilemma in the Rescue of Refugees" (Social Research 62:1)
- 2000: "Zeit und Sein in Heideggers Sein und Zeit" (Sats: Nordic Journal of Philosophy 1.1)
- 2003: Egozentrizität und Mystik. Eine anthropologische Studie. C. H. Beck. ISBN 978-3-406-51049-6 (Translated to English as Tugendhat, Ernst (2016). Egocentricity and mysticism : an anthropological study. Translated by Procyshyn, Alexei; Wenning, Mario. New York: Columbia University Press. ISBN 978-0-231-54293-7.)
- 2007: Anthropologie statt Metaphysik. C. H. Beck. ISBN 978-3-406-55678-4
