= Mary Through the Centuries =

Book by Jaroslav Pelikan

- Author: Jaroslav Pelikan
- Language: English
- Publisher: Yale University Press
- Publication date: 1996
- Publication place: United States
- Pages: 288
- ISBN: 978-0-300-07661-5
- Dewey Decimal: 232.91
- LC Class: BT610 .P45

Mary Through the Centuries: Her Place in the History of Culture is a book by Jaroslav Pelikan, published in New Haven by Yale University Press in 1996. It is based on the 1962 publication of Walter Tappolet, Das Marienlob der Reformatoren. Mary Through The Ages is a collection of texts from Martin Luther, John Calvin, Huldrych Zwingli, and Heinrich Bullinger, whom Pelikan called "the Reformers in Praise of Mary".

== Reformers in praise of Mary ==
Mary Through the Centuries: Her Place in the History of Culture includes sermons, theological works, and devotion-oriented text to document his claim that the Protestant reformers continued the traditional Catholic teachings on Mary in such areas as perpetual virginity and Theotokos. Biblical texts which might cast shadows or raise questions are interpreted in line with Catholic teachings. Thus, the biblically mentioned brothers of Jesus – whose existence would undermine the claim of the perpetual virginity of Mary – were actually cousins according to Martin Luther.

Luther clearly opposed what he considered Catholic exaggerations of Mary, but her strong faith is to him, according to Pelikan, a model of a Christian life lived by faith alone (sola fide): "Mary became the obvious case study of this for Luther, as the opening words of Mary's Magnificat showed him that 'holiness of spirit... consists in nothing else than faith pure and simple.'"

Mary Through the Centuries takes issue with the notion that the Marian views of Luther and other reformers are nothing but traces of the past. Mary is vital for their theology centering on the divinity of Christ. Thus Mary is, in the theology of Martin Luther, "the guarantee of the reality of the incarnation and of the human nature of Christ."

== Controversial views ==
Mary Through the Centuries addresses also controversial theological topics such as "the development of Mariology within the Catholic Church" over the centuries and, by implications, the last two Marian dogmas of 1854 and 1950. For biblical scholars and sola scriptura theologians, this is a difficult topic. Mary Through the Centuries views development positively and points out that other Christian beliefs, not contained in the Bible as such, were formulated later as well, such as the concept of the Trinity and the Nicene Creed, a view which raised discussion and controversy.

== See also ==
- Mariology
