= Clare Cavanagh =

American literary critic, Slavist and translator

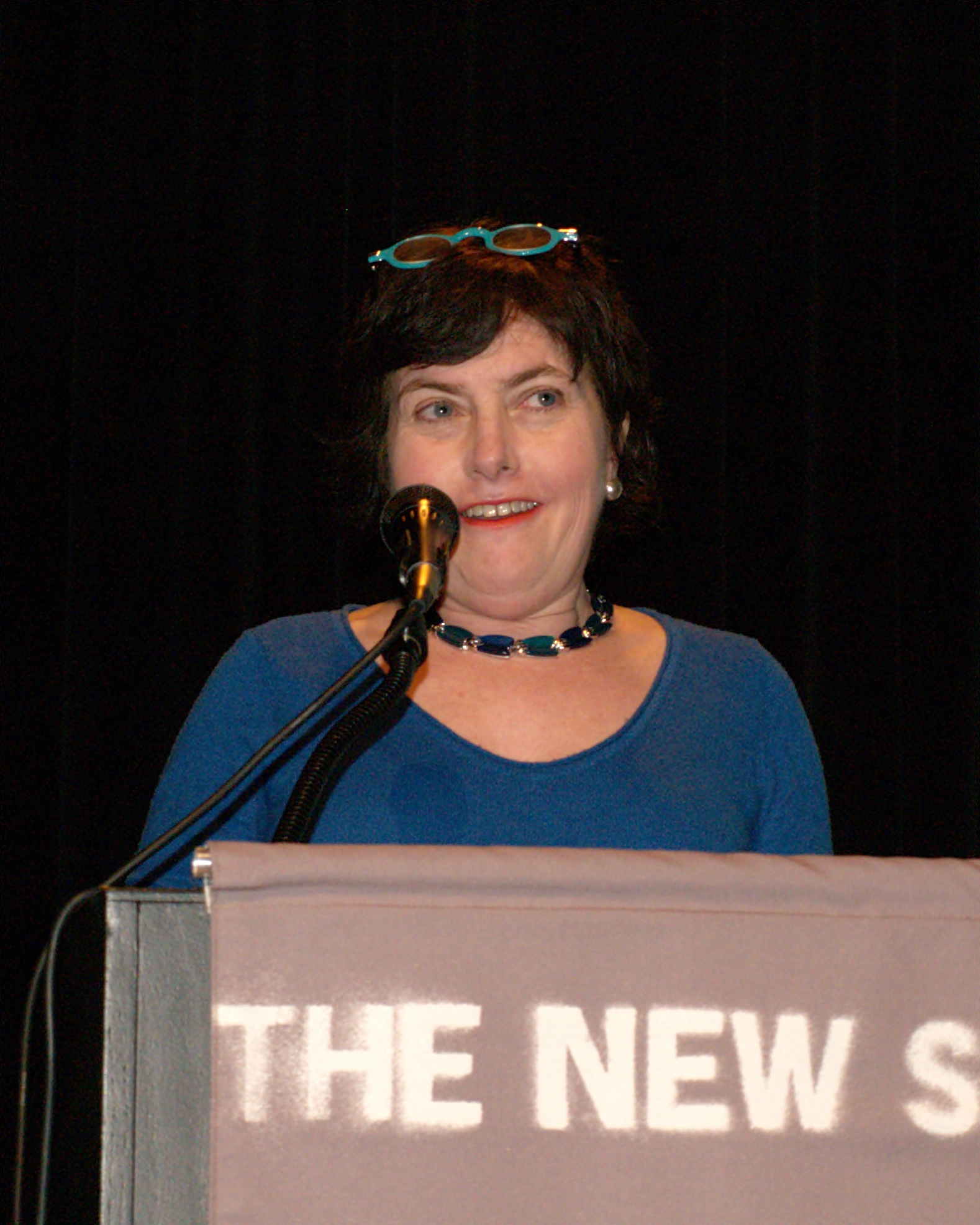
- Clare Cavanagh at the 2010 National Book Critics Circle awards
- Born: 23 May 1956 (age 70)
- Education: Harvard University (Ph.D.)
- Occupations: Translator, critic, professor
- Writing career
- Genres: Translation, literary criticism
- Notable awards: National Book Critics Circle Award, William Riley Parker Prize

Clare Cavanagh (born May 23, 1956) is an American literary critic, a Slavist, and a translator. She is the Frances Hooper Professor in the Arts and Humanities and Chair of the Department of Slavic Languages and Literatures at Northwestern University. An acclaimed translator of contemporary Polish poetry, she is currently under contract to write the authorized biography of Czesław Miłosz. She holds a B.A from the University of California, Santa Cruz, and an M.A. and PhD from Harvard University (1978, 1981 and 1988 respectively). Before coming to Northwestern University, she taught at the University of Wisconsin, Madison. Her work has been translated into Russian, Polish, Hungarian, French, Dutch, Chinese, and Japanese.

She has published a paper about post-colonial literature of Poland.

== Awards and honors ==
Her honors include: the National Book Critics Circle Award for Criticism for Lyric Poetry and Modern Politics: Russia, Poland, and the West. the William Riley Parker Prize of the Modern Language Association; the AATSEEL Prize for Outstanding Scholarly Book in Slavic Literature; the Ilchester Lecture in Slavonic Literatures, Oxford University; the John Frederick Nims Memorial Prize in Translation; the Katharine Washburne Memorial Lecture in Translation; the PEN/Book-of-the Month Club Prize for Outstanding Literary Translation; the AATSEEL Award for Outstanding Translation from a Slavic Language; elected to the American Academy of Arts and Sciences in 2019. Cavanagh's essays and translations “have appeared in TLS, The New York Times Book Review, The New Republic, The New Yorker, The New York Review of Books, Bookforum, Partisan Review, Common Knowledge, Poetry, Literary Imagination and other periodicals.”

== Selected bibliography ==
=== Books ===
- Czeslaw Milosz and His Age: A Critical Life. Under contract, Farrar Straus, Giroux.
- Lyric Poetry and Modern Politics: Russia, Poland, and the West. Yale University Press (January 5, 2010), ISBN 0300152965, ISBN 978-0300152968
- Osip Mandelstam and the Modernist Creation of Tradition. Princeton University Press (November 14, 1994), ISBN 0691036829, ISBN 978-0691036823

=== Edited books ===
- Princeton Encyclopedia of Poetry and Poetics, Roland Greene, editor-in-chief, Stephen Cushman, general editor, Clare Cavanagh, Jahan Ramazani, Paul Rouzer, associate editors, Princeton University Press, 2012.

=== Translations ===
- Map: Collected and Last Poems, Wislawa Szymborska, ed. Clare Cavanagh, tr. Clare Cavanagh, Stanislaw Baranczak. Houghton Mifflin Harcourt (April 7, 2015), ISBN 0544126025, ISBN 978-0544126022
- Unseen Hand: Poems, Adam Zagajewski, tr. Clare Cavanagh. Farrar, Straus and Giroux; Reprint edition (June 5, 2012), ISBN 0374533369, ISBN 978-0374533366
- Here, Wislawa Szymborska, tr. Clare Cavanagh, Stanislaw Baranczak. Mariner Books (August 7, 2012), ISBN 0547592094, ISBN 978-0547592091
- Eternal Enemies, Adam Zagajewski, tr. Clare Cavanagh. Farrar, Straus and Giroux (March 31, 2009), ISBN 0374531609, ISBN 978-0374531607
- Monologue of a Dog, Wislawa Szymborska. Co-translator with Stanislaw Baranczak. Foreword by former U.S. Poet Laureate Billy Collins. Harcourt (November 7, 2005), ISBN 0151012202, ISBN 978-0151012206
- A Defense of Ardor, Adam Zagajewski, tr. Clare Cavanagh. Farrar Straus Giroux (October 19, 2004), ISBN 0374529884, ISBN 978-0374529888
- Nonrequired Reading: Selected Prose, Wislawa Szymborska, tr. Clare Cavanagh. Houghton Mifflin Harcourt (October 28, 2002), ISBN 0151006601, ISBN 978-0151006601
- View with a Grain of Sand: Selected Poems, Wislawa Szymborska, co-tr. Clare Cavanagh with Stanislaw Baranczak. Harcourt Brace (May 26, 1995), ISBN 0156002167, ISBN 978-0156002165
- Spoiling Cannibals' Fun: Polish Poetry of the Last Two Decades of Communist Rule, ed. and tr. Clare Cavanagh with Stanislaw Baranczak. Northwestern University Press, (December 1991), ISBN 0810109824, ISBN 978-0810109827

== See also ==
- Russian Literature
- Osip Mandelstam
- Adam Zagajewski
- Wisława Szymborska
- Czesław Miłosz
- Joseph Brodsky
- 20th-century lyric poetry
- Culture during the Cold War
- American poetry
- Russian poetry
- Polish poetry
- Literary criticism
- Translation
- Modernist poetry
- Stanisław Barańczak
- National Book Critics Circle Award
