= Journal of International Political Theory =

- Discipline: Politics
- Language: English

Publication details
- History: 2005-present
- Publisher: SAGE Publications
- Frequency: Triannual

Standard abbreviations
- ISO 4: J. Int. Political Theory

Indexing
- ISSN: 1755-0882 (print); 1755-1722 (web)
- OCLC no.: 259370335

Links
- Journal homepage; Online access

The Journal of International Political Theory is a triannual peer-reviewed academic journal published by SAGE Publications. It was published by Edinburgh University Press between 2005 and 2013. The founding editor, and editor-in-chief until 2020, was Patrick Hayden (University of St Andrews). As of 2021, the editor-in-chief is Anthony F Lang, Jr (University of St Andrews).

== Abstracting and indexing ==
The journal is abstracted and indexed in:

- Emerging Sources Citation Index
- Scopus
- ProQuest
- EBSCO
