= Steven J. Dick =

American astronomer and author (born 1949)

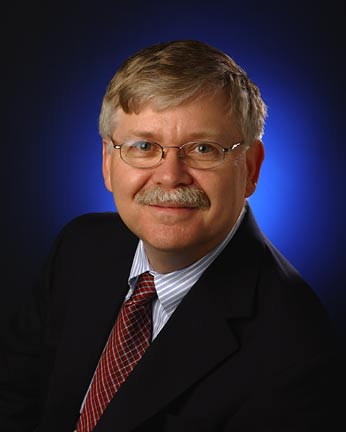
- NASA photo
- Born: October 24, 1949 (age 76); Evansville, Indiana
- Education: Indiana University Bloomington
- Scientific career
- Fields: Astrobiology; History of Science
- Workplaces: U.S. Naval Observatory; NASA; Library of Congress

Steven J. Dick (born October 24, 1949, Evansville, Indiana) is an American astronomer, author, and historian of science most noted for his work in the field of astrobiology. Dick served as the chief historian for the National Aeronautics and Space Administration (NASA) from 2003 to 2009 and as the Baruch S. Blumberg NASA/Library of Congress Chair in Astrobiology from 2013 to 2014. Before that, he was an astronomer and historian of science at the United States Naval Observatory in Washington, DC, from 1979 to 2003.

== Early life and education ==
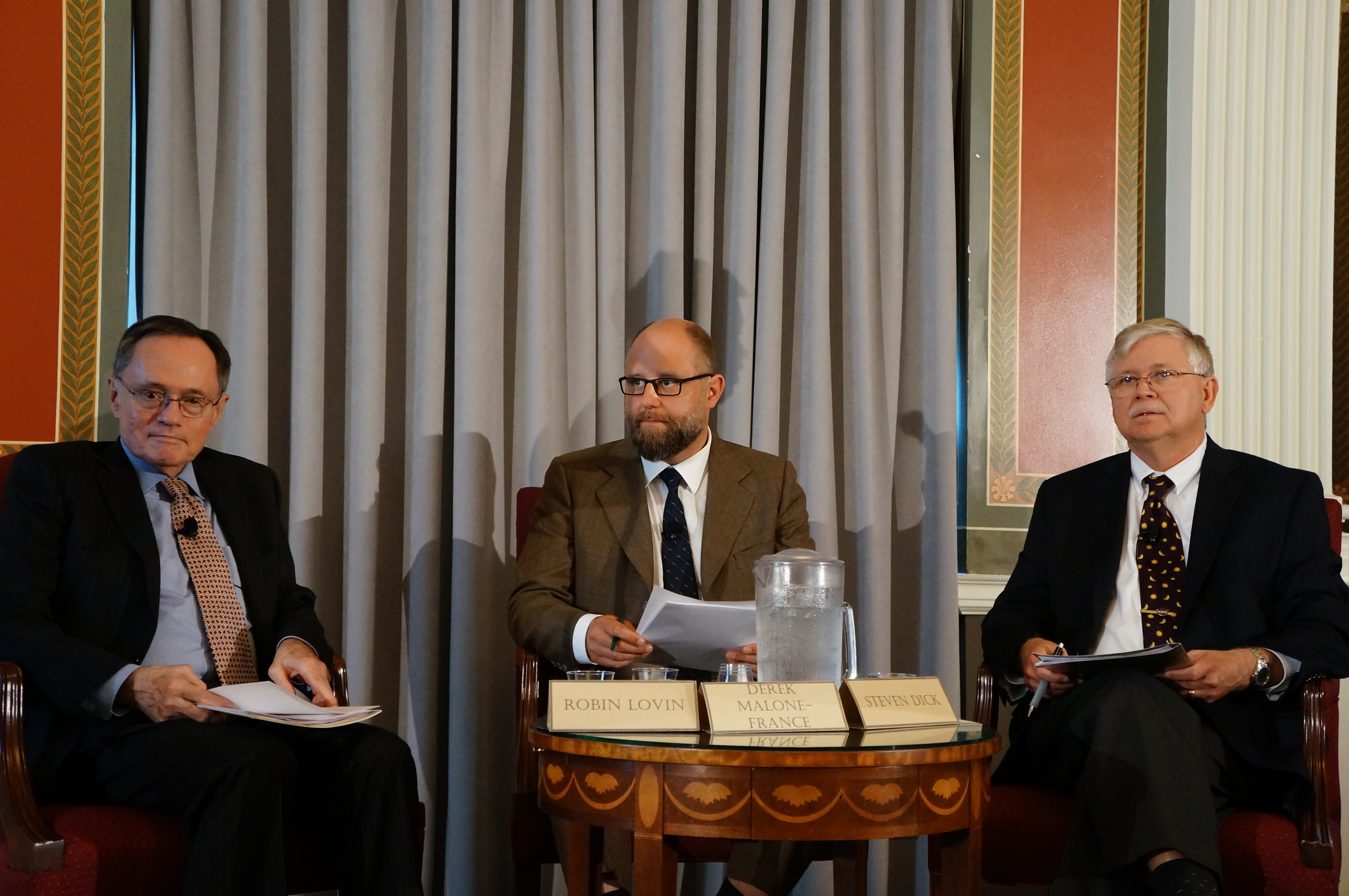
In June 2014, the John W. Kluge Center of the Library of Congress held a seminar focusing on astrobiology. Panel members (l to r) Robin Lovin, Derek Malone-France, and Steven J. Dick

Dick graduated from Mt. Vernon High School in 1967. He received a Bachelor of Science in astrophysics from Indiana University Bloomington in 1971. He earned a Master of Arts in 1974 and a Ph.D. in 1977 in the history and philosophy of science, both from Indiana University.

== Career ==
For 24 years, Dick worked as an astronomer and historian of science for United States Naval Observatory in Washington, D.C., including three years at the Naval Observatory's Southern Hemisphere station in New Zealand. There he was part of a team using transit telescopes and astrographs to chart the northern and southern skies. During this time, he also wrote the history of the Observatory, the first national observatory of the United States, published as Sky and Ocean Joined: The U. S. Naval Observatory, 1830-2000.

In 2003, he was named the Chief Historian for the National Aeronautics and Space Administration. During his years at NASA, Dick wrote on the importance of exploration to society, commissioned numerous histories of spaceflight, and edited several volumes on the societal impact of space flight and on the occasion of the 50th anniversaries of NASA and the space age.

Dick served as Chairman of the Historical Astronomy Division of the American Astronomical Society (1993–1994), as President of the History of Astronomy Commission of the International Astronomical Union (1997–2000) and as President of the Philosophical Society of Washington. He is on the editorial board for the Journal for the History of Astronomy and the Journal of Astronomical History and Heritage. From 2011 to 2012 he held the Charles A. Lindbergh Chair in Aerospace History at the National Air & Space Museum. In 2013 Dick was named the Baruch S. Blumberg NASA/Library of Congress Chair in Astrobiology.

== Astrobiology ==
Dick received the NASA Group Achievement Award "for initiating the new NASA multidisciplinary program in astrobiology, including the definition of the field of astrobiology, the formulation and initial establishment of the NASA Astrobiology Institute, and the development of a Roadmap to guide future NASA investments in astrobiology."

Dick's published work in the field of astrobiology includes Plurality of Worlds: The Origins of the Extraterrestrial Life Debate from Democritus to Kant (Cambridge University Press, 1982); The Biological Universe: The Twentieth Century Extraterrestrial Life Debate and the Limits of Science (Cambridge University Press, 1996); Life on Other Worlds: The 20th Century Extraterrestrial Life Debate (1998), and, with James Strick, The Living Universe: NASA and the Development of Astrobiology (2005). They argue that since the ancient Greeks, extraterrestrial life has been a theme tied to scientific cosmologies, including the ancient atomist, Copernican, Cartesian, and Newtonian worldviews. Dick argues that from an epistemological point of view the methods of astrobiology in the twentieth century are as empirical as in any historical science such as astronomy or geology. Dick has also surveyed the field of astrobiology in "Critical Issues in the History, Philosophy, and Sociology of Astrobiology" (Astrobiology, Volume 12, Number 10, 2012). On December 4, 2013, while holding the NASA/Library of Congress Chair in Astrobiology, Dick testified on astrobiology before the U.S. House of Representatives Committee on Science, Space, and Technology, arguing that SETI funding should be restored and integrated with the NASA astrobiology program.

=== Intelligence Principle ===
The intelligence principle is a hypothetical idea of Dick's in the field of cultural evolution. Outlined in his 2003 paper "Cultural Evolution, the Postbiological Universe and SETI", the intelligence principle describes a potential binding tendency among all intelligent societies, both terrestrial and extraterrestrial:

The maintenance, improvement and perpetuation of knowledge and intelligence is the central driving force of cultural evolution, and that to the extent intelligence can be improved, it will be improved.

== Honors ==
Dick is the recipient of the NASA Exceptional Service Medal and the Navy Meritorious Civilian Service Medal. In 2006, Dick received the LeRoy E. Doggett Prize from the American Astronomical Society for a career that has significantly influenced the field of the history of astronomy. Also in 2006, Dick was selected to deliver the first Billingham Cutting Edge Lecture, at the International Astronautical Congress in Valencia, Spain. In 2009, minor planet 6544 Stevendick was named in his honor. In 2012, he was elected a Fellow of the American Association for the Advancement of Science.

== Selected publications ==
- Plurality of Worlds: The Origins of the Extraterrestrial Life Debate from Democritus to Kant (Cambridge University Press, 1982) ISBN 0-521-31985-4
- The Biological Universe: The Twentieth Century Extraterrestrial Life Debate and the Limits of Science (Cambridge University Press, 1996) ASIN B000UUKKY6
- Life on Other Worlds: The 20th Century Extraterrestrial Life Debate (Cambridge University Press, 2001) ISBN 0-521-79912-0
- Many Worlds: The New Universe, Extraterrestrial Life and the Theological Implications (Templeton Foundation Press, 2000) ISBN 1-890151-42-4
- The Living Universe: NASA and the Development of Astrobiology (Rutgers University Press, 2005) (co-authored with James Strick) ISBN 0-8135-3733-9
- Sky and Ocean Joined – The U.S. Naval Observatory 1830-2000 (Cambridge University Press, 2003) ISBN 0-521-81599-1
- Editor (with Roger Launius), Critical Issues in the History of Spaceflight (NASA SP 4702, 2006)
- Editor (with Roger Launius), "Societal Impact of Spaceflight" (NASA SP 4801, 2007)
- Editor (with Neil Armstrong et al.), America in Space: NASA's First Fifty Years, (Abrams, 2007).
- Editor, Remembering the Space Age (NASA SP 4703, 2008)
- Editor (with Mark Lupisella), Cosmos and Culture: Cultural Evolution in a Cosmic Context (NASA SP 4802, 2009)
- Editor, NASA's First 50 Years: Historical Perspectives (NASA SP 4704, 2010)
- Discovery and Classification in Astronomy: Controversy and Consensus (Cambridge University Press, 2013)
- Editor, Historical Studies in the Societal Impact of Spaceflight (NASA, 2015)
- Editor, The Impact of Discovering Life Beyond Earth (Cambridge University Press, 2015).
- Astrobiology, Discovery, and Societal Impact: Controversy and Consensus (Cambridge University Press, 2018).
- Classifying the Cosmos: How We Can Make Sense of the Celestial Landscape (Springer, 2019).
- Space, Time, and Aliens: Collected Works on Cosmos and Culture (Springer, 2020).

== See also ==
- Megatrajectory
- Sociology of knowledge
- Intelligence explosion
