= Meister Eckhart Prize =

Philosophy award

The Meister Eckhart Prize was a biennial award consisting of a prize of €50,000 given between 2001 and 2014 to "thinkers who produce high-quality work on the subject of identity" by the Identity Foundation. The prize was named after Meister Eckhart (1260–1328), a German theologian, philosopher and mystic.

== Award recipients ==
- 2001: Richard Rorty
- 2003: Claude Lévi-Strauss
- 2005: Ernst Tugendhat
- 2007: Amartya Sen
- 2009: Amitai Etzioni
- 2012: Michel Serres
- 2014: Seyla Benhabib

== See also ==
- Meister Eckhart
- List of general awards in the humanities
