= Edward Hirsch =

American poet and critic (born 1950)

External videos
- Interview with Edward Hirsch at BigThink.com February 25, 2010, 34 mins, video.
- Edward Hirsch on falling in love with poetry, HoCoPoLitSo, May 1, 2012
- A Conversation on Writing with Edward Hirsch, ConnectLiterature, May 7, 2012

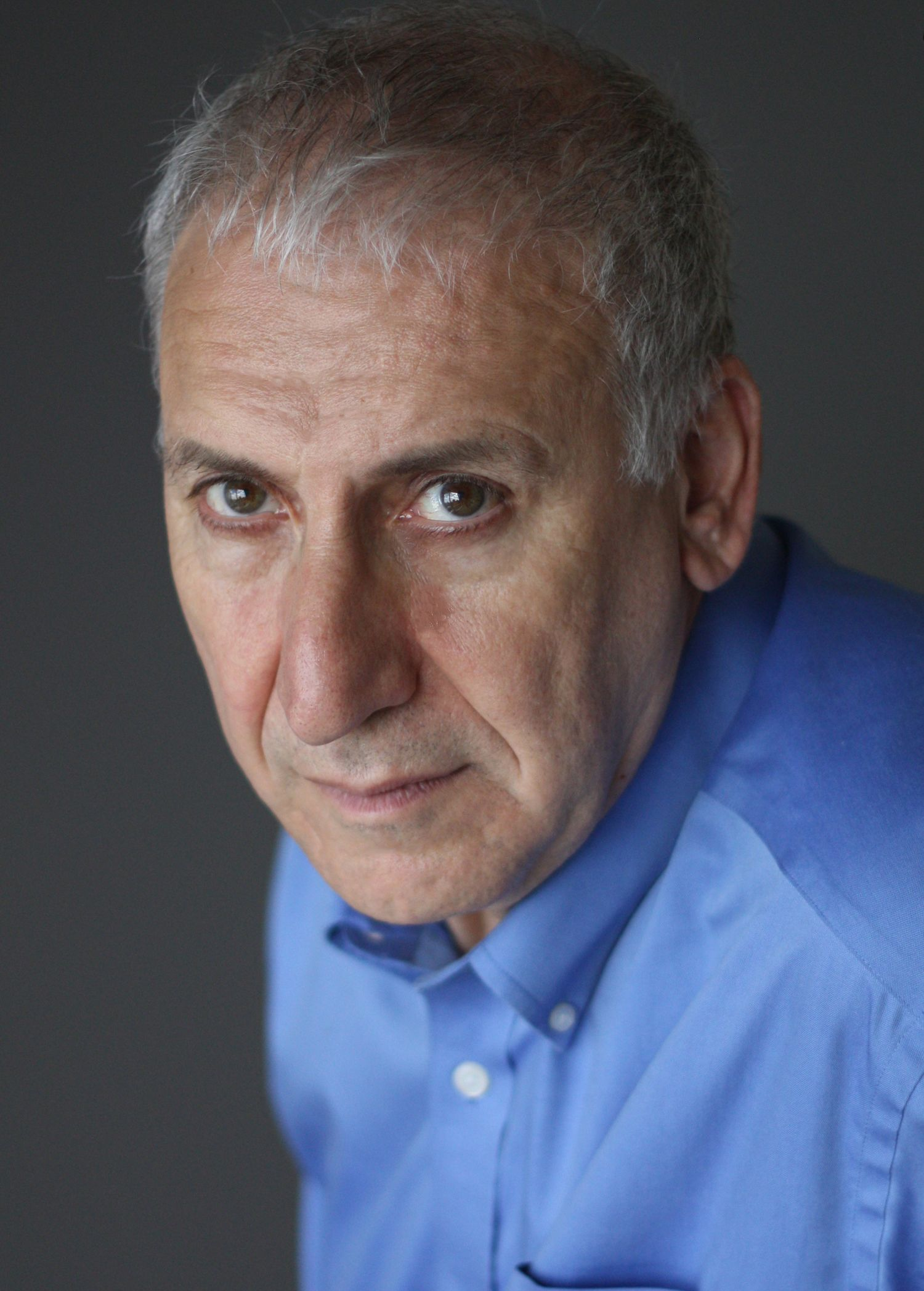
Edward Hirsch

Edward M. Hirsch (born January 20, 1950) is an American poet and critic who wrote a national bestseller about reading poetry. He has published nine books of poems, including The Living Fire: New and Selected Poems (2010), which brings together thirty-five years of work, and Gabriel: A Poem (2014), a book-length elegy for his son that The New Yorker called "a masterpiece of sorrow." He has also published five prose books about poetry. He is president of the John Simon Guggenheim Memorial Foundation in New York City.

== Life ==
Hirsch was born in Chicago. He had a childhood involvement with poetry, which he later explored at Grinnell College and the University of Pennsylvania, where he received a PhD in folklore. He is Jewish.

Hirsch was a professor of English at Wayne State University. In 1985, he joined the faculty at the University of Houston, where he spent 17 years as a professor in the Creative Writing Program and Department of English. He was appointed the fourth president of the John Simon Guggenheim Foundation on September 3, 2002. He holds seven honorary degrees.

== Career ==
Hirsch is a well-known advocate for poetry whose essays have been published in the American Poetry Review, The New York Times Book Review, The New York Review of Books, and elsewhere. He wrote a weekly column on poetry for The Washington Post Book World from 2002 to 2005, which resulted in his book Poet’s Choice (2006). His other prose books include Responsive Reading (1999), The Demon and the Angel: Searching for the Source of Artistic Inspiration (2002), and A Poet's Glossary (2014), a complete compendium of poetic terms. He is the editor of Transforming Vision: Writers on Art (1994), Theodore Roethke’s Selected Poems (2005) and To a Nightingale (2007). He is the co-editor of A William Maxwell Portrait: Memories and Appreciations and The Making of a Sonnet: A Norton Anthology (2008). He also edits the series "The Writer’s World" (Trinity University Press).

Hirsch's first collection of poems, For the Sleepwalkers, received the Lavan Younger Poets Award from the Academy of American Poets and the Delmore Schwartz Memorial Award from New York University. His second book, Wild Gratitude, received the National Book Critics Circle Award in 1986. He was awarded a Guggenheim Fellowship in 1985 and a five-year MacArthur Fellowship in 1997. He received the William Riley Parker Prize from the Modern Language Association for the best scholarly essay in PMLA for the year 1991. He has also received an Ingram Merrill Foundation Award, a National Endowment for the Arts Fellowship, the Rome Prize from the American Academy in Rome, a Pablo Neruda Presidential Medal of Honor, and the American Academy of Arts and Letters Award for Literature. He is a former Chancellor of the Academy of American Poets. A volume of his poetry, Earthly Measures, was selected by critic Harold Bloom for inclusion on his list of works defining the Western Canon. Hirsch's book How to Read a Poem and Fall in Love with Poetry (1999) was a surprise bestseller and is widely taught throughout the country.

== Works ==
=== Poetry collections ===
- For the Sleepwalkers, (New York: Alfred A. Knopf, 1981)
- Wild Gratitude, (New York: Alfred A. Knopf, 1986)
- The Night Parade, (New York: Alfred A. Knopf, 1989)
- Earthly Measures, (New York: Alfred A. Knopf, 1994) ISBN 0-679-76566-2
- On Love, (New York: Alfred A. Knopf, 1998)
- Lay Back the Darkness (New York: Alfred A. Knopf, 2003) ISBN 0-375-41521-1
- Special Orders (New York: Alfred A. Knopf, 2008) ISBN 0-307-26681-8
- The Living Fire : New And Selected Poems (New York: Alfred A. Knopf, 2010) ISBN 978-0375710032
- Gabriel: A Poem (New York: Alfred A. Knopf, 2014) ISBN 978-0-385-35357-1
- Stranger By Night (New York: Alfred A. Knopf, 2020) ISBN 978-0-525-65778-1

=== Non-fiction books ===
- Transforming Vision: Writers on Art, Selected and Introduced by Edward Hirsch, (Boston: Little, Brown, 1994) ISBN 0-8212-2126-4
- How to Read a Poem and Fall in Love with Poetry, (New York: Harcourt Brace, 1999) ISBN 0-15-100419-6
- Responsive Reading, (1999)
- 'Introduction' in John Keats, Complete Poems and Selected Letters of John Keats, (New York: Modern Library, 2001) ISBN 0-375-75669-8
- The Demon and the Angel: Searching for the Source of Artistic Expression, (New York: Harcourt Brace, 2002)
- Poet's Choice, (New York: Harcourt, 2006) ISBN 0-15-101356-X
- A Poet's Glossary, (Boston & New York: Houghton Mifflin Harcourt, 2014) ISBN 978-0-15-101195-7
- 100 Poems To Break Your Heart, (New York: HarperCollins Publishers, 2021) ISBN 978-0544931886
- The Heart of American Poetry, (Library of America, 2022) ISBN 978-1598537260
- My Childhood in Pieces: A Stand-Up Comedy, a Skokie Elegy, (Knopf), 2025 ISBN 978-0593802823

=== Editor ===
- Transforming Vision: Writers on Art, (The Art Institute of Chicago/ Bulfinch Press, 1994) ISBN 978-0821221266
- A William Maxwell Portrait, (Norton, 2004) ISBN 978-0393057713
- Theodore Roethke: Selected Poems, (The Library of America, 2005) ISBN 978-1931082785
- Irish Writers on Writing, edited with Eavan Boland, (Trinity University Press, 2007) ISBN 9781595340320
- Polish Writers on Writing, edited with Adam Zagajewski, (Trinity University Press, 2007) ISBN 9781595340337
- To a Nightingale: Poems from Sappho to Borges, (Braziller, 2007) ISBN 978-0807616277
- The Making of a Sonnet, (Norton, 2008) ISBN 978-0393333534
- Hebrew Writers on Writing, edited with Peter Cole (Trinity University Press, 2008) ISBN 9781595340528
- Nineteenth-Century American Writers on Writing, edited with Brenda Wineapple (Trinity University Press, 2010) ISBN 9781595340696
- Chinese Writers on Writing, edited with Arthur Sze (Trinity University Press, 2010) ISBN 9781595340634
- Romanian Writers on Writing, edited with Norman Manea, (Trinity University Press, 2011) ISBN 9781595340825
- 100 Poems To Break Your Heart, (Boston: Houghton Mifflin Harcourt, 2021)ISBN 978-0-544-93188-6
