= Margaret Waller =

American French literature scholar

Margaret "Peggy" Waller (born 1954) is an American scholar of 19th-century French literature. She was the Mary Ann Vanderzyl Reynolds Professor of Humanities and Professor of Romance Languages and Literatures at Pomona College in Claremont, California until her retirement in 2024.

== Early life and education ==
Waller graduated summa cum laude from Lawrence University in 1976 with a degree in French. She then earned a doctorate in French from Columbia University, finishing in 1986.

== Career ==
Waller's works include a translation of Revolution in Poetic Language, a book by Julia Kristeva, and The Male Malady: Fictions of Impotence in the French Romantic Novel, published in 1993.
