= Critical Inquiry =

- Discipline: Humanities
- Language: English
- Edited by: Heather Keenleyside, Daniel Morgan

Publication details
- History: 1974-present
- Publisher: University of Chicago Press (United States)
- Frequency: Quarterly
- Impact factor: 1.4 (2024)

Standard abbreviations
- ISO 4: Crit. Inq.

Indexing
- ISSN: 0093-1896 (print); 1539-7858 (web)
- LCCN: 75644296
- JSTOR: 00931896
- OCLC no.: 2241746

Links
- Journal homepage; Online access; Online archive

Critical Inquiry is a quarterly peer-reviewed academic journal in the humanities published by the University of Chicago Press. While the topics and historical periods it covers are diverse, the journal is known as a long-standing, highly regarded critical theory driven venue for interpretive scholarship, especially but not exclusively in literature and textual criticism. It was established in 1974 by Wayne Booth, Arthur Heiserman, and Sheldon Sacks. From 1978 to 2020, the journal was edited by W. J. T. Mitchell. Since June 2020 it has been edited by different co-editors.

The journal has been called "one of the best known and most influential journals in the world" by the Chicago Tribune and "academe's most prestigious theory journal" by the New York Times.
