= Jaroslav Pelikan =

American Christian scholar (1923–2006)

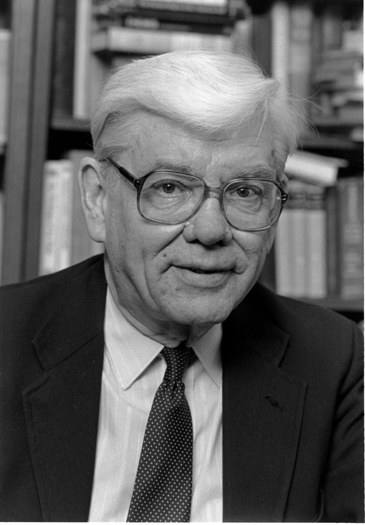
- Born: Jaroslav Jan Pelikan; December 17, 1923; Akron, Ohio, US
- Died: May 13, 2006 (aged 82); Hamden, Connecticut, US
- Spouse: Sylvia Burica (m. 1946)

Academic background
- Education: Concordia Seminary; University of Chicago
- Thesis: Luther and the Confessio Bohemica of 1535 (1946)
- Doctoral advisor: Wilhelm Pauck

Academic work
- Discipline: History; theology
- Sub-discipline: Ecclesiastical history; historical theology
- Institutions: Yale University; University of Chicago
- Doctoral students: Ruth Mazo Karras; H. C. Erik Midelfort; Ron Sider
- Notable students: Mark McIntosh; Robert Moynihan
- Notable works: The Christian Tradition (1971–1989)
- Influenced: Philip Hefner

Signature
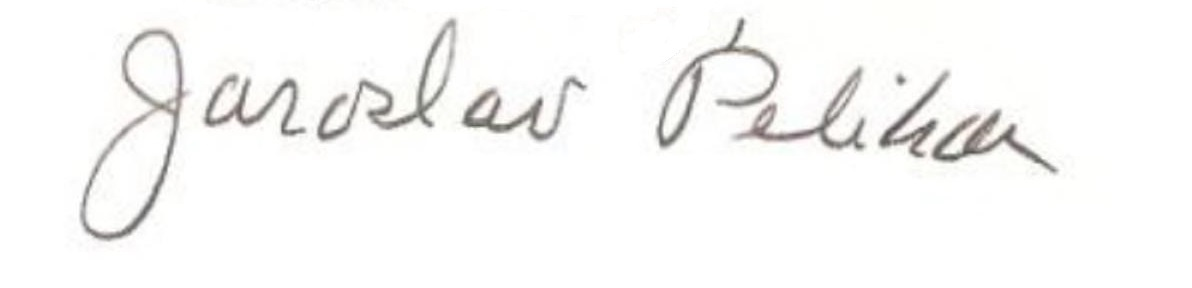

Jaroslav Jan Pelikan Jr. (/ˈjɑːrəslɑːv ˈpɛlɪkən/; December 17, 1923 – May 13, 2006) was an American scholar of the history of Christianity, Christian theology, and medieval intellectual history at Yale University.

== Early years ==
Jaroslav Jan Pelikan Jr. was born on December 17, 1923, in Akron, Ohio, to a Slovak father Jaroslav Jan Pelikan Sr. and Slovak mother Anna Buzekova Pelikan from Šid in Serbia. His father was pastor of Trinity Slovak Lutheran Church in Chicago, Illinois. His paternal grandfather was a Lutheran pastor in Chicago, and in 1902, a charter founder, and later president of, the Synod of Evangelical Lutheran Churches, which until 1958 was known as the Slovak Evangelical Lutheran Church, a strictly conservative orthodox church of the Augsburg Confession.

According to family members, Pelikan's mother taught him how to use a typewriter when he was three years old because he could not yet hold a pen properly but wanted to write. Pelikan's facility with languages may be traced to his multilingual childhood and early training. That facility was to serve him well in the career he ultimately chose (after contemplating becoming a concert pianist) as an historian of Christian doctrine. He did not confine his studies to Roman Catholic and Protestant theological history, but also embraced that of the Christian East.

In 1946, when he was 22, he earned both a seminary degree from Concordia Seminary in St. Louis, Missouri and a PhD at the University of Chicago.

== Writings and interviews ==
Pelikan wrote more than 30 books, including the five-volume The Christian Tradition: A History of the Development of Doctrine (1971–1989). Some of his later works attained crossover appeal, reaching beyond the scholarly sphere into the general reading public, notably, Mary Through the Centuries, Jesus Through the Centuries, and Whose Bible Is It?.

His 1983 Jefferson Lecture, The Vindication of Tradition, included an often quoted one liner, which he elaborated in a 1989 interview in U.S. News & World Report. He said:

Tradition is the living faith of the dead; traditionalism is the dead faith of the living. Tradition lives in conversation with the past, while remembering where we are and when we are and that it is we who have to decide. Traditionalism supposes that nothing should ever be done for the first time, so all that is needed to solve any problem is to arrive at the supposedly unanimous testimony of this homogenized tradition.

== Yale University professor ==
He joined Yale University in 1962 as the Titus Street Professor of Ecclesiastical History and in 1972 was named Sterling Professor of History, a position he held until achieving emeritus status in 1996. He served as acting dean and then dean of the Graduate School from 1973 to 1978 and was the William Clyde DeVane Lecturer 1984–1986 and again in the fall of 1995. Awards include the Graduate School's 1979 Wilbur Cross Medal and the Medieval Academy of America's 1985 Haskins Medal.

While at Yale, Pelikan won a contest sponsored by Field & Stream magazine for Ed Zern's column "Exit Laughing" to translate the motto of the Madison Avenue Rod, Gun, Bloody Mary & Labrador Retriever Benevolent Association ("Keep your powder, your trout flies and your martinis dry") into Latin. Pelikan's winning entry mentioned the martini first, but Pelikan explained that it seemed no less than fitting to have the apéritif come first. His winning entry:

Semper siccandae sunt: potio
Pulvis, et pelliculatio.

Pelikan was appointed to numerous leadership positions in American intellectual life. He was the president of the American Academy of Arts and Sciences and an elected member of the American Philosophical Society. He was editor of the religion section of Encyclopædia Britannica, and, in 1980, he founded the Council of Scholars at the Library of Congress.

In 1983 the National Endowment for the Humanities selected him to deliver the 12th annual Jefferson Lecture, the highest honor conferred by the federal government for outstanding achievement in the humanities. Pelikan's lecture became the basis for his book The Vindication of Tradition.

Pelikan gave the 1992–1993 Gifford lectures at the University of Aberdeen, which were published as the book Christianity and Classical Culture.

President Bill Clinton appointed Pelikan to serve on the President's Committee on the Arts and Humanities. Pelikan received honorary degrees from 42 universities around the world. At the age of 80, he was appointed scholarly director for the "Institutions of Democracy Project" at the Annenberg Foundation.

In 2004, having received the John W. Kluge Prize for Lifetime Achievement in the Human Sciences, an honor he shared with the French philosopher Paul Ricoeur, Pelikan donated his award of $500,000 to Saint Vladimir's Orthodox Theological Seminary, of which he was a trustee. At the ceremony, he quoted a leitmotif passage from Johann Wolfgang von Goethe that had moved him all his life: "Was du ererbt von deinen Vaetern hast, Erwirb es um es zu besitzen" ("What you have inherited from your fathers, earn the right to possess it.").

== Lutheran pastor to Orthodox layman ==
For most of his life Pelikan was a Lutheran and was a pastor in that tradition. He was an ordained pastor in the Lutheran Church–Missouri Synod before becoming a member of a Lutheran Church in America congregation, which subsequently became part of the Evangelical Lutheran Church in America (ELCA).

In 1998, however, he and his wife Sylvia left the ELCA and were received into the Orthodox Church in America at the Chapel of St. Vladimir's Orthodox Theological Seminary in Crestwood, New York. According to family members, his conversion followed his meeting Pope John Paul II. Members of Pelikan's family remember him saying that he had not as much converted to Orthodoxy as "returned to it, peeling back the layers of my own belief to reveal the Orthodoxy that was always there". Delighted with this turn of phrase, he used it (or close variants) several times among family and friends, including during a visit to St. Vladimir's for Divine Liturgy, the "last before his death."

Nevertheless, Pelikan was still ecumenical in many ways. Not long before his own death, he praised Pope John Paul II in an article in The New York Times when the pope died in 2005:

It will be a celebration of the legacy of Pope John Paul II and an answer to his prayers (and to those of all Christians, beginning with their Lord himself) if the Eastern and Western churches can produce the necessary mixture of charity and sincere effort to continue to work toward the time when they all may be one.

== Death ==
Pelikan died on May 13, 2006, at his home in Hamden, Connecticut, at the age of 82, seventeen months after being diagnosed with lung cancer. He was interred at Grove Street Cemetery in New Haven, Connecticut, on May 17, 2006. Pelikan was honored by a memorial service in Yale's Battell Chapel on October 10, 2006, with speeches by distinguished scholars and musical performances by cellist Yo-Yo Ma and the Yale Russian Chorus.

== Selected bibliography ==
- From Luther to Kierkegaard: A Study in the History of Theology. St. Louis: Concordia Publishing House
- (ed.) Martin Luther's works (1955–1969) multiple volumes
- LUTHER'S WORKS, Companion Volume, "LUTHER THE EXPOSITOR: Introduction to the Reformer's Exegetical Writings,"(1959) St. Louis: Concordia Publishing House
- The Riddle of Roman Catholicism (1959)
- "The Shape of Death: Life, Death, and Immortality in the Early Fathers (1961) Abingdon Press
- The Light of the World: A Basic Image in Early Christian Thought (1962) Harper and Brothers
- The Finality of Jesus Christ in an Age of Universal History: A Dilemma of the Third Century (1966)
- Development of Christian Doctrine: Some Historical Prolegomena (1969)
- The Christian Tradition: A History of the Development of Doctrine, 5 vols. (1971–1990). Chicago: University of Chicago Press
  - Volume 1: The Emergence of the Catholic Tradition 100–600 (1971) ISBN 0-226-65371-4
  - Volume 2: The Spirit of Eastern Christendom 600–1700 (1974) ISBN 0-226-65373-0
  - Volume 3: The Growth of Medieval Theology 600–1300 (1978) ISBN 0-226-65375-7
  - Volume 4: Reformation of Church and Dogma 1300–1700 (1984) ISBN 0-226-65377-3
  - Volume 5: Christian Doctrine and Modern Culture since 1700 (1990) ISBN 0-226-65380-3
- Jesus Through the Centuries: His Place in the History of Culture (1985) Yale University Press, ISBN 0-300-07987-7
- The Reformation of the Sixteenth Century (Forward) (1985) ISBN 0-8070-1301-3
- Bach Among the Theologians (1986), Philadelphia: Fortress Press, ISBN 0-8006-0792-9
- The Vindication of Tradition: The 1983 Jefferson Lecture in the Humanities (1986) Yale University Press, ISBN 0-300-03638-8.
- Sacred Writings: Buddhism – The Dhammapada (1987) Book of the Month Club, no ISBN
- The Melody of Theology: A Philosophical Dictionary (1988) ISBN 0-674-56472-3
- The Excellent Empire: The Fall of Rome and the Triumph of the Church (1989)
- Imago Dei: The Byzantine Apologia for Icons (1990)
- Confessor Between East and West: A Portrait of Ukrainian Cardinal Josyf Slipyj (1990), ISBN 0-8028-3672-0
- The World Treasury of Modern Religious Thought (1990), editor, hardcover: ISBN 0-316-69770-2, paperback: no ISBN issued
- The Idea of the University: A Reexamination (1992) Yale University Press, ISBN 0-300-05834-9
- Sacred Writings: Hinduism – The Rig Veda (1992) Book of the Month Club, no ISBN
- Sacred Writings: Islam – The Qur'an (1992) editor, Book of the Month Club, no ISBN, in English with Arabic sub-text
- Christianity and Classical Culture: The Metamorphosis of Natural Theology in the Christian Encounter with Hellenism (1993) Gifford lectures at Aberdeen, Yale University Press, ISBN 0-300-06255-9
- Faust the Theologian (1995) Yale University Press, ISBN 0-300-07064-0
- Mary Through the Centuries: Her Place in the History of Culture (1996) Yale University Press, ISBN 0-300-07661-4
- Fools for Christ: Essays on the True, the Good, and the Beautiful (1995) Fortress Press, (2001) Wipf & Stock ISBN 978-1-57910-802-1
- The Illustrated Jesus Through the Centuries (1997) Yale University Press ISBN 0-300-07268-6
- What Has Athens to Do with Jerusalem? Timaeus and Genesis in Counterpoint (1998) Thomas Spencer Jerome Lectures, University of Michigan Press, ISBN 0-472-10807-7
- Divine Rhetoric: The Sermon on the Mount as Message and as Model in Augustine, Chrysostom, and Luther (2000) St. Vladimir's Seminary Press, ISBN 0-88141-214-7
- Credo: Historical and Theological Guide to Creeds and Confessions of Faith in the Christian Tradition (2003) Yale University Press, ISBN 0-300-09388-8
- Interpreting the Bible and the Constitution (2004) Yale University Press ISBN 0-300-10267-4
- Whose Bible Is It? A History of the Scriptures Through the Ages (2005) ISBN 0-670-03385-5
- Mary: Images of the Mother of Jesus in Jewish and Christian Perspective (2005)
- Acts (2005, 2006) Brazos Press, ISBN 1-58743-094-0. A theological Bible commentary

Academic offices
Preceded by Roland Bainton	Titus Street Professor of Ecclesiastical History; 1962–?	Succeeded by
Preceded by Ian Barbour	Gifford Lecturer at the University of Aberdeen; 1992–1993	Succeeded by John W. Rogerson
Cultural offices
Preceded by Emily Vermeule	Jefferson Lecturer; 1983	Succeeded by Sidney Hook
Professional and academic associations
Preceded by Albert C. Outler	President of the American; Society of Church History; 1965	Succeeded by John Van Rohr
Preceded by Leo Beranek	President of the American; Academy of Arts and Sciences; 1994–1997	Succeeded by Daniel C. Tosteson
Awards
Preceded by Leszek Kołakowski	Kluge Prize; 2004; With: Paul Ricœur	Succeeded by John Hope Franklin
Preceded by Leszek Kołakowski	Kluge Prize; 2004; With: Paul Ricœur	Succeeded by Yu Ying-shih
