= Tao Kwok Cheung =

Hong Kong philosophy professor (born 1955)

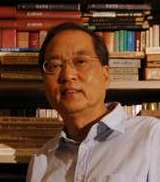
- Born: 1955 (age 70–71); Huizhou, Guangdong, China

Philosophical work
- Notable works: "The Foreignness of Philosophy"《哲學的陌生感》; "The Pursuit of Philosophy"《哲學的追尋》; "The Blindspot of Thinking"《思考的盲點》

Tao Kwok Cheung (Chinese: 陶國璋, born 1955) is a Hong Kong philosophy professor. He was born in Huizhou, Guangdong, and moved to Hong Kong in 1959 at the age of four. He teaches General Education courses in the Chinese University of Hong Kong as a full-time instructor since 1990 and retired in 2015 to be a part-time assistant professor. He founded the Philosophia Cultural Society (睿哲文化學會) with other University lecturers in 2001 and is also a council member of Society for Life and Death Education. He publishes articles in a special column "Philosophy in an array of stars" (繁星哲語]) in the Hong Kong Economic Journal and in Ming Pao.

== Academic background ==
- 1979: Graduated from the Bachelor of Arts in philosophy from Chung Chi College, the Chinese University of Hong Kong, where he mainly studied Western philosophies
- 1981: Graduated from master's degree in the New Asia Institute of Advanced Chinese Studies (新亞研究所), then studied Chinese philosophies as a student of Mou Zongsan
- 1986: Earned his Doctor Degree in Philosophy

== Research interests ==
- Confucian philosophy
- Taoist philosophy
- Neo-Confucian philosophy
- Buddhist philosophy
- History of Chinese philosophy
- Philosophy of Immanuel Kant
- Comparative studies of Chinese and Western philosophies
- Existentialism and the Philosophy of Life
- Metaphysics

== Teaching career ==
- 1986- 1989: Taught in Hong Kong Shue Yan University
- 1990- 1991: Taught in the New Asia Institute of Advanced Chinese Studies (新亞研究所)
- 1991-2015: Taught General Education courses in the Chinese University of Hong Kong, including: Outline of Chinese Culture; Mainstream Chinese Philosophical Thought; Philosophy and Human Life; Death and Immorality; Philosophy of Love; Philosophy, Film and Life; Human Happiness.

Tao is renowned for his witty and humorous teaching style. "Philosophy of Love" and "Death and Immorality" are popular courses among students in the Chinese University of Hong Kong.

=== "Philosophy of Love" ===
"Analyze love in a solemn philosophical way" ("把愛情當做哲學命題進行嚴肅分析") is what Tao aimed to do when he started the course "Philosophy of Love". In philosophy, topics like freedom, death and democracy are widely discussed in depth. Yet, people rarely interpret 'love' in philosophy, probably because philosophers are not experienced in love, and that they like to talk about the love in ethics and morality, but not the love between people. Also, it is difficult for philosophers to analyze “Love” as it cannot be explained by theories or other rather rational methods. Therefore, Tao aspired to fill the vacuum in philosophy by investigating the unexplored topic of love.

=== "Death and Immorality" ===
Though death is much discussed in the field of philosophy, it is not brought up to a great concern in Hong Kong, because 'death' is a traditional Chinese taboo word, where people do not usually mention it in public but keep it as a topic to be discussed in private. Being diagnosed with nephrosis at an early age, Tao particularly sympathizes with the topic of 'death' where he constantly suffers from pain. Since the 1990s, he has been teaching the course “Death and Immorality” and keep modifying it. At first, he attempted to categorize deaths conscientiously, such as chronic disease, suicide, sudden death. Recent years, he switched to a more relaxing and interactive teaching style, in which he would talk about the unfortunate death of male or female protagonists in romantic story, invite masters in Buddhism to share a religious view of death and organize a workshop for students to feel death. Tao has been teaching this course for over twenty years, he concluded his insights about death in a university talk, he said “When people talk about death, it is very easy for them to view it as ‘others’ death, thus neglect its personal meaning. In fact, death is the reflection of humans on their own existence, we should treat it as a memory of life and let it be our motivation to live, it might change your views on the world" ("當人們談論死亡時，往往容易將其視為‘他人之死’，而忽視了對於自我的意義。其實，死亡是人類對存在的自我反省，我們應當把它變成一生的感受，同樣也是一生的促進，這樣一來它也許會改變你對世界的看法。").

== Writing style ==
Tao uses terse and clear language to illustrate complex philosophical theories in both Chinese and Western world to readers, such as metaphysics, phenomenal and neo-Confucianism. Since Tao mainly writes about Philosophical theories, he keeps his language in an objective manner and seldom reveals personal feelings in his works. His works are well-structured and served as introductory books to beginners in Philosophy. For instance, in his most up-to-date book Post-80s·The Blind Spot of Love (《愛的盲點‧80後篇》), incorporated simple ideas in Philosophy, Psychology, and Sociology in analysing the development of mentality in the post-1980s generation. Hence, portrays the phenomenon of love in the post-1980s generation and unlocks their sentimental world.

Though Tao uses plain words, his works are poetic and lively, which challenge the perception that Philosophy is meant to be solemn. In The Foreignness of Philosophy (《哲學的陌生感》), the famous line "Foreignness is the oblivion over a long period of time, they do not know who they are as being long in their bustling real-life. " ("陌生是長時間的遺忘，長期在現實生活中營役而不知其所歸向。") reflects Tao's use of simple yet beautiful Chinese in explaining Phenomenon in Philosophy. "I existed, life in here, it has no beginning or an end, it cannot be depended upon something else, it is the most natural and primitive bounce; it is filled with passion, that needs to be expressed entirely" ("我存在了，生命之在，起迄無端，欲著而無著，是原始自然的躍動；它滿盈激動，總要求發放出來，宣洩無餘。"), gives readers a vivid impression of the excitement in possessing life.

== Publications ==
- "Metaphysical Meaning of Moral Values" (Chinese: 《道德價值的形上意義》), Tao Kwok Cheung, 1981.
- "The Blind Spot of Thinking" (Chinese: 《思考的盲點》), Hong Kong: Chung Hwa Book Co. (H.K.) Ltd., 1993.
- "Exploitation of Accurate Thinking" ( Chinese:《開發精確的思考》), Hong Kong: Chung Hwa Book Co. (H.K.) Ltd., 1994.
- "The Abyss of Life and the Phenomenal World"(Chinese:《生命坎陷與現象世界》), Hong Kong: Chung Hwa Book Co. (H.K.) Ltd., 1994.
- "The Application of Thinking Model in Mou Zongsan's' Phenomenon and das Ding an Sich'" (Chinese:《牟宗三先生《現象與物自身》思維模式之應用》), "Mou Zongsan and Modern Neo-Confucianism International Conference" (Chinese:《牟宗三與當代新儒學國際會議》),1998.
- "Research and Analysis of the Argumentation in Zuangzi's Qi Wu Lun" (Chinese:《莊子齊物論義理演析》), explained by Mou Zongsan, written by Tao Kwok Cheung, Hong Kong: Chung Hwa Book Co. (H.K.) Ltd., 1998.
- "The Foreignness of Philosophy" (Chinese: 《哲學的陌生感》), Hong Kong: Hong Ye Shu Dian, 1999.
- "The Difficulties in Metaphysics” (Chinese: 《形上學的困難》), Ngai Po Monthly, 1999.
- "The Change in Modern Western Metaphysics" (Chinese:《現代西方形上學的轉向》), 1999.
- "The Significance of the Times in Confucianism's 'Mìnɡ' "(Chinese:《儒家言「命」的時代意義》), "Neo-Confucianism Academic Conference" (Chinese:《新儒家學術會議》), New Asia Institute of Advance Chinese Studies, 2001.
- "The Reflection upon the Relation of Self-identity and Death from Nietzsche's Dionysian spirit" (Chinese:《從尼采的酒神精神反思自我同一性與死亡的關係》, "Seminar on Death and the World of Mortals" (Chinese:《死亡與人間研討會》), the University General Education the Chinese University of Hong Kong, 2002.
- “The Pursuit of Philosophy” (Chinese: 《哲學的追尋》), Tao Kwok Cheung, 2004
- “The Estrangement of Philosophy” Revised Edition (Chinese: 《哲學的陌生感》修定版), Hong Kong: Infolink Publishing Ltd., 2007.
- "The Blindspot of Thinking· New Edition" (Chinese:《思考的盲點·新編》, Hong Kong: Infolink Publishing Ltd., 2007.
- “Post-80s·The Blind Spot of Love” (Chinese:《愛的盲點‧80後篇》), Hong Kong: Chung Hwa Book Co. (H.K.) Ltd.,2011.
