= Kant's influence on Mou Zongsan =

Mou Zongsan's study of Immanuel Kant has been cited as a highly crucial part in the development Mou’s personal philosophy, namely New Confucianism. Widely regarded as the most influential Kant scholar in China, Mou's rigorous critique of Kant’s philosophy—having translated all three of Kant’s critiques—served as an attempt to reconcile Chinese and Western philosophy whilst increasing pressure to westernize in China.

Following his teacher Xiong Shili, Mou attempted to justify a moral metaphysics. He attempted to do this in large part by critiquing Kantian concepts such as moral nature, moral feeling, intellectual intuition, thing-in-itself, and the division between noumena and phenomena.

== Moral metaphysics ==
=== Moral nature ===
Mou seeks to establish a moral metaphysics in Kantian terms by attempting to disprove that there can only be a metaphysics of morals. In a moral metaphysics, since ontology and morality are so closely related, humans must have intellectual intuition to see the things they know, including ourselves, to have moral value. Kant was unable to justify a moral law because of the limitedness of human condition, specifically the lack of human intellectual intuition and to postulate free-will as something beyond human grasp. What Kant should have done, according to Mou, was to establish the existence of a free-will and exploring practical consequences further. Accordingly, Mou urges readers to “dismiss Kant’s mistaken approach and follow Confucian terms such as heart-mind, ‘Good knowledge,’ and [regard] intellectual intuition as another term for self-transcendence—a term that is more concerned with connection between human beings that is more fundamental than mere self-identity."

The heart-minds of all humans are all essentially one and this oneness transcends individual particularity. Thus, it seems as though Mou argues for a morality tied to non-individuality: a connection with others that precedes the ground of individual self-identity. In making distinctions between the noumena and phenomena instead of realizing the heart-mind, or trying to prove the existence of free-will instead of accepting its existence, shows that Kant is only concerned with the individual, which denies access to his own morality. Thus Kant missed the impact of self-transforming experience of moral action because of a concept of man that defies self-transcendence.

As Nick Bunin explained, “Kant displaces the moral self, the rational will, the value of things, and the reward for culture to a noumena world that we cannot know. In just the way it is most important to know ourselves and others we are cut off from knowledge. The ‘absolute otherness of the other’ is complemented on this view by the absolute otherness of myself as a moral agent.”

Under Kant’s system Mencius's parable on the child on the well will also fail because of the "lack connection between human beings that is more fundamental to their Selves," and thus be unable to 'truly' experience shock to my Self (自我震動), an awakening to my Self (驚醒) and a self-confirmation of myself (自肯認其自己). As scholar Schmidt wrote, “Since for Mou intellectual intuition is just another name for self-transcendence, we can infer from here what is being transcended in this moment: the atomistic isolation of the individual, which is but an abstraction from every person’s own true moral Self.” On the clinging to self image of the mere individual, Schmidt continued, ”…in Western philosophy, this clinging has been institutionalized in the concept of the (epistemological) subject or Cogito—our self-transcendence and indeed the whole moral dimension of our being remains opaque. We do not reach what New Confucians call awareness of our own moral nature (自覺).”

=== Limitation of Kant’s theory of moral feeling ===
Kant seeks to find a moral law based exclusively on reason and not on feelings because the variability in degrees would make it impossible to determine a uniform moral standard. However, Kant still allows feeling to play a role in his search for a moral law. First, he divides feelings into two categories: (i) pathological feelings and (ii) moral feelings: pathological feelings precede the thought of law while moral feeling can only follow after the thought of the law. Although neither sorts of feelings can stand as grounds for a moral law because it is not based on reason, Kant believed a kind of moral feeling, specifically the ’respect’ for moral feeling to be worthy of further investigation.

For Kant, unlike pathological feelings, ‘respect’ for the law does not arise out of external influence and is “self-wrought by rational concept." However, this respect for the law is not the basis of a moral law, it instead represents “the consciousness that my will is subordinate to a law, without the intervention of other influences on my sense.” For Kant, moral feeling is the incentive (Bewegungsgrund) to follow moral law and should not be undermined. Yet he categorizes this feeling under empirical happiness because “every empirical interest promises to contribute to the well-being by the agreeableness that a thing affords, whether profit be regarded.”

On this matter Mou disagrees with Kant, and believes that by putting moral feeling on par with happiness Kant misses the whole essence of moral feeling entirely. According to Mou, there is not only empirical moral feeling but also transcendental moral feeling, and it is in this form of moral feeling that incentive (Bewegungsgrund) for moral law can be found. On this transcendental moral feeling Mou writes:

"The three—namely, enlightened feeling, reason, and principle—are one. This does not mean to establish in advance a particular kind of moral feeling as the ground of principle—which is [the position] opposed by Kant. Rather, reason itself is enlightened feeling (since it is non-sensible, it is called enlightened feeling, or intellectual feeling). Enlightened feeling is at the same time reason: it does not precede reason, but neither is it posterior to reason; it is identical with reason."

Mou is reticent to assign moral feeling as the basis for moral law, but he introduces a new meaning to moral feeling calling it “the transcendental dynamic ground for the realization of morals.”

== Intellectual intuition ==
Mou claimed in Phenomena and Thing-in-Itself 現象與物自身 (1975) that “if it is true that human beings cannot have intellectual intuition, then the whole of Chinese philosophy must collapse completely, and the thousands years of effort must be in vain. It is just an illusion.” Through his investigation of Kant’s intellectual intuition Mou strives not only to overcome Kant but to establish that Chinese philosophy is superior.

In Kant’s terms, human beings are limited (有限) in that they do not have intellectual intuition (智的直覺) and therefore have no access to the thing-in-itself (物自身). Accordingly Mou is tasked with going beyond Kant, where he claims human beings are limitless(無限)—that they do have intellectual intuition and therefore are indeed able to grasp things-in-themselves. In Kant, things as they are in themselves are not transcendent objects residing in a realm beyond the reach of human reason. The thing in itself is not a thing at all, but a notion that has to be presupposed from the standpoint of (finite) human reason. Therefore, one cannot argue for a particular kind of faculty that provides access to it. By presenting his concept of intellectual ‘intuition’ Mou seems to argue for a faculty that Kant had overlooked or misunderstood, but his whole argument ultimately rests on a change of meaning of what the thing in itself is (see below).

Mou’s motives for holding that human beings have intellectual intuition lies in Confucian thinking of moral transformation and attainment of happiness. The Confucian concept of moral transformation, a process where a small person can transcend himself into a gentlemen and to a sage, rests on the principle that we are able to know our motives and will that allow for such transformation. In contrast, Kant denies that we can have intellectual intuition of things-in-themselves, even of oneself. This is further elucidated in Bunin’s God’s Knowledge and Ours: Kant and Mou Zongsan on Intellectual Intuition:

”[T]he contents of my consciousness are objects of inner sense, but my consciousness is an object of neither inner nor outer sense.If I had intellectual intuition of myself, I would constitute myself as an object without recourse to sensibility, and again the whole Kantian edifice of knowledge (and language) would come crashing down”

For Mou, Kant’s philosophy rests on the assumption of man’s limitedness (人之有限性), and to go beyond this Mou argues although man is limited, these limits can be overcome / he can become limitless (人雖有限而可無限). This recalls not only the Confucian notion of moral transformation but also the attainment of virtue (成德), both of which necessarily require us to be able to know our motives and will as said above.

However, for Mou, it is not a question of why humans can overcome limitedness, but why the West failed to develop this simple human characteristic. Simply put, it was the Western understanding of man as God’s creature, or more so, as a negative reflection of God’s unerring qualities that inherently limited man’s being. Confucian transcendence was not possible because in the West it was labeled as ‘divine’ and something off limits for moral humans. This deeply embedded belief lead to the lack of intellectual intuition in Kant's philosophy. Mou concluded that Kant had played within the confines of Christian dogma with an implication of absolute distinction between man and God, and viewed man as a limited being. For Mou, this is not only a reflection of Kant’s limitedness in his philosophy but of Western philosophy as a whole.

== Things-in-themselves, noumena and phenomena ==
Kant theorized that (1) only God can have knowledge of noumena because he possesses intellectual intuition and (2) God only creates noumena, not appearances. Mou praised this distinction of noumena and phenomena and deemed it to involve one of the most profound metaphysical questions. However, Mou claimed that the problem with the division between noumena and phenomena, especially the negative conception of noumena (the inability to be known by humans) is due to an unclear understanding of thing-in-itself. Further, Mou claimed the distinction can only be understood if the concept of things-in-themselves are understood as evaluative rather than factual.

This maneuver allows for the justification for the existence of things-in-themselves as practical and not as a postulate, and calls for the possibility for moral laws. This is important because the existence of moral laws can only be justified practically in the dimension of practical reason. Practical justification of things-in-themselves have subjective necessity because they are out of this practical necessity—that is, as autonomous, phenomenal beings, how much moral laws matter to us and our propensity to follow them is grounds for the existence of it. Thus, the conception of things-in-themselves that is limited (inaccessible) to us through theoretical reason becomes positive in practical reason.

As Mou says, “much theoretical reason cannot affirm the objective reality of freedom, God, and the soul". Mou arrives this position because Confucian thinking has been dominated by a concern for moral agency (道德行為) and the attainment of virtue (成德) and therefore by practical problems in a sense that the Western tradition has failed to grasp. This can be seen from the absence of the concept of gongfu (工夫) in Western concepts, that is, the individual “moral effort” that realizes moral values through human agency. Scholar Stephen Schmidt writes about gongfu (工夫) saying:

“I suggest to understand gongfu as the dynamic point of contact between the real and the ideal, between Is and Ought, and thus between the domains of ontology and moral theory in Western philosophy. In Confucianism, this point of contact constitutes its own quasi-ontological realm, which is congruent neither with purely objective and factual reality nor with mere ideality, but is instead a kind of actuality (實體)—what comes into being through human agency and constitutes the human life-world with its intrinsic moral quality.”

Wing-Cheuk Chan writes that it is at this juncture that Mou reiterates the need for Confucianism because it grants intellectual intuition to the human being and the noumena becomes accessible.

Giving things-in-themselves a theoretical meaning limits the capacity for humans to know it, but practical reason validates its value and infinitude. Thus, when the human mind becomes infinite in Confucian terms, all beings are given as things-in-themselves. For Mou, the precarious basis of the distinction between noumena and phenomena can be solved through the Confucian perception of man having the ability to transcend himself though moral transformation.

== Criticism ==
Scholars argue that Mou’s translations of Kantian terms are not accurate reflections of the original meanings in German because all of Mou's works were translated from English. Stephan Schmidt, for example, notes the term Anschauung, rendered in English as intuition as a misleading translation because anschauung (note the root word anschauen, which means “to look”) relies on visual sense and the eye as the organ for human knowledge, whereas intuition does not necessarily involve the eye. Following the English translation Mou translates it into Chinese as zhijue (直覺) or “direct perception," thereby directly attributing the activity to the intellect. The defining meanings of Kant’s terms are hence erased and replaced with Mou’s terms containing implicit interpretations of what Kant originally meant.
