= New Asia Middle School =

Secondary school in Hong Kong

- 新亞中學

Location
- 6 Farm Road, Kowloon; Hong Kong
- Coordinates: 22.3208°N 114.1862°E

Information
- Type: Aided
- Motto: Sincerity and intelligence (Chinese: 誠明)
- Established: 28 September 1973
- School district: Kowloon City District
- Principal: Leung Suk-ching
- Faculty: 58
- Grades: Form 1 to Form 6
- Gender: Co-educational
- Enrollment: around 600
- Average class size: 25
- Language: Chinese and English
- Campus size: about 13,000 m^{2} (140,000 sq ft)
- Houses: Plentiful (Chinese: 博); Literary (Chinese: 文); Moderate (Chinese: 約); Politeness (Chinese: 禮)
- Colors: blue, white, azure
- Publication: 春泥, 農圃
- Affiliation: New Asia Educational Cultural Association
- Website: www.nams.edu.hk

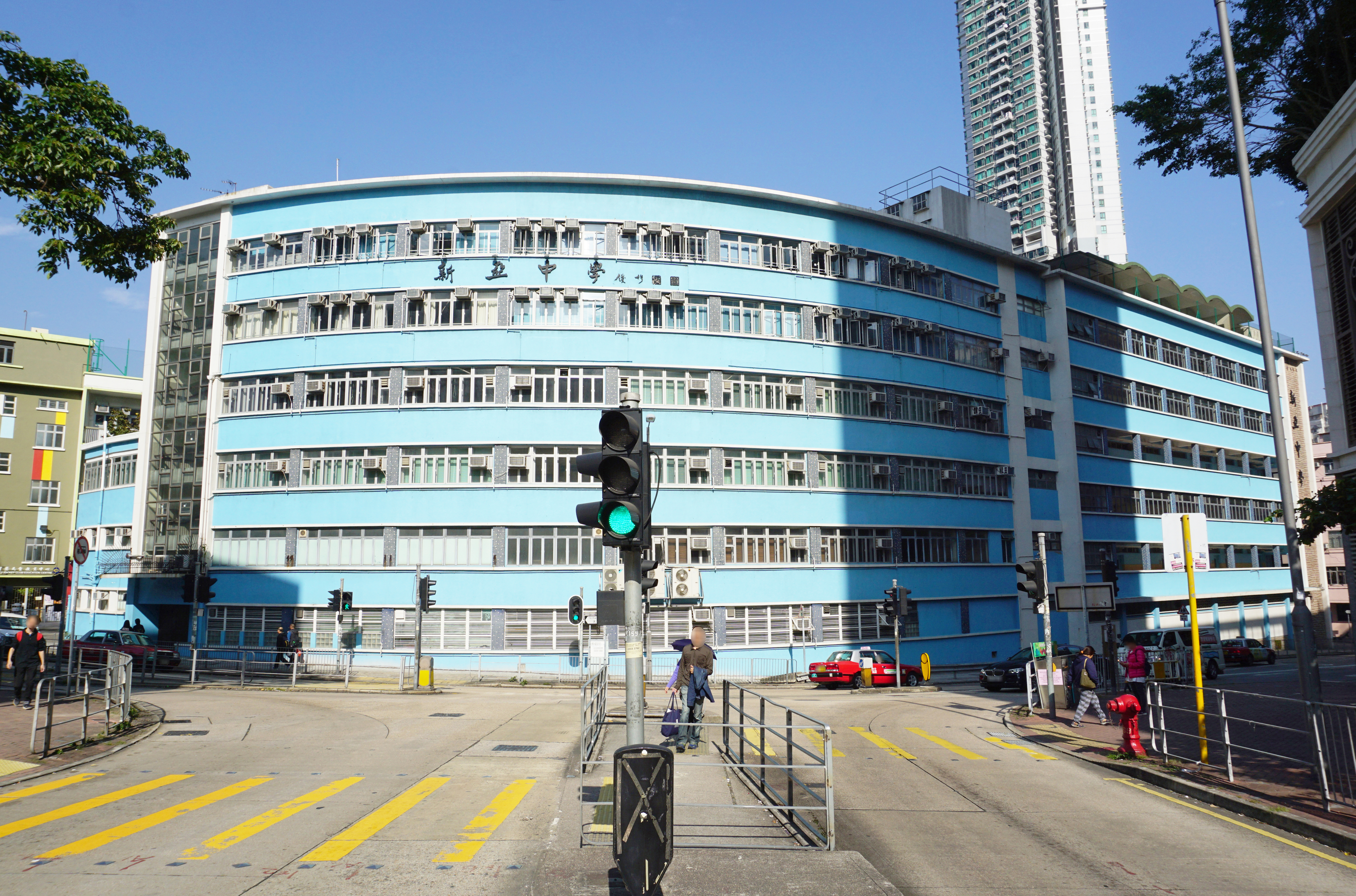
Southwest of the school (as seen from Sheung Shing Street)

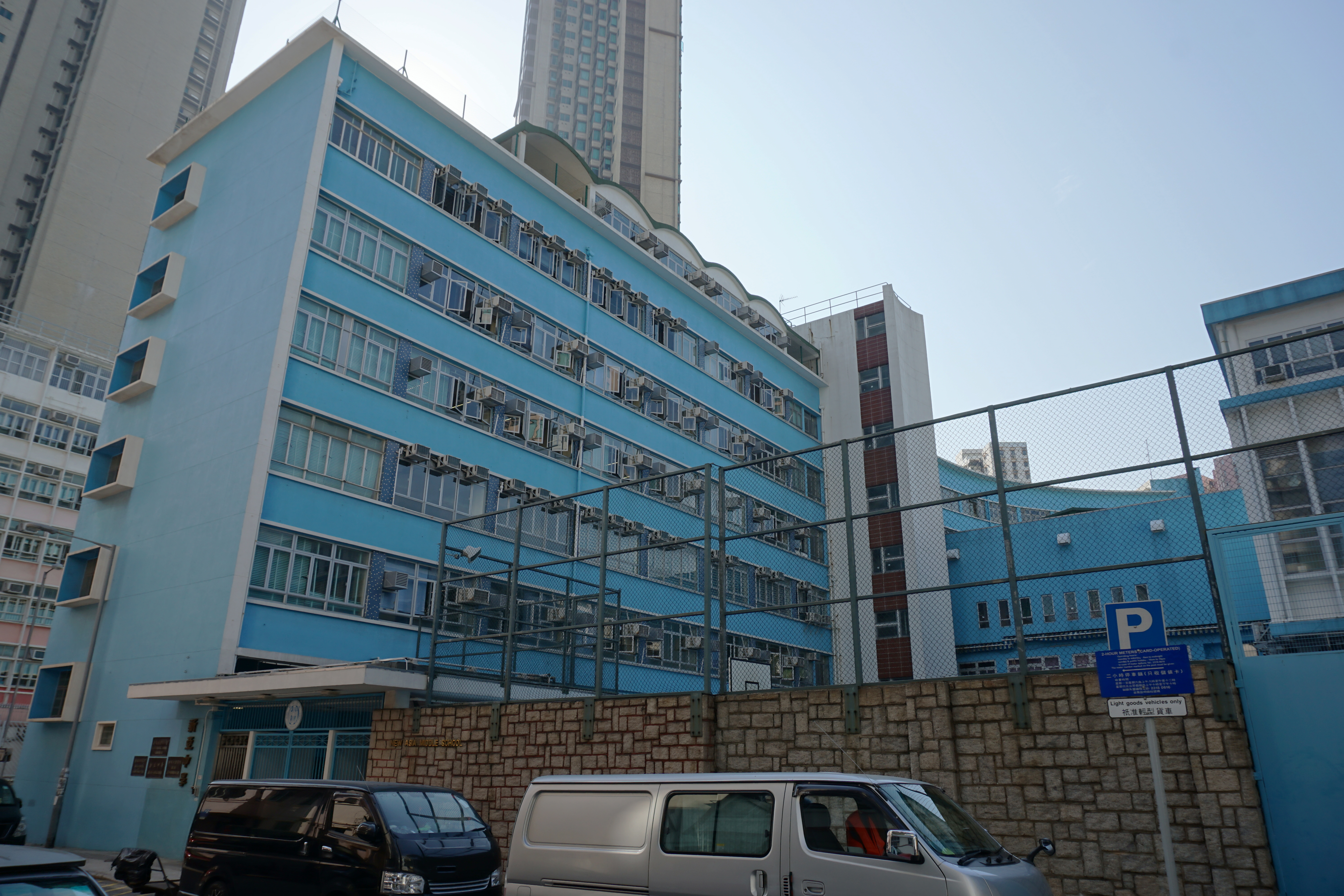
Southeast of the school and the main entrance (bottom left)

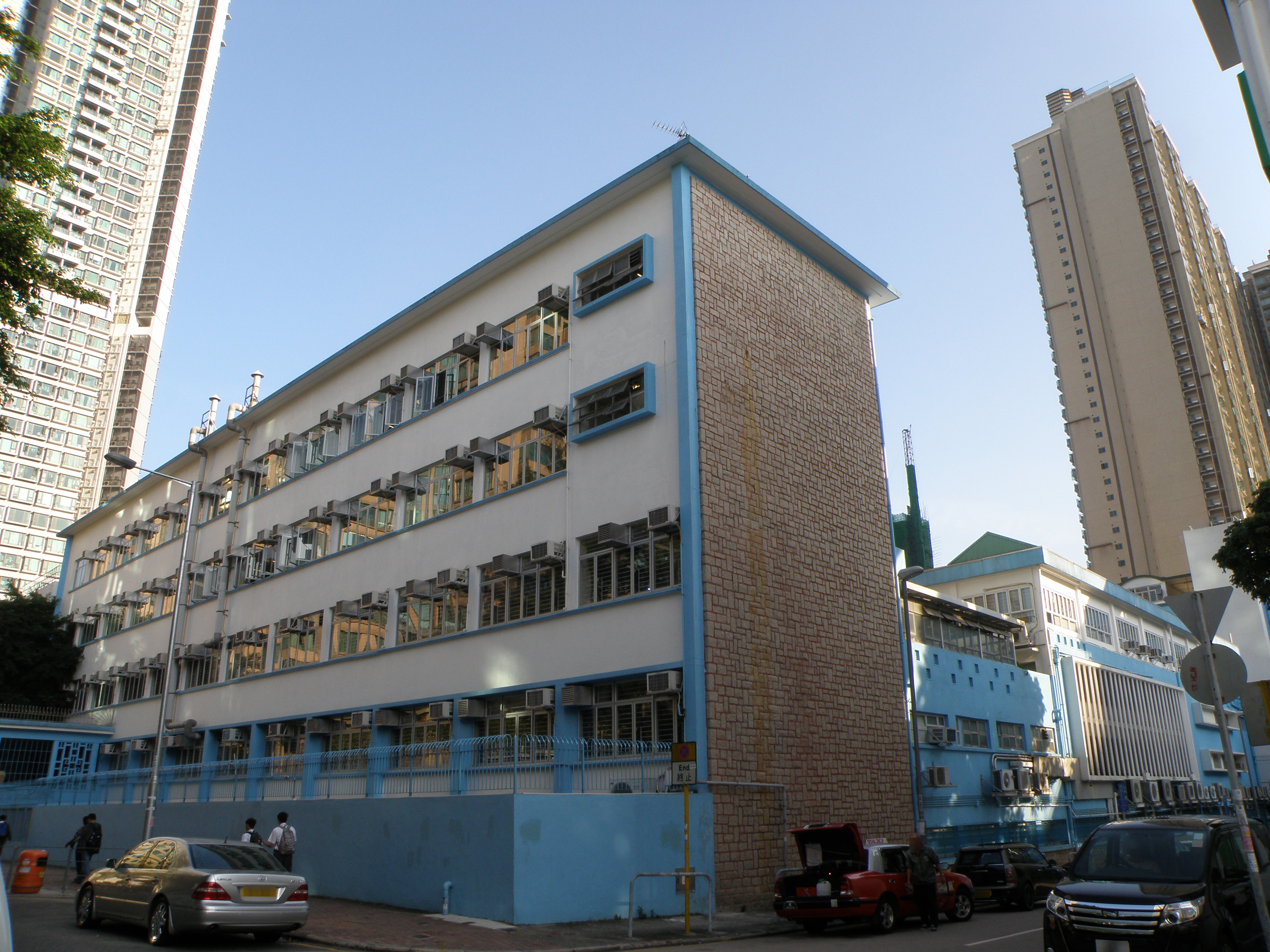
Northwest of the school (at Farm Road)

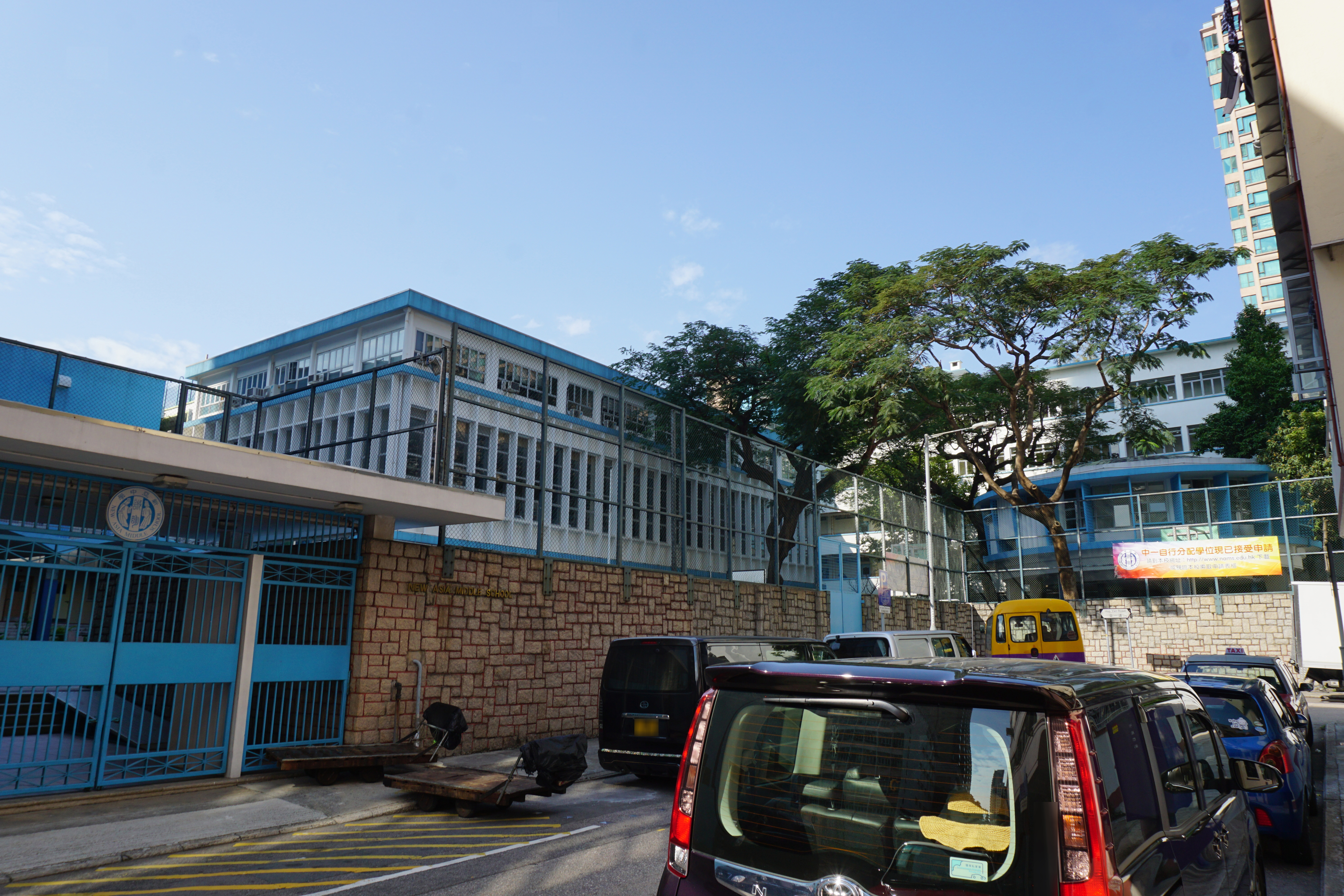
Northeast of the school

New Asia Middle School (Chinese: 新亞中學; Jyutping: san1 aa3 zung1 hok6), abbreviated as NAMS, is an aided secondary school in Hong Kong, founded in 1973 by Ch'ien Mu as a non-profit Chinese secondary school. The school sits on the former campus of New Asia College – on Farm Road, Kau Pui Lung, Kowloon – , made available when the college became a member of The Chinese University of Hong Kong and moved to Ma Liu Shui in Sha Tin.

The spirit of the school is to promote Chinese culture, revive Chinese ethics, and cultivate the New Asian qualities of students. The school uses Chinese as the main medium of instruction, offering four classes each from Form 1 to Form 6. Scholars Tang Chun-i and Yu Ying-shih, known for their Confucian values and scholarship, were members of the founding board in the 1970s.

== School administration ==
The founder of the school was Ch'ien Mu. After retirement as university sinologists, Mou Zongsan and Xu Fuguan helped found the school. The school is sponsored by New Asia Educational Cultural Association. In 2007, the IMC was established in accordance with the Hong Kong Education Ordinance to promote the effective development of school administration.

Members of the school board

In the 1970s, the members of the school board included Yu Ying-shih, Sun Guo-dong (孫國棟) and Tang Chun-i. Most members were historians or philosophers. Heung Shu-ai (香樹輝), a famous banker in Hong Kong, became one of the managers of the school.

Supervisors

Wat Kai-chau (屈啟秋) has served as supervisor.

Principals

1st term principal	2nd term principal	3rd term principal	4th term principal	5th term principal
Shu Tou	Lau Wun-ying	Wat Kai-chau	Wong Wai-ting	Leung Suk-ching
1973–1993	1993–2001	2001–2010	2010–2019	2019–present

Vice principals

Vice principals (1st row: external affairs, 2nd row: internal affairs)
Sham Koo-ming → Leung Shuk-ching → Cynthia Lee
Wong Wah-jim → Wong Wai-ting → Cheng Kwok-fu → Chuck Kwai-ying

== Campus environment ==
Its campus consists of four complexes: Block A with a library and the New Asia Institute inside, Block B, Block C and Block S (the Pillar).

== See also ==
- New Asia College
- Education in Hong Kong
- List of secondary schools in Hong Kong
