= Yu Ying-shih =

Chinese-born American historian (1930–2021)

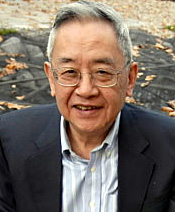
- Born: 22 January 1930; Tianjin, China
- Died: 1 August 2021 (aged 91); Princeton, New Jersey, U.S.
- Relatives: Paul Yu (younger brother); Chen Hsueh-ping (Father-in-law)
- Awards: Kluge Prize (2006); Tang Prize (2014)

Academic background
- Education: Yenching University; New Asia College; Harvard University (PhD)
- Thesis: Views of life and death in later Han China a.D. 25–220 (1962)
- Doctoral advisor: Yang Lien-sheng
- Influences: Ch'ien Mu

Academic work
- Institutions: University of Michigan; Harvard University; New Asia College; Yale University; Princeton University; Chinese University of Hong Kong
- Doctoral students: Ray Huang

Yu Ying-shih
- Traditional Chinese: 余英時
- Simplified Chinese: 余英时
Transcriptions
Standard Mandarin
- Hanyu Pinyin: Yú Yīngshí
- Wade–Giles: Yü^{2} Ying^{1}-shih^{2}
- IPA: [y̌ íŋʂɨ̌]

Yu Ying-shih (Chinese: 余英時; 22 January 1930 – 1 August 2021) was a Chinese-born American historian, sinologist, and the Gordon Wu '58 Professor of Chinese Studies, Emeritus, at Princeton University. He was known for his mastery of sources for Chinese history and philosophy, his ability to synthesize them on a wide range of topics, and for his advocacy for a new Confucianism. He was a tenured professor at Harvard University and Yale University before his time at Princeton.

He was the elder brother of philosopher, educator, and university president Paul Yu.

== Early life ==
Yu's father, who had studied at Harvard, taught history in Tianjin, and at the start of the second Sino-Japanese War sent him to live with his aunt from 1937 through 1946 in rural Anhui province, where they would be safe from Japanese invasion. He later recalled that "although rujia 儒家 [Confucian] culture was in a degenerate state, it nevertheless controlled the activities of daily life: by and large, all interpersonal relationships—from marriage and funeral customs to seasonal festivals—adhered to the rujia norms, supplemented by Buddhist and Daoist beliefs and practices." Wartime shortages meant that sometimes the family had no money for rice, forcing them to eat potatoes. "I hate potatoes," he later told an interviewer. The situation was too chaotic for him to attend school, so he read whatever material he could find, for instance, his aunt's popular novels.

== Academic career ==
In 1949, he enrolled in Yenching University, but shortly came to Hong Kong for reunion with his family. He then studied in the newly founded New Asia College, later incorporated into Chinese University of Hong Kong. The founders of New Asia College, which Yu joined as a student, were staunchly anti-Communist, rejected the iconoclastic New Culture Movement but did not see Western liberal thought as the alternative. Yu studied with Ch'ien Mu, a scholar rooted in traditional Chinese philosophy, and became the first graduate of the college.

Yu came to Harvard University in the United States to pursue his PhD in Chinese history. He then taught at various universities including University of Michigan, Harvard, Yale University and Princeton University. As Yale historian Jonathan Spence commented, Yu is one of the few people to have been tenured at these three Ivy League universities. In 1973, he went back to his alma mater, New Asia College, as its Head of college and also the Pro Vice-Chancellor of University for two years, before returning to Harvard. In 1977, he moved to Yale to take up the position of Charles Seymour Professor in Chinese History. He then moved to Princeton in 1987 to be Professor of East Asian Studies until his retirement.

In 1974, he was elected as a Fellow at Academia Sinica, and has kept this position until his death. In the 1970s, he became one of the members of the school board of New Asia Middle School. When asked later why he had moved to Princeton he said: "They had a really interesting library", probably meaning the East Asian Library and the Gest Collection. He retired from Princeton in 2001.

He died at his home in Princeton, New Jersey during his sleep on 1 August 2021.

== Writing ==
While still in Hong Kong, Yu started to write books and pamphlets in Chinese commenting on the problems of intellectuals and democracy in the People's Republic. He was particularly tenacious over the years in presenting the achievements of Chen Yinke (1890–1969), the greatest modern scholar of Tang dynasty China, who was at first supported and then hounded to death by the revolution. Yu was moved to study Chen upon encountering Chen's draft work "On Love in Two Lives" at the Harvard-Yenching Library. In 1983, Yu published his polemical essay, On the Scholarly Spirit and the Late State of Mind of Chen Yinke. Yu contended that Chen's shift from history to poetry had profound moral and political implications.

His Harvard PhD thesis was published as Trade and Expansion in Han China; a Study in the Structure of Sino-Barbarian Economic Relations (Berkeley: University of California Press, 1967). Scrupulous and thematically relevant monographs, mostly published in Chinese, explored the role of intellectuals, especially early modern moral and political critics such as Fang Yizhi (1611–71), Dai Zhen (1723–77), and Zhang Xuecheng (1738–1801), who had been neglected in earlier scholarship. Yu also mastered the scholarship around Honglou Meng, the novel known in English as Dream of the Red Chamber, a masterpiece exploring the decline of a rich family at the height of the Qing empire in the late 18th century.

The insistent, modest, meticulous voice of history which Yu developed in these studies was the one he used in the debates over democracy in the 1980s and 1990s. Some people, including both the defenders of the state in Beijing and western modernization liberals, still insisted that democracy and Confucianism were incompatible. But Yu developed the philosophical and historical arguments perhaps implicit in the thought of his mentors: liberal Confucian values, once freed from the imperial ideology of the dynasties, are essential to democracy: The independent spirit of the scholar both models and creates responsible criticism of politics. Confucian values had always insisted on the critique of political power, moral judgment grounded in historic comparison, the voice of the people in governance, the contingent nature of the political mandate, public discourse, the responsibility of the individual for social action, and could even be developed for a contemporary view of women's rights.

Yu developed a critical view of the revival of Confucianism in mainland China. He commented "the Chinese Communists are not Confucianists." He held that there were two kinds of Confucianism to be found in China's history: "the Confucianism that had been persecuted, the other is the Confucianism that has persecuted people." He termed the state sponsorship of Confucianism in China today "the kiss of death."

In October 2014 it was reported that Beijing had ordered the banning of works by Yu Yingshi.

Yu gave a televised speech on 22 November 2019 in which he said that some Taiwan media act as the mouthpiece of the PRC in Taiwan.

== Prizes and honors ==
Yu Ying-shih was elected to the American Philosophical Society in 2004. On 15 November 2006, he was named the third recipient of the John W. Kluge Prize for lifetime achievement in the study of humanity. He shared the 2006 prize with John Hope Franklin. He is the inaugural winner of the Tang Prize in Sinology, which recognizes scholars conducting "revolutionary research" and is selected by the Academia Sinica. Yu used his Tang Prize winnings of NT$10 million to establish the Yu Ying-shih Fellowship for the Humanities. Asteroid 28966 Yuyingshih, discovered by Bill Yeung in 2001, was named in his honor. The official naming citation was published by the Minor Planet Center on 6 April 2019 (M.P.C. 112430).

Yu received honorary doctorate in arts from the University of Hong Kong in 1992 and honorary doctorate in law from the Chinese University of Hong Kong in 1977.

To honour his contribution to sinology, New Asia College and Chung Chi College have set up the series "Yu Ying-shih Lecture in History" in 2007 to invite distinguished scholars to speak about Chinese history.

== Major works ==
- Yu Ying-shih WorldCat.
- Yü, Ying-shih (1967). Trade and Expansion in Han China: A Study in the Structure of Sino-Barbarian Economic Relations. University of California Press. LCCN 67-12492. OCLC 651358801.
- —— (1981). Early Chinese History in the People's Republic of China : The Report of the Han Dynasty Studies Delegation, October-November 1978. Seattle: School of International Studies, University of Washington.
- —— (1974). "The Two Worlds of 'Hung-Lou Meng'". Renditions. 2 (Spring): 5–21.
- —— (1993). "The Radicalization of China in the Twentieth Century". Daedalus: 125–150.
- —— (2001), "Neither Renaissance nor Enlightenment: A Historian's Reflections on the May Fourth Movement", in Doleželová-Velingerová, Milena (ed.), The Appropriation of Cultural Capital: China's May Fourth Project, Cambridge, MA: Harvard University Press, pp. 299–320
- —— (2004). Yu Yingshi Wenji 余英时文集. Guilin: Guangxi shifan daxue chubanshe.:

- Vol 1 史學、史家與時代 (history, historians and their times)
- Vol 2 中國思想傳統及其現代變遷 (Traditional Chinese Thought and its present day transformation)
- Vol 3 儒家倫理與商人精神 (Confucian ethic and the spirit of capitalism)
- Vol 4 中國知識人之史的考察 (Chinese intellectuals and their historical investigations)
- Vol 5 現代學人與學術 (Modern scholars and scholarship)
- Vol 6 民主制度與近代文明 (Democracy and modern civilization)
- Vol 7 文化評論與中國情懷（上） (Cultural critique Pt I)
- Vol 8 文化評論與中國情懷（下） (Cultural critiques Pt II)
- Vol 9 歷史人物考辨 (Historical textual studies)
- Vol 10 宋明理學與政治文化 (Studies in Song and Ming Lixue and political culture)

- —— (2016), Chinese History and Culture, with the editorial assistance of Josephine Chiu-Duke, and Michael S. Duke, New York: Columbia University Press, ISBN 9780231178587. Volume 1 (2016). Sixth century B.C.E. to seventeenth century. Volume 2 (2017) Seventeenth century through twentieth century.
- —— (2021), The Religious Ethic and Mercantile Spirit in Early Modern China, translated by Yim-tze Kwong, Columbia University Press, ISBN 9780231200431
- —— (2021), From Rural China to the Ivy League: Reminiscences of Transformations in Modern Chinese History, translated by Josephine Chiu-Duke and Michael S. Duke, Cambria Press, ISBN 9781621966968
