= Mou Tsung-san =

Chinese philosopher and translator

Mou Zongsan
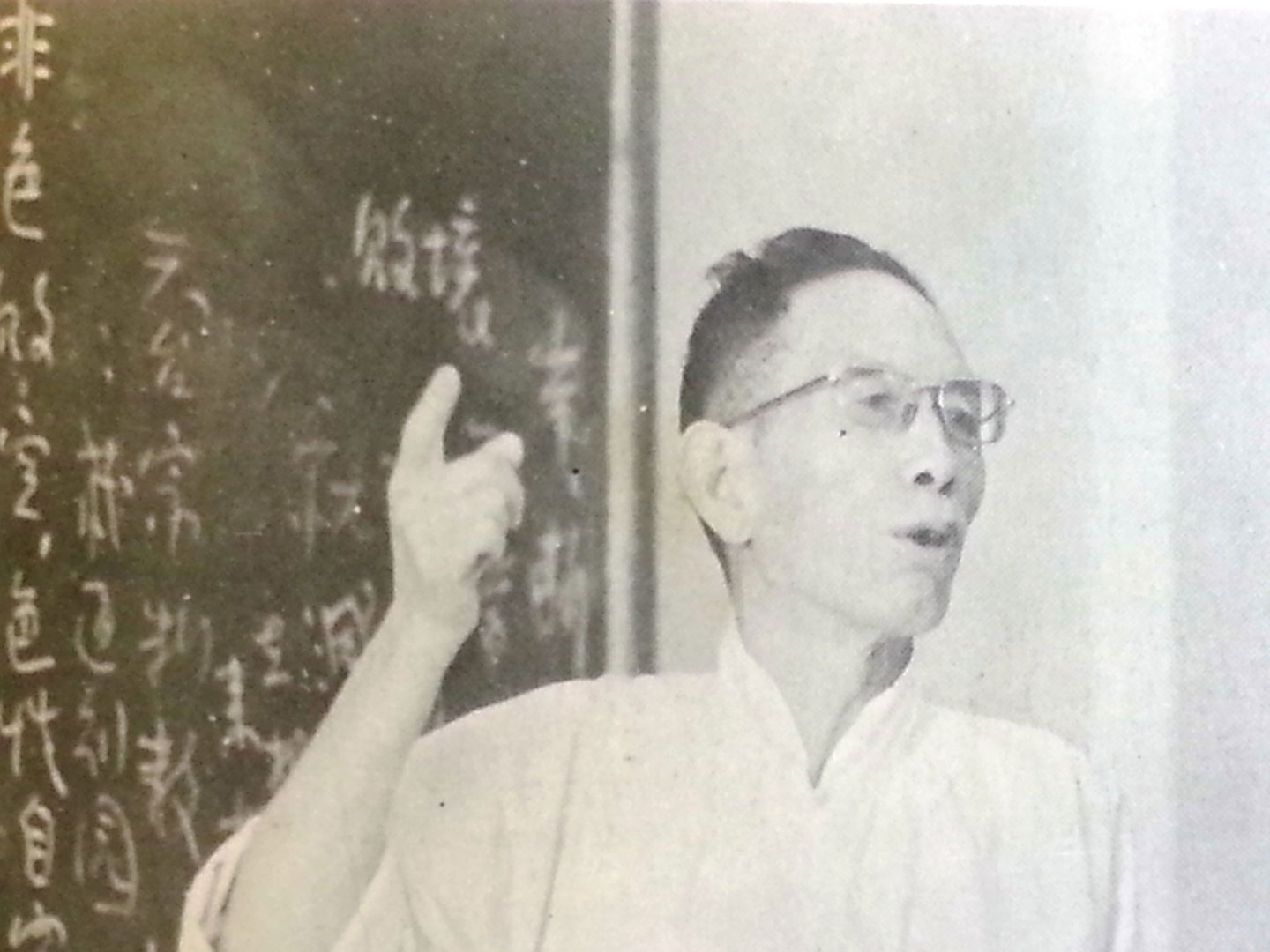
- Mou teaching in Hong Kong in the 1960s
- Born: 12 June 1909; Shandong, Qing China
- Died: 12 April 1995 (aged 85); Taipei, Taiwan

Education
- Education: Peking University

Philosophical work
- Era: 20th-century philosophy
- Region: Chinese philosophy
- School: New Confucianism
- Institutions: New Asia College
- Main interests: History of Chinese philosophy
- Notable ideas: Interpretation of Immanuel Kant's thought

Mou Zongsan (Chinese: 牟宗三; pinyin: Móu Zōngsān; Wade–Giles: Mou Tsung-san; 12 June 1909 – 12 April 1995) was a Chinese philosopher and translator. He was born in Shandong province and graduated from Peking University. In 1949 he moved to Taiwan, and later Hong Kong, remaining outside of mainland China for the rest of his life. His thought was heavily influenced by Immanuel Kant, whose three Critiques he translated from English, possibly first, into Chinese, and above all by Tiantai Buddhist philosophy.

Over the last 40 years of his life, Mou wrote histories of "Neo-Daoist," Confucian, and Buddhist philosophy (totaling six volumes) a group of constructive philosophic treatises, culminating in his 1985 work, On the Summum Bonum (Chinese: 圓善論; pinyin: yuanshan lun), in which he attempts to rectify the problems in Kant's system through a Confucian-based philosophy reworked with a set of concepts appropriated from Tiantai Buddhism.

In the People's Republic of China, Mou is especially famous for his cultural traditionalism and his defense of democracy as a traditional Chinese value.

== Biography ==
Mou Zongsan was born into the family of an innkeeper in Qixia, Shandong. He went to Peking University for college prep (1927) and undergraduate courses (1929). During that time he became a follower of Xiong Shili, author of the New Treatise on Consciousness-only and soon to be the most eminent philosopher in China until supplanted by Mou himself. After graduating in 1933, Mou moved around the country working as a secondary school teacher and a faculty member at different universities. In 1949 he followed the Nationalist government to Taiwan. His student at Tunghai University was Tu Weiming. In 1960 he moved to Hong Kong and eventually took up a post at New Asia College in Hong Kong (now part of the Chinese University of Hong Kong) and helped found New Asia Middle School. During the last two decades of his life Mou was something of an intellectual celebrity. He lectured frequently on Confucian, Buddhist, Daoist, and Kantian philosophy at Hong Kong University, National Taiwan Normal University, and National Taiwan University. He died in Taipei in 1995, leaving dozens of disciples in top academic jobs in Taiwan and Hong Kong.

== Works ==
Mou's complete works contains more than 30 volumes written over about 60 years. In religious studies and philosophy programs, attention is paid mostly to his production in his last 30 years. These can be divided into histories of Chinese philosophy and philosophic treatises.

=== Histories of philosophy ===
Physical Nature and Speculative Reason 才性與玄理 (1963). This is Mou's main treatise on "Neo-Daoism" or xuanxue 玄學. It is an analysis of intellectual developments of the Wei-Jin dynasties (220-420 CE), said to set the agenda for much of later Chinese philosophy and anticipate the developments in Buddhist philosophy later understood by Mou as a pattern underlying the main line of Song-Ming Confucianism.

Substance of Mind and Substance of Human Nature 心體與性體 (1968–1969). This is probably the most studied of Mou's books, and by far the most famous in the West. It is a three volume history of Confucianism in the Song (960-1279) and Ming (1368-1644) dynasties, often called "Neo-Confucianism" in the West. It challenges usual two-part division of Neo-Confucian thought into a "school of principle" (lixue 理學), the Cheng-Zhu school represented by Cheng Yi, Cheng Hao, and Zhu Xi, and a "school of mind" (xinxue 心學) or Lu-Wang school represented by Lu Xiangshan and Wang Yangming. Mou identifies a third lineage, whose main figures are Hu Hong (Hu Wufeng) and Liu Zongzhou (Liu Jishan), which best conveys the basic message of the classical sage Mencius. Mou's later book From Lu Xiangshan to Liu Jishan (從陸象山到劉蕺山) (1979) is treated as the fourth volume of this book.

Buddha-Nature and Prajna 佛性與般若 (1977). This is Mou's main examination of Buddhist philosophy, written in two volumes. It upends the usual Chinese recognition of the Huayan school as the most well-developed form of Buddhism and puts the Tiantai school in first place. Mou credits Tiantai with having the best concepts for understanding the authoritative Hong-Liu line of Confucianism.

=== Philosophical treatises ===
Intellectual Intuition and Chinese Philosophy 智的直覺與中國哲學 (1971). In this treatise, Mou applies the Kantian idea of 'intellectual intuition' to Chinese philosophy, which he believes affirms the idea that human beings can have such awareness. He expresses strong interest in the utility of Buddhist philosophy for Confucian purposes. This book is often thought of as an early version of Phenomenon and Thing-in-Itself.

Phenomenon and Thing-in-Itself 現象與物自身 (1975). This develops Mou's famous doctrine of "two-level ontology," patterned off of Kantian and Buddhist metaphysics.

Treatise on Summum Bonum (圓善論) (1985). This is Mou's last major work. Mou did not intend it as his final book, but scholars generally treat it as the definitive summary of his thinking. It attempts to use Tiantai ontological concepts as inspiration to find Confucian solution to Kant's problem of the highest good or summum bonum. It includes a chapter with Mou's commentary on Mencius and a more complete evaluation of the place of Daoist and Buddhist philosophy for the modern Confucian.

== Philosophical work ==
=== Mou and Kant ===
Following his teacher Xiong Shili, Mou Zongsan sought to articulate and justify a moral metaphysics. A moral metaphysics asserts the interconnectedness of ontology and morality, implying the moral value of all objects including the self. Mou's philosophy attempts to demonstrate the limits of Kant, suggesting instead the ways in which Chinese thought may surpass Kantian morality. Several of Mou's titles directly reveal his engagement with Kant – Intellectual Intuition and Chinese Philosophy, Phenomenon and Thing-in-Itself, and Treatise of the Perfect Good – a commitment that is reflected in Mou's decision to express his philosophy in Kantian terms. For example, Mou's philosophy inherits the Kantian concepts of autonomy, intellectual intuition, and Thing-in-Itself, although Confucianism inspires Mou to transform these concepts. The reason behind this decision to use Kantian terms remains unknown, but some scholars argue that Mou's use of certain terminologies aims to facilitate a dialogue between the East and West, pointing to Mou's comparison of Mencius and Kant, whereby he demonstrates the compatibility of Chinese and Western philosophies.

Mou's philosophy develops as a critique and transformation of Kant's critical philosophy. Mou believes in the compatibility of Chinese thought and Kantian philosophy because both are backed by the Way, where the Way is essentially truth and different philosophies manifest different aspects it. Mou's analysis of Kant centers on Kant's Critique of Pure Reason. One of Mou's major criticisms of Kant involves Kant's regard for free will as theoretical. Herein lies one of Mou's fundamental beliefs, that morality and the moral life are, contrary to what Kant posits, really real. This presumption stems from Mou's belief in the metaphysical necessity of the capability of improving one's moral praxis, and thus Mou develops a moral metaphysics within the tenet of subjectivism. While Kant believes that intellectual intuition is only possible for God, Mou ascribes human beings equal capability of this intuition, which Mou finds superior to Heidegger’s fundamental ontology. Mou rejects Heidegger because according to Kant, true metaphysics is transcendent. Mou further departs from Kant’s philosophy, eventually transforming it into what is commonly referred to as New Confucianism or Mind Confucianism.

=== Mou and Heidegger ===
==== Mou's relation to Heidegger ====
Mou Zongsan’s interest in Martin Heidegger’s philosophy arises from his critique and transformation of Kant's philosophy. Mou's interpretation of Kant is greatly influenced by Heidegger’s elaboration of Kant's Critique of Pure Reason in his books Kant and the Problem of Metaphysics (Kantbuch) and Introduction to Metaphysics. Under the influence of Heidegger’s philosophy, Mou changed his interpretation of Kant’s first critique from an epistemological approach to an ontological approach. In his treatise Intellectual Intuition and Chinese Philosophy (zhi de zhexue yu zhongguo zhexue) 智的直覺與中國哲學 (1971), Mou not only wrote his reflection on Heidegger’s philosophy (and translated two chapters from Being and Time), but also criticized Heidegger’s fundamental ontology with his moral metaphysics. In fact, Mou may have been influenced by Heidegger even in his early major work Substance of Mind and Substance of Human Nature (xinti yu xingti) 心體與性體 (1968–1969). Mou’s argument of the “Three modes” of Neo-Confucianism may be inspired by Heidegger's “Three ontological difference”, which was introduced to Mou from Max Müller’s works.

Mou Zongsan agrees to a certain extent with Heidegger’s interpretation of Kant. Mou introduces a two-layer structure of understanding of the transcendental determination of the Kantian categories: a “logical” layer of understanding and an “ontological” layer of understanding. Mou believes the Kantian thesis that “objectivity is subjectivity” is not an “ontical proposition” but rather an “ontological proposition”. He agrees with Heidegger's analysis of Transcendental Schematism, which indicates that the meaning of objectification presupposes a subjective horizon that enables the object to appear. Mou names the ontology of the phenomenal world as “attached ontology” (zhi de cunyoulun). Mou rejects Kant's declaration that human beings are incapable of producing any intuitive knowledge of thing-in-itself. He embraces Heidegger's affirmation of the “subjective” character of the Kantian transcendental distinction, which he learns from Kantbuch:

The distinction between the concept of thing in itself and that of appearance is not objective but merely subjective.The thing in itself is not another but another aspect (respectus) of the representation with regard to the same object.

==== Mou's critique ====
In general, Mou holds a critical attitude towards Heidegger's fundamental ontology in his treatise Intellectual Intuition and Chinese Philosophy:

Heidegger’s descriptions could let us think of a disclosure of a “true mind” (zhen xin) for instance when he speaks about “call of consciousness”(Ruf, liangxin de huhuan), feeling of guilt ( jiuze zhi gan), dread (Sorge, jiaolü), determined being (Entschlossenheit, jueduan) or nothingness (Nichtigkeit, xuwu). Nevertheless, all these descriptions are still “floating” and he has not been able to pave the way for a “true mind.”

According to Mou, Heidegger's descriptions are “floating” because Heidegger's thought does not recognize any transcendental reality (chaoyue de shiti) but focus on the immanent metaphysics (neizai xingershangxue) to develop his fundamental ontology. “True metaphysics” is “transcendent.” In the eyes of Mou Zongsan, since the immanent metaphysics merely focuses on the problem of the meaning of phenomenal beings, it fails to deal with Kant's transcendental concepts of freedom, immortality, and God. Mou also thinks Heidegger's philosophy is too heroic and romantic and thereby fails to maintain an inherent calmness to approach to “true mind.” Besides, Mou disagrees with Heidegger's “value-free,” and in particular, “morally-neutral” approach. The lack of moral awareness indicates that Heidegger's fundamental ontology does not reach the realm of moral metaphysics, but merely offers an empty and inauthentic answer to the subject.

In short, Mou considers Heidegger only as a “commentator” or “usurper” of Kant. According to Mou, the reason why Heidegger's fundamental ontology fails to reach the realm of moral metaphysics is that Heidegger sticks to the Kantian thesis of the finitude of human being and fails to recognize the intellectual intuition (zhi de zhijue) of human beings. Mou claims that although the study of Kant's philosophy helps him understand the relation between phenomenal world and metaphysical ontology, it is his teacher Xiong Shili who makes him realize the fundamental union of the two via the intellectual intuition. The idea of intellectual intuition is widely manifested in Confucianism, Neo-Confucianism, Daoism and Buddhism, especially in the thought of Wang Yangming, who assimilates moral learning with the course of action such as archery and calligraphy. According to Mou, intellectual intuition is not the central concept of a highly complex speculative system, but a form of knowledge acquired through our deeds (including emotions and intentions).

==== Mou's "misplacement" ====
Some scholars argue that Mou Zongsan's critique of Heidegger's fundamental ontology actually “misplaces (wuzhi)” Heidegger's transcendental metaphysics. It turns out that Mou may agree with Heidegger more than he believes. Heidegger's discussions of Being actually achieve a similar metaphysical level with Mou's discussions of transcendental concepts, such as God, freedom, ren or Dao. Instead of being “floating”, Heidegger's fundamental ontology finds its root in the “transcendent metaphysics” in Being. Far away from “a way of being” in immanent metaphysics, Heidegger's Being actually serves as an ontological basis for beings in phenomenal world. Moreover, in Heidegger's theory, the unveiledness of the Being of beings (“beings” encompass the phenomenal world) is inseparable from the practical and ethical reason. This echoes with Mous’ belief in unifying phenomenal world with metaphysical ontology through the intellectual intuition. They also share a similar interpretation of the “knowledge”. Mou believes moral learning can pave a way to moral metaphysics, while Heidegger also believes that we can open ourselves to the Being in our daily lives.

Mou's “misplacement” of Heidegger's transcendental metaphysics may arise from his misconception of Heidegger's Time (Zeit, shijian). Heidegger's concept of Time is different from the time as a priori knowledge for Kant, which is actually the temporality (Zeitlichkeit, shijian xing) of Dasein (the experience of being that is peculiar to human beings). Heidegger's Time serves not only as the fundamental character for Being, but also as the fundamental unveiledness of Being. Mou confuses Heidegger's Time (Zeit, shijian) with temporality (Zeitlichkeit, shijian xing) and thereby fails to see the transcendental nature in neither Time nor Being. The different understanding of the concept Time further causes Mou's disagreement with Heidegger's discussions of finitude of human beings. In fact, Heidegger's discussions of finitude are based on his interpretation of the temporality of Dasein. It is not the rejection of the transcendental ontology. Mou fails to recognize that Heidegger's Time represents the transcendental metaphysics that overcome the normal sense of time in phenomenal world. This failure limits Mou's understanding of Heidegger's philosophy only as the immanent metaphysics that stick to the attached (phenomenal) ontology.

=== Mou's moral metaphysics ===
Moral metaphysical systems have been proposed prior to Mou, most notably in the Platonic Form of the Good and the Confucian concept of dao. In one sense, Mou's philosophy attempts to reconcile these systems. Concurrently, Mou's philosophy was influenced by Yogacara Buddhism, which believes that no objectivity is possible aside from subjectivity. Mou's beliefs regarding the relationship between philosophy and culture and his view of the future of humanity dictate his construction of a philosophy that argues for the necessity to develop “Confucian Modernity”. Akin to his view of intellectual intuition, Mou constructs a vertical philosophical system that emphasizes the relation between the subject and an ontological objective, as opposed to a horizontal system where one's relationship to the world functions through the subject-object dichotomy. Mou's ontological ultimate is benti, or ultimate reality. Mou's moral metaphysics, which includes the natural and ethical universe, attempts to validate morality through the notion of tiandao, the principle of the natural universe, which, for Mou, equates to the moral principle. Further, Mou believes that one's uncomfortable reaction to crime and degeneracy indicates the presence of moral consciousness, which Mou signifies as the inner essence of human beings. This belief, that the infinite within benti similarly exists within human beings, known as the doctrine of infinite mind, can be compared with Heidegger's acceptance of being-with-others as a feature of Dasein, Wittgenstein’s rejection of a private language, and Husserl’s discussion of the immediacy of our recognition of others and their mental states within the lived world.

Subsequently, Mou uses 良知 (liangzhi, or good consciousness) and 智的直觉 (zhi de zhijue, or intellectual intuition) to identify the substance in his system. Again, Mou chooses to translate his philosophy in Kantian terminology. Here, liangzhi refers to the foundation or essence of morality. Within Confucianism liangzhi also means the essence of human beings, explaining why Mou writes that, “the substance of human being is one and the same as that of the world, the world of value, but not the world of reality.” For Mou, this substance is independent of social background. This idea reflects the human nature proposed by Mencius through the example of the apparent, innate reaction of an individual to seeing a child sitting precariously on a well (The Four Beginnings). Here, Mou departs from traditional Confucianism by defining the essence of an individual in terms of modern individualism. Thus with regards to Mencius’ example, it is the very life of the child that evokes a reaction, and not the individual's relation to the child. Mou notes that the basic implications of this example – an individual's inherent benevolence – are consistent with the autonomy of a moral subject. This autonomy, the motivating force for morality according to Mou, exists within the transcendental and philosophical mind of the individual.

In accord with his notions of intellectual intuition, Mou is committed to the idea of moral transformation, whereby all individuals can transcend themselves to ultimately become sages. Mou borrows this conception of moral transformation from Confucianism, as well as the concept of summum bonum, in which there exists a connection between one's worthiness of happiness and the actual attainment of happiness.

=== Discussion and criticism of Mou’s philosophy ===
Several consequences arise from Mou's moral metaphysics. Some scholars view Mou as a defender of Zen Buddhism over other critical Buddhisms, pointing to Mou's morality, which, similar to Zen Buddhism, maintains that the possibility of enlightenment is more important than actually attaining it. Additionally, ascribing human beings intellectual intuition ultimately assigns humans moral responsibility. However, this allows individuals access to Kant's noumenon. According to Mou, intellectual intuition for human beings is the foundation of all of Chinese thought. In Phenomena and Noumena Mou Zongsan writes that, “if it is true that human beings cannot have intellectual intuition, then the whole of Chinese philosophy must collapse completely”. Despite the fact that this is Mou's claim, many scholars debate its validity, maintaining the legitimacy of Chinese philosophy and New Confucianism independent of intellectual intuition.

Some traditional Confucians reject Mou, citing his wholesale acceptance of Western liberty and democracy as problematic. Despite Mou's attempt at Confucian Modernity, critics claim that New Confucianism cannot handle modernity's interconnectedness and its inevitable negative consequences. Others argue that because Mou is not political, he should not even be considered a Confucian because much of Confucian doctrine advocates for the active pursuit of change. However, the limitations of speech in China during the time period when Mou philosophized may address this criticism.

== Students ==
- Cai Renhou 蔡仁厚
- Dai Lianzhang 戴璉璋
- Wang Bangxiong 王邦雄
- Zeng Zhaoxu 曾昭旭
- Lu Xuekun 盧雪崑
- Huizhen You 尤惠貞
- Chen Guimiao 陳癸淼
- Wei Zhengtong 韋政通
- He Shujing 何淑靜
- Zhu Jianmin 朱建民
- Fan Liangguang 范良光
- Wang Caigui 王財貴
- Lee Shui-chuen 李瑞全
- Zhou Yangshan 周楊山
- Yang Zuhan 楊祖漢
- Yan Guoming 顏國明
- Lin Yuehui 林月惠
- Li Minghui 李明輝
- Zhuang Yaolang 莊耀郎
- Liu Jinxian 劉錦賢
- Xie Daning 謝大寧
- Lin Anwu 林安梧
- Fan Kewei 樊克偉
- Tu Weiming 杜維明
- Wu Rujun (Ng Yu-kwan) 吳汝鈞
- Chen Rongzhuo (Wing-cheuk Chan) 陳榮灼
