= Lee Shui-chuen =

Lee Shui-chuen (Chinese: 李瑞全; born 1948) is a Chinese bioethicist in the contemporary Confucian tradition of ethical thought. A professor and a former director of the Graduate Institute of Philosophy of National Central University, he received his B.A. and M.Phil. in philosophy in The Chinese University of Hong Kong under the supervision of the renowned contemporary New Confucianist professors Tang Chun-I and Mou Tsung-san. He received his PhD with the Graduate Institute of Philosophy, Southern Illinois University, US.

== Teaching ==
Lee has taught at various universities, including Tunghai University, the Chinese University of Hong Kong, and National Central University. Since 1998 he has been the chief investigator of a research group of the ELSI problem of human genome project. In order to promote studies and research in bioethics in Taiwan, he organized a number of international conferences on bioethics.

== Associations ==
Lee is the founding member, board member, and president (2006–2008) of the Taiwan Bioethics Association. He has served as the vice president of the Chinese Professional Association of Bioethics and as vice president of the Asian Bioethics Association. He is currently the editor-in-chief of the National Central University Journal of Humanities.

== Publications ==
Besides writing six books, Lee has published over a hundred journal articles and book chapters both in Chinese and English. He has edited a number of books in Chinese philosophy, business ethics, environmental ethics as well as bioethics, including most recently the book The Family, Medical Decision-Making, and Biotechnology: Critical Reflections on Asian Moral Perspectives (2007), in Springer's Asian Studies in Bioethics and the Philosophy of Medicine Series. His main interests are contemporary Confucianism, Hume, Kant, bioethics and applied ethics.

=== Books ===
- Philosophical Explorations of Contemporary New Confucianism (1993) in Chinese
- Hume (1993) in Chinese
- Confucian Bioethics (1999) in Chinese
- Applied Ethics and Modern Society (2006, co-author) in Chinese
- Clinical Ethics Consultations: Theory and Practice (2008, co-author) in Chinese
- Confucian Theory of the Sources of Moral Normativity (2014) in Chinese
