= Ch'ien Mu =

Chinese historian, philosopher and writer (1895–1990)

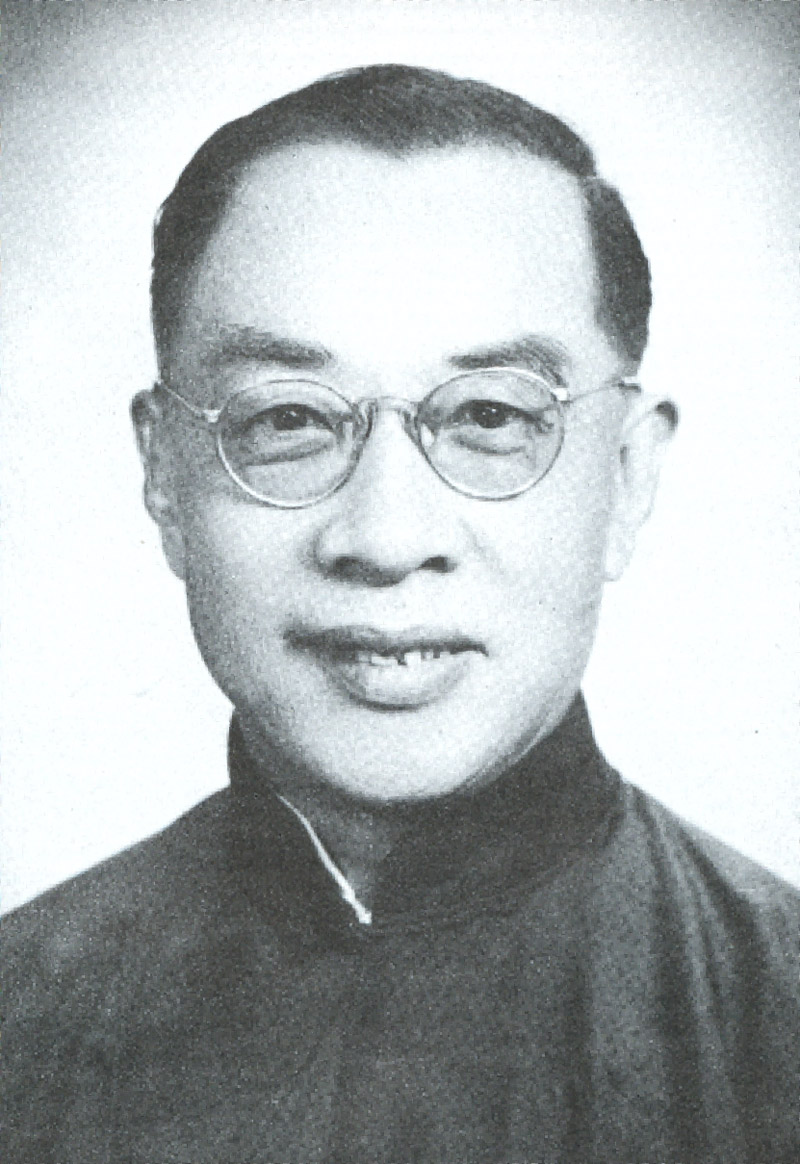
- Born: 30 July 1895; Jiangsu Province, Qing Empire
- Died: 30 August 1990 (aged 95); Taipei, Taiwan

Philosophical work
- Main interests: Chinese History; Intellectual History; Confucianism; New Confucianism

Ch'ien Mu
- Traditional Chinese: 錢穆
- Simplified Chinese: 钱穆
Transcriptions
Standard Mandarin
- Hanyu Pinyin: Qián Mù
- Gwoyeu Romatzyh: Chyan Muh
- Wade–Giles: Ch'ien^{2} Mu^{4}
- IPA: [tɕʰjɛ̌n mû]
Wu
- Romanization: Ziẽ́ Móʔ
Yue: Cantonese
- Yale Romanization: Chìhn Muhk
- Jyutping: Cin^{4} Muk^{6}
Southern Min
- Hokkien POJ: Tsînn Bo̍k

Courtesy name
- Traditional Chinese: 賓四
- Simplified Chinese: 宾四
Transcriptions
Standard Mandarin
- Hanyu Pinyin: Bīnsì
- Gwoyeu Romatzyh: Binsyh
- Wade–Giles: Pin^{1}-ssu^{4}
Wu
- Romanization: Pīn-sy̌
Yue: Cantonese
- Yale Romanization: Bān-sei
- Jyutping: Ban^{1}-sei^{3}
Southern Min
- Hokkien POJ: Pin-sì

Ch'ien Mu or Qian Mu (Chinese: 錢穆; 30 July 1895 – 30 August 1990) was a Chinese historian, philosopher and writer. He is considered to be one of the greatest historians and philosophers of 20th-century China. Ch'ien, together with Lü Simian, Chen Yinke and Chen Yuan, was known as the "Four Greatest Historians of Modern China" (現代四大史學家).

== Life ==
=== Early life: Jiangsu, Beijing ===
Ch'ien Mu was born in Qifang Qiao Village (七房橋, lit. 'Seven Mansions Bridge Village') in Wuxi, Jiangsu Province. He was from the prestigious Qian (Ch'ien) family in Wuxi, with his ancestor said to be Qian Liu (852–932), founder of the Wuyue Kingdom (907–978) during the Five Dynasties and Ten Kingdoms period. Ch'ien's biographer Jerry Dennerlien described his childhood world as the "small peasant cosmos" of rituals, festivals, and beliefs held the family system together. He received little formal education, but gained his knowledge on Chinese history and culture through traditional family school education and continuous self-study.

At eighteen years old, Ch'ien began his teaching career as a primary school teacher in his hometown. In 1930, he was hired as a lecturer in Yenching University following a recommendation and invitation by famous historian Gu Jiegang. Ch'ien continued teaching at several other universities, including Tsinghua University and Peking University, until 1937 when Peking (now Beijing) was occupied by the Japanese army.

=== Yunnan ===
In 1937, to escape the Japanese invasion and ensure students could continue their studies, Peking University, Tsinghua University, and Nankai University relocated south and formed Changsha Temporary University in Changsha and later National Southwestern Associated University in Kunming and Mengzi, two cities in Yunnan Province. During this time, the entire young generation was preoccupied with a single question: Does China have hope?

The following year, the Ministry of Education of China required all higher education institutions to make "General History of China" a compulsory course for first-year students. However, there was no suitable textbook available. Encouraged by his colleague Chen Mengjia, Ch'ien wrote the Outline of National History (國史大綱) while carrying out his teaching duties. In this work, he conveyed a powerful message: China would not fall. He argued that its endurance stemmed from a "civilizational power" grounded in a belief in core values. Many students were inspired.

=== Hong Kong ===
In 1949, amid the victory of the Chinese Communist Party in the Chinese Civil War, Ch'ien moved to British Hong Kong at Chang Ch'i-yun's suggestion. With help from the Yale-China Association, along with Tang Chun-i, Tchang Pi-kai and other scholars, Ch'ien co-founded New Asia College. He served as the president of New Asia College from 1949 to 1965. This college has graduated many great scholars and outstanding members of various communities. Ch'ien resigned from presidency after New Asia College became a member college of The Chinese University of Hong Kong and moved to Ma Liu Shui. Publicly, he reasons that he wanted to devote more time to his scholarship, but in private revealed that he felt that the college had lost its freedom and might eventually disappear. He then founded New Asia Middle School as a non-profit-making Chinese secondary school at the former campus of the college. Ch'ien later received honorary doctorates from Yale University and the University of Hong Kong.

He taught at the University of Malaya in Kuala Lumpur before returning to Hong Kong.

=== Taiwan ===
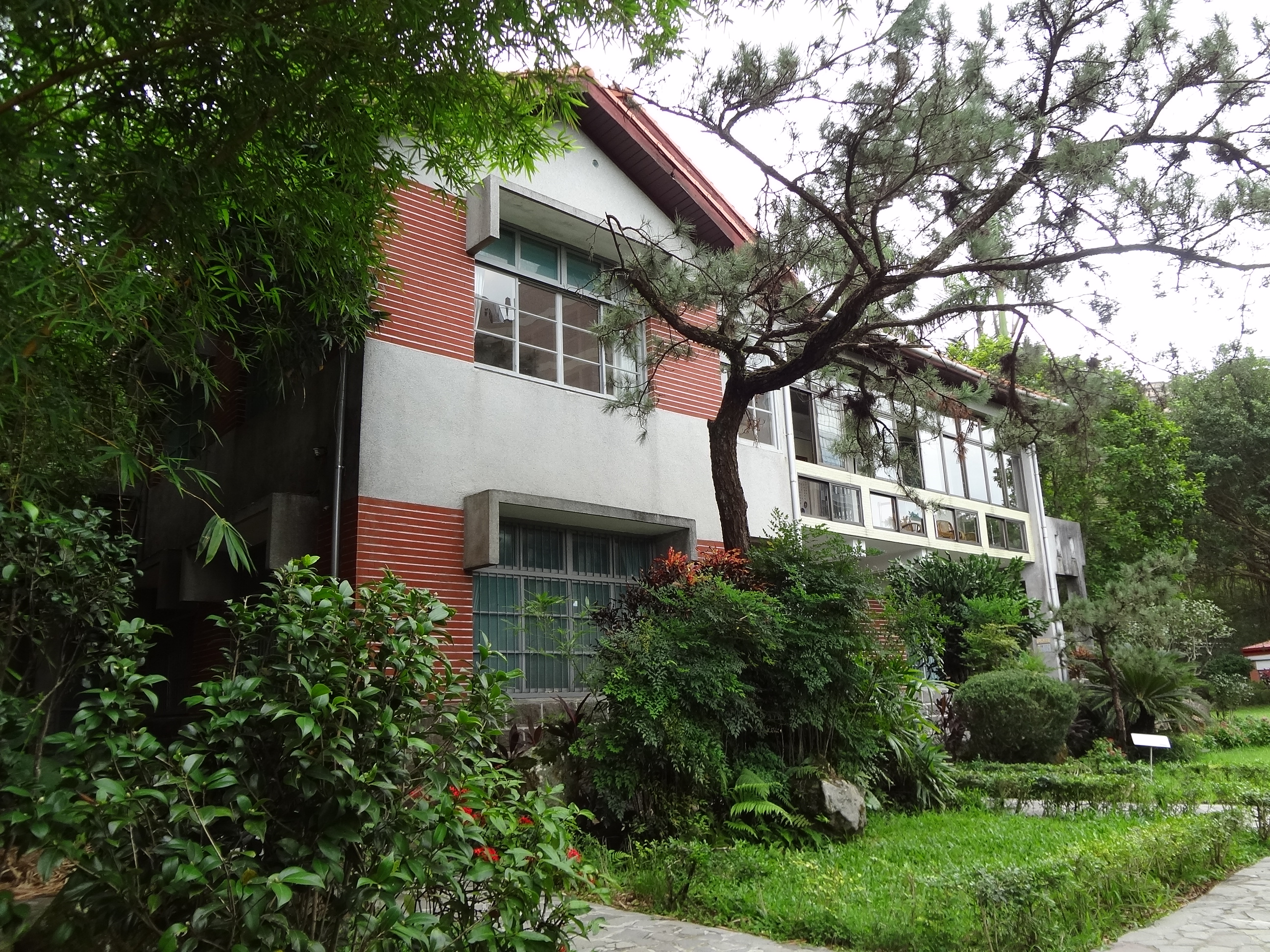
Chien Mu House in Taipei, Taiwan.

Ch'ien relocated to Taiwan in October 1967 after accepting an invitation from President Chiang Kai-shek, in response to the 1967 Hong Kong riots. In 1968, he was selected as a member of the Academia Sinica, which remedied a little his lifelong regret for not being able to be elected as a member of this Institute in the first election in 1948.

He was given land in Waishuangxi in the Shilin District to build his home Sushulou (素書樓) while continuing as a freelance academic researching and giving lectures at universities in Taiwan.

Ch'ien retired from teaching in 1984. After becoming one of the three constituent colleges of the Chinese University of Hong Kong, in 1978 New Asia College inaugurated the Ch'ien Mu Lectures in his honor.

On 1 June 1990, two Democratic Progressive Party politicians, Chen Shui-bian and Chou Po-lun, accused Ch'ien of occupying public land as the nature of gifting the land for Sushulou by Chiang Kai-shek to a private citizen was deemed to be illegal. Ch'ien and his wife moved out of Sushulou and relocated to a high-rise apartment in downtown Taipei City.

Ch'ien died on 30 August 1990, a little less than three months after being forced to move out of Sushulou. Many of Ch'ien's supporters condemned the practice Chen and Chou of using Ch'ien for scoring political points against the Kuomintang. Both Chen and Chou have since apologized for the damages of their accusations towards Ch'ien, and Sushulou is now the location of the Ch'ien Mu Memorial.

In 1992, he was buried in his hometown Wuxi, by the shores of Lake Tai.

== Works ==
Ch'ien wrote extensively on Chinese classics, history and Confucian thought. Unlike many 20th-century Chinese intellectuals influenced by the New Culture Movement of the 1910s who were fundamentally skeptical of traditional Chinese thought and Confucianism, he insisted on the importance of traditional values of Chinese culture. By the time of his death in 1990, his objections to the rejection of tradition of Confucianism had gained wider credence, partly through the influence of his student at New Asia College, Yu Ying-shih.

Ch'ien Mu was an extremely industrious and prolific scholar who had about 76 works published during his life, which exceeded 17 000 000 words in total. After his death, his complete works were collected and edited into 54 volumes, published in 1994 by Linking Publishing Company in Taipei. In 2011, a revised edition of his complete works was published in Beijing by Jiuzhou Publishing Company in traditional Chinese characters.

Representative works:

1. A General History of China (Guoshi dagang, 國史大綱);
2. Comments on the chin wen/ku wen (New Text/Old Text) Controversy in Han (Lianghan jingxue jin gu wen pingyi, 兩漢經學今古文評議)
3. A New Biography of Zhu Xi's Academic Life (Zhuzi xin xue'an, 朱子新學案)
4. A Scholastic History of China in Late 300 Years (Zhongguo jin sanbai nian xueshu shi, 中國近三百年學術史)
5. History of the Qin and Han Dynasty (Qin Han shi, 秦漢史)
6. Neo-Confucianism during Song and Ming Dynasty (Song Ming Lixue, 宋明理學)
7. Examining Chinese People and Culture Through Chinese History (Cong Zhongguo lishi lai kan Zhongguo minzu xing ji Zhongguo wenhua, 從中國歷史來看中國民族性及中國文化)
8. General Discussions on Zhuang Zi and Lao Zi (Zhuang Lao Tongbian, 莊老通辨)

== Criticism ==
Critics of Ch'ien's ideas, such as Li Ao, tend to focus on his superficial knowledge of non-Chinese currents of thoughts when he wrote his treatises on cultural studies, and his lack of objective, scientific method-based, defense of traditional Chinese culture. Wong Young-tsu condemns Ch'ien's own bias as "19th century traditionalist" in his "A Comment on Ch'ien Mu's Treatise on Chinese Scholarships During the Qing Dynasty" (錢穆論清學史述評) for being unable to view 19th century currents of thoughts with contemporary (20th century) perspectives. It could be argued, however, the opposition is based upon the critics' support of the New Culture Movement's legacies, which Ch'ien explicitly rejected.

Another recurring theme from Ch'ien's critics, from the 1930s onwards, concerns his defense of traditional Chinese political system, headed by a monarch but with the government filled by examinations-based mandarins, as a representative form of government, as a simplistic fantasy.

Ch'ien Mu was also criticized for having invested in too many different academic fields. For example, his research on Chinese Literature was considered as "unprofessional". His work on Daoism and Zhuangzi : Zhuangzi Zuan Jian 莊子纂箋 had also drawn him criticisms for long.

== Memorial ==
- New Asia College Ch'ien Mu Library
- Former Residence of Ch'ien Mu in Hongshan 鴻山 of Wuxi (Jiangsu Province)

== References and further reading ==
- Jerry Dennerline, Qian Mu and the World of Seven Mansions (New Haven: Yale University Press, 1988).
- Yu Yingshi, You ji feng chui shuishang lin--jing dao Qian Binsi shi 犹记风吹水上粼－敬悼钱宾四师, collected in Xiandai xueshu yu xueren 现代学术与学人 (Guilin: Guangxi Normal University Press, 2006).
- Yan Gengwang 严耕望, Qian Mu Binsi xiansheng yu wo 钱穆宾四先生与我, collected in Zhi shi san shu 治史三书 (Shanghai: People's Publishing House, 2011).
- Chou, Grace Ai-ling (2011). Confucianism, Colonialism, and the Cold War Chinese Cultural Education at Hong Kong's New Asia College, 1949-63. Leiden: Brill. ISBN 9789004217348.

== Portrait ==
- Qian Mu. A Portrait by Kong Kai Ming at Portrait Gallery of Chinese Writers (Hong Kong Baptist University Library).

Academic offices
Preceded by College established	President of New Asia College; 1949-1965	Succeeded by Ou Tsuin-chen
