= Chien Mu House =

Historic house in Shilin, Taipei, Taiwan

- 錢穆故居
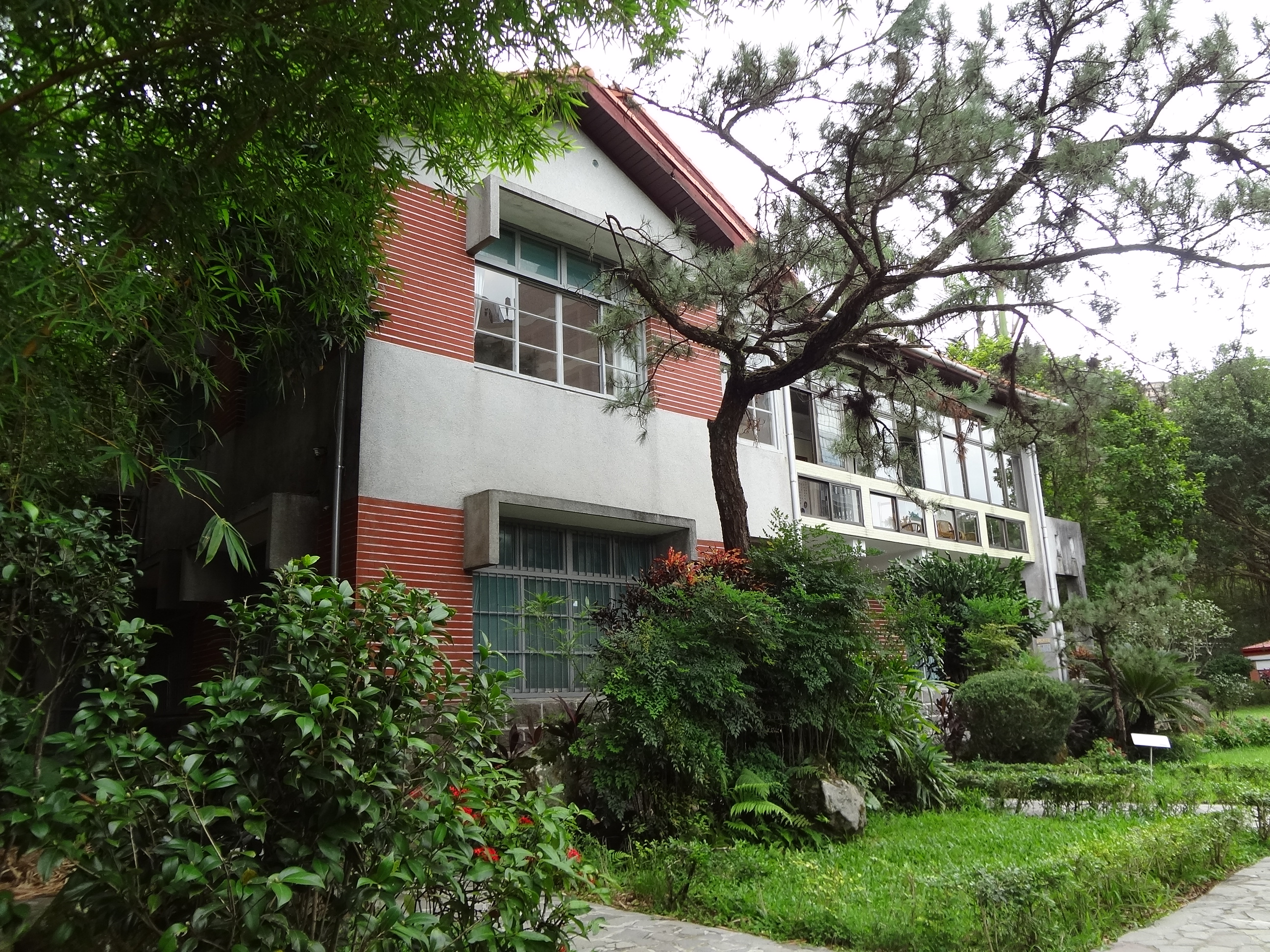
- Interactive map of the Chien Mu House area

General information
- Type: former house
- Location: Shilin, Taipei, Taiwan
- Coordinates: 25°05′38.8″N 121°32′52.6″E
- Opened: 29 March 2002
- Renovated: 2000

Design and construction
- Architect: Chien Hu Mei-chi

The Chien Mu House (traditional Chinese: 錢穆故居; simplified Chinese: 钱穆故居; pinyin: Qiánmù Gùjū) is a former house of Ch'ien Mu in Shilin District, Taipei, Taiwan. The house is located inside Soochow University and managed by the university.

== History ==
The house was constructed after Ch'ien Mu arrived in Taiwan from British Hong Kong in 1967 after the Hong Kong leftist riots which was known as Su Shu Building. After Ch'ien Mu died in 1990, the Taipei City Government established the Chien Mu Memorial Library at the house on 6 January 1992. In 2000, the house underwent renovation by the city government. On 31 December 2001, the Department of Cultural Affairs of the city government renamed the house to Chien Mu House and handed over to Soochow University for its operations. It was then handed over again to Taipei Municipal University of Education on 1 January 2011.

== Transportation ==
The house is accessible by bus from Shilin Station of Taipei Metro.

== See also ==
- List of tourist attractions in Taiwan
