= New Asia College =

Constituent college of the Chinese University of Hong Kong

Coordinates: 22.4210605°N 114.2087211°E

- 新亞書院
- Motto: 誠明
- Motto in English: Sincerity and intelligence
- Type: Public
- Established: 1949; 77 years ago
- Affiliations: The Chinese University of Hong Kong
- Chairman: Leung Ying Wai Charles
- President: Hector Sun-on Chan
- Dean: Cheung Kam-siu Kenneth
- Location: Hong Kong
- Website: na.cuhk.edu.hk

New Asia College
- Traditional Chinese: 新亞書院
- Simplified Chinese: 新亚书院
Transcriptions
Standard Mandarin
- Hanyu Pinyin: Xīn Yà Shūyuàn
Yue: Cantonese
- Yale Romanization: Sān'a Syūyuhn
- Jyutping: San1aa3 Syu1jyun6*2

New Asia College is a constituent college of the Chinese University of Hong Kong, a public university in New Territories, Hong Kong. The College was founded in 1949 by a group of scholars who left mainland China at the time of the 1949 Communist Revolution. It was located on Farm Road in Kowloon until 1963, when it joined two other colleges to form the Chinese University of Hong Kong.

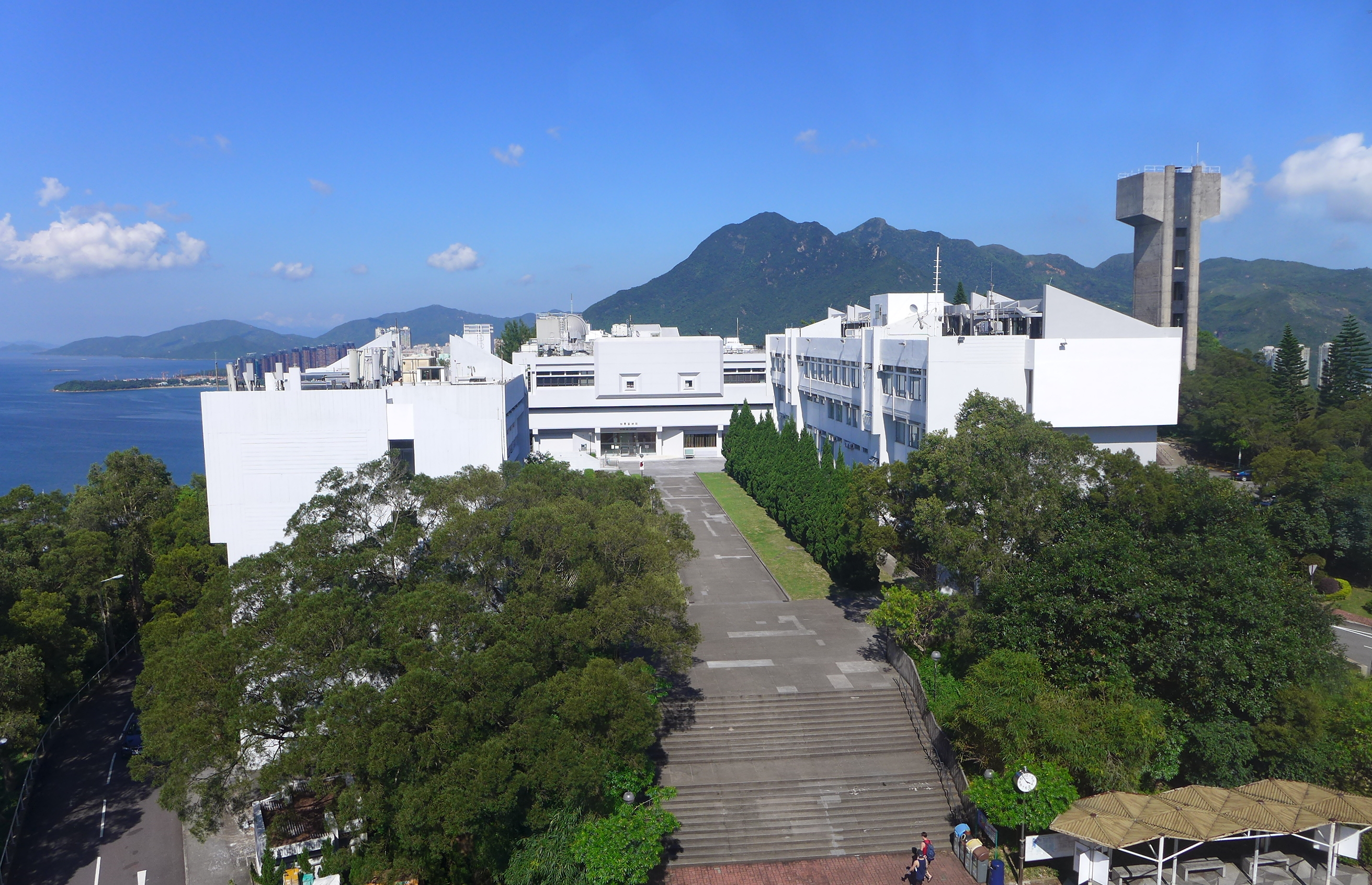
New Asia College Campus in Ma Liu Shui

== Campus ==
The college is located on a mount in the university campus with a view to Tide Cove and Ma On Shan. A circular road New Asia Circle (新亞坊) encircles the campus with New Asia Road (新亞路) leading to the central of the university, and United Road to United College, and Cheng Ming Link (誠明徑) to student residences.

Facilities include the New Asia College Ch'ien Mu Library, the Pavilion of Harmony; New Asia Clock Tower, Water Tower, and Amphitheater; busts and statues of Ch'ien Mu and Tang Chun-yi.

== History ==
New Asia College was founded in 1949 by mainland Chinese scholars Ch'ien Mu (Qian Mu), Tang Junyi (Tang Chun-i), and Zhang Pijie (Tchang Pi-kai) in Hong Kong, then a British dependency, after the Communist victory in mainland China. During its early years, it received substantial support from the American Yale-China Association, and hosted Yale-in-China "Bachelors," recent Yale graduates who taught English and other subjects.

In 1963, the college joined forces with United College and Chung Chi College to form the Chinese University of Hong Kong under a charter granted by the Legislative Council of Hong Kong. The college has since then become a research and educational hub for Confucian philosophy and Chinese studies.

== Presidents and Heads ==
Presidents and heads of New Asia College:

=== Presidents (1949–1977) ===
1. Prof. Ch'ien Mu (1949–1965)
2. Prof. Ou Tsuin-chen (1965–1969)
3. Prof. Shen Yi-chen (1969–1970)
4. Prof. Mei Yi-pao (1970–1973)
5. Prof. Yu Ying-shih (1973–1975)
6. Prof. Chuan Han-sheng (1975–1977)

=== College heads (1977–present) ===
7. Prof. Ambrose King (1977–1985)
8. Prof. Lin Tzong-biau (1985–1992)
9. Prof. Leung Ping-chung (1992–2002)
10. Prof. Henry N. C. Wong (2002–2010)
11. Prof. Shun Kwong-loi (2010–2013)
12. Prof. Henry N. C. Wong (2014–2020)
13. Prof. Hector Sun-on Chan (2021–present)

== Student hostels ==
The New Asia College has a total of five student hostels which can accommodate around 1,465 students.

=== Chih Hsing Hall ===
Established in 1974, it was previously known as Mu Chai and New Asia's First Student Hostel before receiving its current name in 1979. It's a men's hostel.

=== Xuesi Hall ===
A women's hostel established in 1978, named by the then Head of the College Ambrose King.

=== Grace Tien Hall ===
Established in 1982 and provides around 284 places for students of both gender.

=== Daisy Li Hall ===
Established in 2002 and provides around 315 places for students.

=== Mei Yun Tang ===
Established in 2023. It consists of three blocks which provide 300 residential places and features a multipurpose hall. It was the winner of the "HKIA Award 2022/23 - Residential Building" among the Annual Awards of the Hong Kong Institute of Archietcts (HKIA) and was the first student hostel within the CUHK campus to receive the award.

== Notable alumni ==
- Vincent Cheng (1973) — chairman of HSBC China (2005–11); chairman of The Hongkong and Shanghai Banking Corporation (2005–10)
- Lavender Cheung (1993) — news anchor at Cable TV Hong Kong (1998–2009)
- Man-kwong Cheung (1978) — member of the Legislative Council from the Education constituency (1991–97, 1998–2012); president of the Hong Kong Professional Teachers' Union (1990–2010)
- Ming-kwai Lee (1972) — Commissioner of Police (2003–07)
- Sammy Leung (1994) — DJ, MC, and actor
- Lap-Chee Tsui (1972) — geneticist; vice-chancellor and president of the University of Hong Kong (2002–14)
- Ying-shih Yu (1952) — historian; tenured professor at Harvard University, Yale University, and Princeton University

== See also ==
- New Asia Middle School
- Chinese University of Hong Kong
