= Buddhist philosophy =

Buddhist philosophical tradition

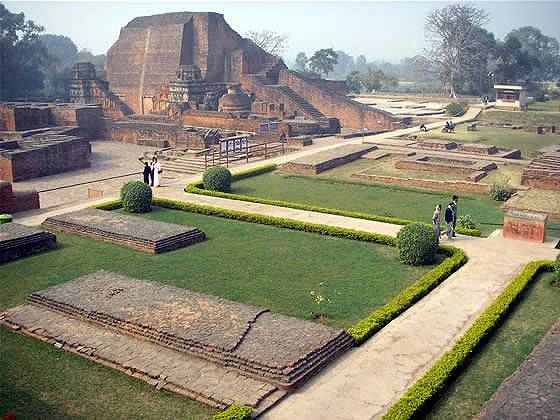
The Buddhist Nalanda mahāvihāra (great monastery) was a major institution of higher-learning in ancient India from the 5th century CE until the 12th century.

Buddhist philosophy is the ancient Indian philosophical system that developed within the religio-philosophical tradition of Buddhism. It encompasses the philosophical ideas and systems of inquiry developed by Buddhist schools in ancient India following the parinirvāṇa of Gautama Buddha (c. 5th century BCE), as well as subsequent developments across Asia.

Buddhism combines both philosophical reasoning and the practice of meditation. The Buddhist religion presents a multitude of Buddhist paths to liberation; and with the expansion of early Buddhism from ancient India to Sri Lanka and subsequently to East Asia and Southeast Asia, Buddhist philosophers have examined subjects including cosmology, ethics, epistemology, logic, metaphysics, ontology, phenomenology, the philosophy of mind, the philosophy of time, and soteriology.

Early Buddhist texts describe the Buddha as declining to answer certain metaphysical questions because he considered them irrelevant to the attainment of liberation. However, his teachings also included doctrines with metaphysical implications, such as dependent arising, karma, and rebirth.

Particular points of Buddhist philosophy have often been the subject of disputes between different schools of Buddhism, as well as between representative thinkers of Buddhist schools and Hindu or Jain philosophers. These elaborations and disputes gave rise to various early Buddhist schools of Abhidharma, the Mahāyāna movement, and scholastic traditions such as Prajñāpāramitā, Sarvāstivāda, Mādhyamaka, Sautrāntika, Vaibhāṣika, Buddha-nature, Yogācāra, and more. One recurrent theme in Buddhist philosophy has been the desire to find a Middle Way between philosophical views seen as extreme.

== Historical phases of Buddhist philosophy ==
Edward Conze splits the development of Indian Buddhist philosophy into three phases:

1. The phase of the pre-sectarian Buddhist doctrines derived from oral traditions that originated during the life of Gautama Buddha, and are common to all later schools of Buddhism.
2. The second phase concerns non-Mahāyāna "scholastic" Buddhism, as evident in the Abhidharma texts beginning in the 3rd century BCE, that feature scholastic reworking and schematic classification of material in the early Buddhist texts. The Abhidhamma philosophy of the Theravāda school belongs to this phase.
3. The third phase concerns Mahāyāna Buddhism, beginning in the late first century CE. This movement emphasizes the path of a bodhisattva and includes various schools of thought, such as Prajñāpāramitā, Mādhyamaka, Sautrāntika, Buddha-nature, and Yogācāra.

Various elements of these three phases are incorporated and/or further developed in the philosophy and worldview of the various sects of Buddhism that then emerged.

== Philosophical orientation ==
Buddhism is an Indian religion and dhārma that encompasses a variety of traditions, beliefs, and spiritual practices based on teachings attributed to Gautama Buddha (5th century BCE), but diversified since then in a wide variety of schools and traditions. Buddhism originated in ancient India, from where the Buddhadhārma spread from the northeastern region of the Indian subcontinent throughout Central Asia, East Asia, Mainland Southeast Asia, and Maritime Southeast Asia. Philosophy in ancient India was aimed primarily at spiritual liberation and had soteriological goals. In his study of the Mādhyamaka and Sautrāntika schools of Buddhist philosophy in ancient India, Peter Deller Santina writes:

Attention must first of all be drawn to the fact that philosophical systems in India were seldom, if ever, purely speculative or descriptive. Virtually all the great philosophical systems of India: Sāṃkhya, Advaita Vedānta, Mādhyamaka and so forth, were preeminently concerned with providing a means to liberation or salvation. It was a tacit assumption with these systems that if their philosophy were correctly understood and assimilated, an unconditioned state free of suffering and limitation could be achieved. [...] If this fact is overlooked, as often happens as a result of the propensity engendered by formal Occidental philosophy to consider the philosophical enterprise as a purely descriptive one, the real significance of Indian and Buddhist philosophy will be missed.

For the Indian Buddhist philosophers, the teachings of Gautama Buddha were not meant to be taken on faith alone, but to be confirmed by logical analysis and inquiry (pramāṇa) of the world. The early Buddhist texts mention that a person becomes a follower of the Buddha's teachings after having pondered them over with wisdom (jñana) and the gradual training also requires that a disciple "investigate" (upaparikkhati) and "scrutinize" (tuleti) the teachings. The Buddha also expected his disciples to approach him as a teacher in a critical fashion and scrutinize his actions and words, as shown in the Vīmaṃsaka Sutta.

Some Buddhist thinkers even argued that systems of rational reflection and philosophical analysis were a central practice which was necessary for the attainment of insight during meditation. Thus, Mahāyāna philosophers like Prajñakaragupta argue that one is not a yogi "merely because of meditation"; rather, one must meditate, listen to the teachings, and understand them by "reflecting through rational inquiry" (yukti-cintāmaya). Only through this method, which combined rational reflection and the practice of meditation, will the wisdom that leads to enlightenment arise.

== The Buddha and early Buddhism ==
Buddhism is devoted primarily to gaining correct insight (bodhi, awakening or enlightenment) into our attachment to changing (anicca), 'unreliable' (Duḥkha) things, and the subsequent development (bhavana) of ahimsa and the 'blowing out' (nirvāṇa) of these attachments through the threefold trainings (ethical conduct, meditative absorption, and wisdom). Classical Indian Buddhism emphasized the importance of the individual's self-cultivation (through numerous spiritual practices like keeping ethical precepts, Buddhist meditation, and worship) in the process of liberation from the defilements which keep us bound to the cycle of rebirth. According to the standard Buddhist scholastic understanding, liberation arises when the proper spiritual qualities (dharmas) are cultivated and when the mind has been purified of its attachment to fetters and hindrances that produce unwholesome mental factors (various called defilements, poisons, or fluxes). This cultivation is traditionally interpreted as a liberation of sentient beings from saṃsāra (the cycle of compulsory birth, death, and rebirth)

=== The Buddha ===
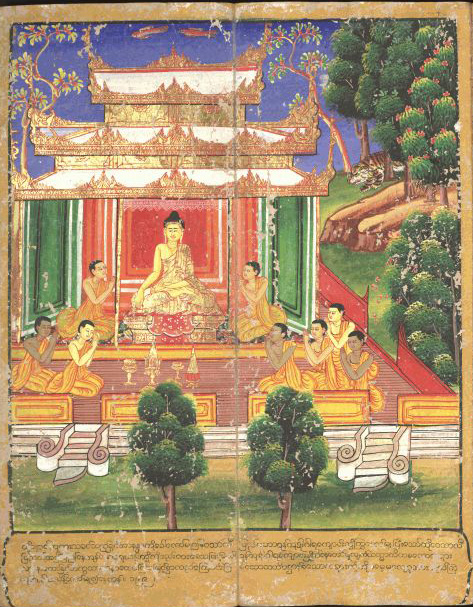
Gautama Buddha surrounded by his followers. Illustration from an 18th-century Burmese watercolour, Bodleian Library.

Scholars disagree on whether Gautama Buddha's teachings should be understood as a form of philosophical inquiry. Siddartha Gautama (c. 5th century BCE) was a north Indian Śramaṇa (wandering ascetic), whose teachings are preserved in the Pāli Nikayas and in the Āgamas as well as in other surviving fragmentary textual collections, collectively known as the early Buddhist texts. Scholars have not established which parts of these texts can be attributed to the historical Buddha. While the focus of the Buddha's teachings is about attaining the highest good of nirvāṇa, they also contain an analysis of the source of human suffering (duḥkha), the nature of personal identity (ātman), and the process of acquiring knowledge (prajña) about the world.

=== The Middle Way ===
The Buddha defined his teaching as "the Middle Way" (Pāli: majjhimāpaṭipadā). In the Dharmacakrapravartana Sūtra, this is used to refer to the fact that his teachings steer a middle course between the extremes of asceticism and bodily denial (as practiced by the Jains and other Indian ascetic groups) and sensual hedonism or indulgence. Many Śramaṇa ascetics of the Buddha's time placed much emphasis on a denial of the body, using practices such as fasting, to liberate the mind from the body. Gautama Buddha, however, realized that the mind was embodied and causally dependent on the body, and therefore that a malnourished body did not allow the mind to be trained and developed. Thus, Buddhism's main concern is not with luxury or poverty, but instead with the human response to circumstances.

Another related teaching of the historical Buddha is "the teaching through the middle" (majjhena dhammaṃ desana), which claims to be a metaphysical middle path between the extremes of eternalism and annihilationism, as well as the extremes of existence and non-existence. This idea would become central to later Buddhist metaphysics, as all Buddhist philosophies would claim to steer a metaphysical middle course.

=== Basic teachings ===
Several teachings recur throughout the early Buddhist texts. Based on these textual similarities, earlier scholarship has identified the following doctrines as teachings that may originate with the historical Buddha:

- The Four Noble Truths, which provide an analysis of the cause of suffering (duḥkha)
- The Noble Eightfold Path, which illustrate the path to spiritual liberation (mokṣa)
- The four dhyānas (meditations)
- The three marks of existence, three characteristics which apply to all phenomena and which are: suffering (duḥkha), impermanence (anicca), and non-self (anattā)
- The five aggregates of clinging (skandhā), which provide an analysis of personal identity and physical existence
- Dependent origination (pratītyasamutpāda), a complex doctrine which analyzes the how living beings come to be and how they are conditioned by various psycho-physical processes
- Karma and rebirth, actions which lead to a new existence after death, in an endless cycle of birth, death, and rebirth (saṃsāra)
- Nirvāṇa, the ultimate soteriological goal which leads to the cessation of all suffering

According to N. Ross Reat, all of these doctrines are shared by the Pāli Canon of Theravāda Buddhism and the Śālistamba Sūtra belonging to the Mahāsāṃghika school. A recent study by Bhikkhu Analayo concludes that the Theravādin Majjhima Nikāya and the Sarvāstivādin Madhyama Āgama contain mostly the same major Buddhist doctrines. Richard G. Salomon, in his study of the Gandhāran Buddhist texts (which are the earliest manuscripts containing discourses attributed to Gautama Buddha), has confirmed that their teachings are "consistent with non-Mahayana Buddhism, which survives today in the Theravada school of Sri Lanka and Southeast Asia, but which in ancient times was represented by eighteen separate schools."

Scholars such as Schmithausen, Vetter, and Bronkhorst have identified differences among the doctrines preserved in early Buddhist texts. They present alternative possibilities for what was taught in earliest Buddhism and question the authenticity of certain teachings and doctrines. Some scholars disagree over whether the doctrine ofkarma was not central to the teachings of the historical Buddha, while others disagree with this position. Likewise, there is scholarly disagreement on whether insight into the true nature of reality (prajña) was seen as liberating in earliest Buddhism or whether it was a later addition. according to Vetter and Bronkhorst, dhyāna constituted the original "liberating practice", while discriminating insight into transiency as a separate path to liberation was a later development.Bronkhorst and Carol Anderson question whether the Four Noble Truths formed part of the earliest Buddhist teachings. Anderson argues that they emerged as a central teaching during a later period, before the final redaction of the Buddhist canons.

Some interpretations of early Buddhist philosophy emphasise its rejection of certain doctrines over the establishment of positive philosophical positions. (Note: See for example Thanissaro Bhikkhu's commentary on the Mulapariyaya Sutta, .) Only knowledge that is useful in attaining liberation is valued. This interpretation suggests that Buddhist philosophical schools developed as later Buddhists began systematically examining and expanding upon the philosophical ideas found in the Buddha's teachings and early Buddhist texts.

=== The Four Noble Truths and dependent causation ===
The Four Noble Truths or "Truths of the Noble One" are a central feature to the teachings of the historical Buddha and are put forth in the Dharmacakrapravartana Sūtra. The first truth concerns duḥkha, often translated as "suffering" or "unsatisfactoriness". In Buddhist philosophy, duḥkha encompasses not only physical pain and psychological distress but also the dissatisfaction associated with mortality and the impermanent nature of existence.

Suffering also arises because of contact with unpleasant events, and due to not getting what one desires. The second truth is that this unease arises out of conditions, mainly craving (taṇhā) and ignorance (avidyā). The third truth is then the fact that whenever sentient beings let go of craving and remove ignorance through insight and knowledge, suffering ceases (nirodhā). The fourth truth is the Noble Eightfold Path, which consists of eight practices that end suffering. They are: right view, right intention, right speech, right action, right livelihood, right effort, right mindfulness, and right samādhi (concentration, mental unification, meditation). The highest good and ultimate goal taught by the historical Buddha, which is the attainment of nirvāṇa, literally means "extinguishing" and signified "the complete extinguishing of greed, hatred, and delusion (i.e. ignorance), the forces which power saṃsāra".

Nirvāṇa also means that after an enlightened being's death, there is no further rebirth. In early Buddhism, the concept of dependent origination (pratītya-samutpāda) refers primarily to processes of mental conditioning rather than to all physical phenomena. Gautama Buddha understood the world in procedural terms, not in terms of things or substances. His theory posits a flux of events arising under certain conditions which are interconnected and dependent, such that the processes in question at no time are considered to be static or independent. Craving (taṇhā), for example, is always dependent on, and caused by sensations gained by the sense organs (āyatana). Sensations are always dependent on contact with our surroundings. Buddha's causal theory is simply descriptive: "This existing, that exists; this arising, that arises; this not existing, that does not exist; this ceasing, that ceases." This understanding of causation as "impersonal lawlike causal ordering" is important because it shows how the processes that give rise to suffering work, and also how they can be reversed.

The removal of suffering that stemmed from ignorance (avidyā), then, requires a deep understanding of the nature of reality (prajña). While philosophical analysis of arguments and concepts is clearly necessary to develop this understanding, it is not enough to remove our unskillful mental habits and deeply ingrained prejudices, which require meditation, paired with understanding. The Gandhāran Buddhist texts describe meditation as a means of developing an understanding the Three marks of existence: suffering, impermanence, and non-self (anātman). Buddhist teachings describe understanding and meditation as complementary practices that develop insight (Vipassana) into human experience and lead towards liberation.

=== Non-self ===
The Five Aggregates (pañcakkhandha)
according to the Pali Canon.

form (rūpa)
4 elements (mahābhūta)
	↓
	contact (phassa)
↓	↑
consciousness (viññāna)

→
←

←

mental factors (cetasika)
feeling (vedanā)
perception (sañña)
formation (saṅkhāra)

- Form is derived from the Four Great Elements.
- Consciousness arises from other aggregates.
- Mental Factors arise from the Contact of
  Consciousness and other aggregates.
- The five aggregates are no-self.

Source: MN 109 (Thanissaro, 2001) | diagram details

Gautama Buddha argued that compounded entities and sentient beings lacked essence, correspondingly the self is without essence (anātman). This means there is no part of a person which is unchanging and essential for continuity, and it means that there is no individual "part of the person that accounts for the identity of that person over time". This is in opposition to the Upanishadic concept of an unchanging ultimate self (ātman) and any view of an eternal soul. The Buddha held that attachment to the appearance of a permanent self in this world of change is the cause of suffering (duḥkha), and the main obstacle to the attainment of spiritual liberation (mokṣa).

One argument attributed to the Buddha against the existence of an unchanging self draws on the five aggregates (Skandha) and their impermanent nature. This argument can be put in this way:

1. All psycho-physical processes (skandhā) are impermanent.
2. If there were a self it would be permanent.

IP [There is no more to the person than the five aggregates of existence.]
∴ There is no self.

This argument requires the implied premise that the five aggregates are an exhaustive account of what makes up a person, or else the self could exist outside of these aggregates. This premise is affirmed in other Buddhist texts, such as Saṃyutta Nikāya 22.47, which states: "whatever ascetics and brahmins regard various kinds of things as self, all regard the five grasping aggregates, or one of them."

This argument is famously expounded in the Anātmalakṣaṇa Sūtra. According to this text, the apparently fixed self is merely the result of identification with the temporary aggregates of existence (skandhā), the changing processes making up an individual human being. In this view, a 'person' is only a convenient nominal designation on a certain grouping of processes and characteristics, and an 'individual' is a conceptual construction overlaid upon a stream of experiences, just like a chariot is merely a conventional designation for the parts of a chariot and how they are put together. The foundation of this argument is purely empiricist, for it is based on the fact that all we observe is subject to change, especially everything observed when looking inwardly in meditation.

Another argument fornon-self, known as the "argument from lack of control", holds that individuals cannot fully control or prevent changes to the five aggregates. Furthermore, it is also based on the "anti-reflexivity principle" of Indian philosophy, which states an entity cannot operate on or control itself (a knife can cut other things but not itself, a finger can point at other things but not at itself, etc.). This means then, that the self could never desire to change itself and could not do so; another reason for this is that, besides Buddhism, in the orthodox schools of Hindu philosophy the unchanging ultimate self (ātman) is perfectly blissful and does not suffer. The historical Buddha used this idea to attack the concept of self. This argument could be structured thus:

1. If the self existed it would be the part of the person that performs the executive function, the "controller."
2. The self could never desire that it be changed (anti-reflexivity principle).
3. Each of the five kinds of psycho-physical processes (skandhā) is such that one can desire that it be changed.

IP [There is no more to the person than the five aggregates of existence.]
∴ There is no self.

This argument then denies that there is one permanent "controller" in the person. Instead, it views the person as a set of constantly changing processes which include volitional events seeking change and an awareness of that desire for change. According to Mark Siderits:

What the Buddhist has in mind is that on one occasion one part of the person might perform the executive function, on another occasion another part might do so. This would make it possible for every part to be subject to control without there being any part that always fills the role of the controller (and so is the self). On some occasions, a given part might fall on the controller side, while on other occasions it might fall on the side of the controlled. This explains how individuals can attempt to change the aggregates even though, according to this argument, no permanent self exists beyond them.

As noted by K.R. Norman and Richard Gombrich, the Buddha extended his non-self critique to the Brahmanical belief expounded in the Brihadaranyaka Upanishad that the unchanging ultimate self (ātman) was indeed the whole world, or identical with Brahman. This concept is illustrated in the Alagaddupama Sūtra, where the Buddha argues that an individual cannot experience the suffering of the entire world. He used the example of someone carrying off and burning grass and sticks from the Jeta grove and how a monk would not sense or consider themselves harmed by that action. In this example, the Buddha is arguing that we do not have direct experience of the entire world, and hence the self cannot be the whole world. (Note: MN 22, Alagaddupama Sutta, "Bhikkhus, what do you think? If people carried off the grass, sticks, branches, and leaves in this Jeta Grove, or burned them, or did what they liked with them, would you think: 'People are carrying us off or burning us or doing what they like with us'?" – "No, venerable sir. Why not? Because that is neither our self nor what belongs to our self." .) In this Buddhist text, as well as in the Soattā Sūtra, the Buddha outlines six wrong views about self:

There are six wrong views: An unwise, untrained person may think of the body, 'This is mine, this is me, this is my self'; he may think that of feelings; of perceptions; of volitions; or of what has been seen, heard, thought, cognized, reached, sought or considered by the mind. The sixth is to identify the world and self, to believe: 'At death, I shall become permanent, eternal, unchanging, and so remain forever the same; and that is mine, that is me, that is my self.' A wise and well-trained person sees that all these positions are wrong, and so he is not worried about something that does not exist.

Furthermore, Gautama Buddha argued that the world can be observed to be a cause of suffering (Brahman was held to be ultimately blissful in the orthodox schools of Hindu philosophy) and that since we cannot control the world as we wish, the world cannot be the self. The idea that "this cosmos is the self" is one of the six wrong views rejected by the historical Buddha, along with the related monistic Hindu theology which held that "everything is a Oneness" (SN 12.48 Lokayatika Sutta). The historical Buddha also held that understanding and seeing the truth of non-self led to un-attachment, and hence to the cessation of suffering, while ignorance (avidyā) about the true nature of personality (prajña) led to further suffering and attachment.

=== Epistemology ===
All schools of Indian philosophy recognize various sets of valid justifications for knowledge (pramāṇa) and many see the Vedas as providing access to truth. The historical Buddha denied the authority of the Vedas, though, like his contemporaries, he affirmed the soteriological importance of holding the right view; that is, having a proper understanding of reality. However, this understanding was not conceived primarily as metaphysical and cosmological knowledge, but as a piece of knowledge into the arising and cessation of suffering in human experience. Therefore, the Buddha's epistemic project is different from that of modern philosophy; it is primarily a solution to the fundamental human spiritual/existential problem.

Gautama Buddha's logico-epistemology has been compared to empiricism, in the sense that it was based on the experience of the world through the senses. The Buddha taught that empirical observation through the six sense fields (āyatanā) was the proper way of verifying any knowledge claims. Some Buddhist texts go further, stating that "the All", or everything that exists (sabbam), are these six sense spheres (SN 35.23, Sabba Sutta) and that anyone who attempts to describe another "All" will be unable to do so because "it lies beyond range". This passage has been interpreted as suggesting that things in themselves, or noumena, lie beyond the limits of human knowledge (avisaya).

Furthermore, in the Kālāma Sutta the Buddha tells a group of confused villagers that the only proper reason for one's beliefs is verification in one's own personal experience (and the experience of the wise) and denies any verification which stems from a personal authority, sacred tradition (anussava), or any kind of rationalism which constructs metaphysical theories (takka). In the Tevijja Sutta (DN 13), the Buddha rejects the personal authority of Brahmins because none of them can prove they have had personal experience of Brahman, nor could any of them prove its existence. The Buddha also stressed that experience is the only criterion for verification of the truth in this passage from the Majjhima Nikāya (MN.I.265):

"Monks, do you only speak that which is known by yourselves seen by yourselves, found by yourselves?"
"Yes, we do, sir."
"Good, monks, That is how you have been instructed by me in this timeless doctrine which can be realized and verified, that leads to the goal and can be understood by those who are intelligent."

Furthermore, the Buddha's standard for personal verification was a pragmatic and salvific one, for the Buddha a belief counts as truth only if it leads to successful Buddhist practice (and hence, to the destruction of craving). In the "Discourse to Prince Abhaya" (MN.I.392–4) the Buddha states this pragmatic maxim by saying that a belief should only be accepted if it leads to wholesome consequences. Western scholars such as Mrs Rhys Davids and Vallée-Poussin interpreted this emphasis on practical consequences as a form of pragmatism. However, K. N. Jayatilleke argues the Buddha's epistemology can also be taken to be a form of correspondence theory (as per the Apannaka Sutta) with elements of coherentism, and that for the Buddha it is causally impossible for something which is false to lead to cessation of suffering and evil.

Gautama Buddha discouraged his disciples and early followers of Buddhism from indulging in intellectual disputation for its own sake, which is fruitless, and distracts one from the ultimate goals of awakening (bodhi) and liberation (mokṣa). Only philosophy and discussion which has pragmatic value for liberation from suffering is seen as important. According to the Pāli Canon, during his lifetime the Buddha remained silent when asked several metaphysical questions which he regarded as the basis for "unwise reflection". These "unanswered questions" (avyākṛta) regarded issues such as whether the universe is eternal or non-eternal (or whether it is finite or infinite), the unity or separation of the body and the self (ātman), the complete inexistence of a person after death and nirvāṇa, and others. In the Aggi-Vacchagotta Sutta, the historical Buddha stated that thinking about these imponderable issues led to "a thicket of views, a wilderness of views, a contortion of views, a writhing of views, a fetter of views".

This suspension of judgement has been interpreted as a way of prioritising the practical attainment of liberation over speculation about metaphysical questions. and bring about the danger of substituting the experience of liberation by a conceptual understanding of the doctrine or by religious faith. According to the Buddha, the Dharma is not an ultimate end in itself or an explanation of all metaphysical reality, but a pragmatic set of teachings. The Buddha used two parables to clarify this point, the 'Parable of the raft' and the Parable of the Poisoned Arrow. The Dharma is like a raft in the sense that it is only a pragmatic tool for attaining nirvana ("for the purpose of crossing over, not for the purpose of holding onto", MN 22); once one has done this, one can discard the raft. It is also like medicine, in that the particulars of how one was injured by a poisoned arrow (i.e. metaphysics, etc.) do not matter in the act of removing and curing the arrow wound itself (removing suffering).The metaphor of the Buddha as a physician reflects his emphasis on identifying and overcoming suffering rather than pursuing metaphysical speculation.

Having said this, it is still clear that resisting and even refuting a false or slanted doctrine can be useful to extricate the interlocutor, or oneself, from error; hence, to advance in the way of liberation. Witness the Buddha's confutation of several doctrines by Nigantha Nataputta and other purported sages which sometimes had large followings (e.g., Kula Sutta, Sankha Sutta, Brahmana Sutta). This shows that a virtuous and appropriate use of dialectics can take place. By implication, reasoning and argument shouldn't be disparaged by Buddhists.

After the Buddha's death, some Buddhists such as Dharmakirti went on to use the sayings of the Buddha as sound evidence equal to perception and inference. (Note: The Theravāda commentary, ascribed to Dhammapala, on the Nettipakaraṇa, says (Pāli pamāṇa is equivalent to Sanskrit pramāṇa): "na hi pāḷito aññaṃ pamāṇataraṃ atthi (quoted in Pāli Text Society edition of the Nettipakaraṇa, 1902, p. xi) which Nanamoli translates as: "for there is no other criterion beyond a text" (The Guide, Pāli Text Society, 1962, p. xi).)

=== Transcendence ===
Another interpretation holds that the Buddha avoided metaphysical explanations because ultimate reality and nirvana were considered beyond the limits of sensory experience and therefore language itself is a priori inadequate to explain it. Thus, the Buddha's silence does not indicate misology or disdain for philosophy. Rather, it indicates that he viewed the answers to these questions as not understandable by the unenlightened. Dependent arising provides a framework for analysis of reality that is not based on metaphysical assumptions regarding existence or non-existence, but instead on direct cognition of phenomena as they are presented to the mind in meditation.

The Buddha of the earliest Buddhists texts describes Dharma (in the sense of "truth") as "beyond reasoning" or "transcending logic", in the sense that reasoning is a subjectively introduced aspect of the way unenlightened humans perceive things, and the conceptual framework which underpins their cognitive process, rather than a feature of things as they really are. Going "beyond reasoning" means in this context penetrating the nature of reasoning from the inside, and removing the causes for experiencing any future stress as a result of it, rather than functioning outside the system as a whole.

=== Meta-ethics ===
The Buddha's ethics are based on the soteriological need to eliminate suffering and on the premise of the law of karma. Buddhist ethics have been termed eudaimonic (with their goal being well-being) and also compared to virtue ethics (this approach began with Damien Keown). Keown writes that Buddhist Nirvana is analogous to the Aristotelian Eudaimonia, and that Buddhist moral acts and virtues derive their value from how they lead us to or act as an aspect of the nirvanic life.

The Buddha outlined five precepts (no killing, stealing, sexual misconduct, lying, or drinking alcohol) which were to be followed by his disciples, lay and monastic. There are various reasons the Buddha gave as to why someone should be ethical.

First, the universe is structured in such a way that if someone intentionally commits a misdeed, a bad karmic fruit will be the result. Hence, from a pragmatic point of view, it is best to abstain from these negative actions which bring forth negative results. However, the important word here is intentionally: for the Buddha, karma is nothing else but intention/volition, and hence unintentionally harming someone does not create bad karmic results. Unlike the Jains who believed that karma was a quasi-physical element, for the Buddha karma was a volitional mental event, what Richard Gombrich calls "an ethicised consciousness".

This idea leads into the second moral justification of the Buddha: intentionally performing negative actions reinforces and propagates mental defilements which keep persons bound to the cycle of rebirth and interfere with the process of liberation, and hence intentionally performing good karmic actions is participating in mental purification which leads to nirvana, the highest happiness. This perspective sees immoral acts as unskillful (akusala) in our quest for happiness, and hence it is pragmatic to do good.

The third meta-ethical consideration takes the view of not-self and our natural desire to end our suffering to its logical conclusion. Since there is no self, there is no reason to prefer our own welfare over that of others because there is no ultimate grounding for the differentiation of "my" suffering and someone else's. Instead, an enlightened person would just work to end suffering tout court, without thinking of the conventional concept of persons. According to this argument, anyone who is selfish does so out of ignorance of the true nature of personal identity and irrationality.

== Buddhist schools and Abhidharma ==
The main Indian Buddhist philosophical schools practiced a form of analysis termed Abhidharma which sought to systematize the teachings of the early Buddhist discourses (sutras). Abhidharma analysis broke down human experience into momentary phenomenal events or occurrences called "dharmas". Dharmas are impermanent and dependent on other causal factors, they arise and pass as part of a web of other interconnected dharmas, and are never found alone. The Abhidharma schools held that the teachings of the Buddha in the sutras were merely conventional, while the Abhidharma analysis was ultimate truth (paramattha sacca), the way things really are when seen by an enlightened being. The Abhidharmic project has been likened as a form of phenomenology or process philosophy.

Abhidharma philosophers not only outlined what they believed to be an exhaustive listing of dharmas (Pali: dhammas), which are the ultimate phenomena, events or processes (and include physical and mental phenomena), but also the causal relations between them. In the Abhidharmic analysis, the only thing which is ultimately real is the interplay of dharmas in a causal stream; everything else is merely conceptual (paññatti) and nominal.

This view has been termed "mereological reductionism" by Mark Siderits because it holds that only impartite entities are real, not wholes. Abhidharmikas such as Vasubandhu argued that conventional things (tables, persons, etc.) "disappear under analysis" and that this analysis reveals only a causal stream of phenomenal events and their relations. The mainstream Abhidharmikas defended this view against their main Hindu rivals, the Nyaya school, who were substance theorists and posited the existence of universals. Some Abhidharmikas such as the Prajñaptivāda were also strict nominalists, and held that all things - even dharmas - were merely conceptual.

=== The Abhidharma schools ===
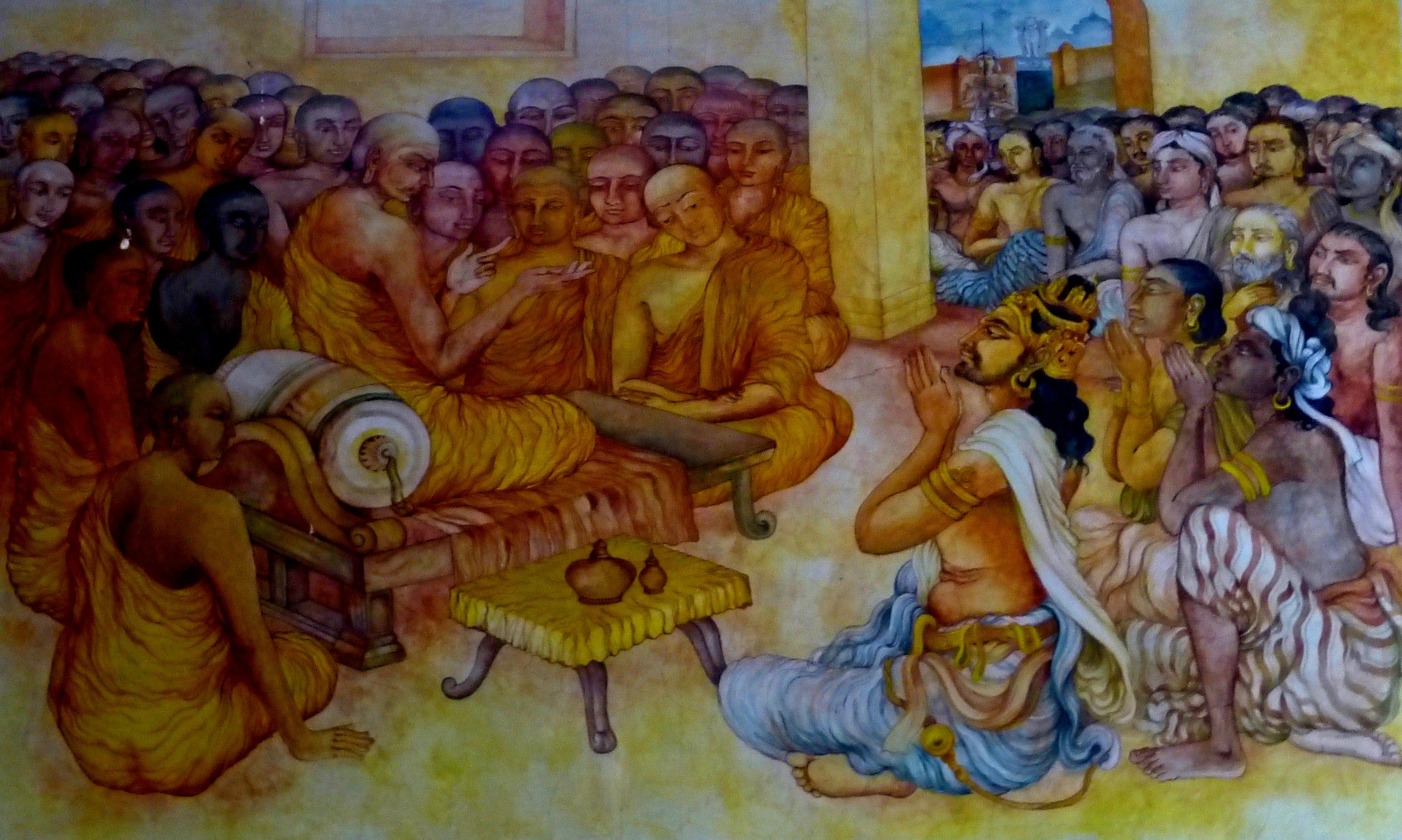
Indian Emperor Aśoka and the elder Moggaliputta-Tissa, who is seen as a key thinker of the Vibhajyavāda tradition (and thus, of Theravada).

An important Abhidhamma work from the Theravāda school is the Kathāvatthu ("Points of controversy"), attributed to the Indian scholar-monk Moggaliputta-Tissa (c. 327–247 BCE). This text is important because it attempts to refute several philosophical views which had developed after the death of the Buddha, especially the theory that 'all exists' (sarvāstivāda), the theory of momentariness (khāṇavāda) and the personalist view (pudgalavada). These were the major philosophical theories that divided the Buddhist Abhidharma schools in India.

After being brought to Sri Lanka in the first century BCE, the Pali language Theravada Abhidhamma tradition was heavily influenced by the works of Buddhaghosa (4-5th century AD), the most important philosopher and commentator of the Theravada school. The Theravada philosophical enterprise was mostly carried out in the genre of Atthakatha (commentaries) as well as sub-commentaries (tikas) on the classic Pali Abhidhamma texts. Abhidhamma study also included smaller doctrinal summaries and compendiums, like the Abhidhammattha-saṅgaha (The Compendium of Things contained in the Abhidhamma).

The Sarvāstivāda-Vaibhāṣika (sometimes just "Vaibhāṣika") was one of the major Buddhist philosophical schools in India, and they were so named because of their belief that dharmas exist in all three times: past, present and future. Though the Sarvāstivāda Abhidharma system began as a mere categorization of mental events, their philosophers and exegetes such as Dharmatrata and Katyāyāniputra, the compiler of the Mahāvibhāṣa ("Great Commentary"), eventually refined this system into a robust realism, which also included a type of essentialism or substance theory. This realism was based on the nature of dharmas, which was called svabhava ("self-nature" or "intrinsic existence"). Svabhava is a sort of essence, though it is not a completely independent essence, since all dharmas were said to be causally dependent. The Sarvāstivāda system extended this realism across time, effectively positing a type of eternalism with regards to time; hence, the name of their school means "the view that everything exists". Vaibhāṣika remained an influential school in North India during the medieval period. Perhaps the most influential figure in this tradition was the great scholar Saṃghabhadra. Another key figure was Śubhagupta (720–780), who was a Vaibhāṣika thinker within the epistemological (pramana) tradition.

Other Buddhist schools such as the Prajñaptivāda ("the nominalists"), as well as the Caitika Mahāsāṃghikas refused to accept the concept of svabhava. Thus, not all Abhidharma sources defend svabhava. For example, the main topic of the Tattvasiddhi Śāstra by Harivarman (3-4th century CE), an influential Abhidharma text, is the emptiness (shunyata) of dharmas. Indeed, this anti-essentialist nominalism was widespread among the Mahāsāṃghika sects. Another important feature of the Mahāsāṃghika tradition was its unique theory of consciousness. Many of the Mahāsāṃghika sub-schools defended a theory of self-awareness (svasaṃvedana) which held that consciousness can be simultaneously aware of itself as well as its intentional object. Some of these schools also held that the mind's nature (cittasvabhāva) is fundamentally pure (mulavisuddha), but it can be contaminated by adventitious defilements.

The Theravādins and other schools, such as the Sautrāntikas ("those who follow the sutras"), often attacked the theories of the Sarvāstivādins, especially their theory of time. A major figure in this argument was the scholar Vasubandhu, a Sarvāstivādin monk himself (who was also influenced by the critiques of the Sautrantika school), who critiqued the theory of all exists and argued for philosophical presentism in his comprehensive treatise, the Abhidharmakośa. This work is the major Abhidharma text used in Tibetan and East Asian Buddhism today. The Theravāda also holds that dharmas only exist in the present, and are thus also presentists.

The Theravāda presentation of Abhidharma is also not as concerned with ontology as the Sarvāstivāda view, but is more of a phenomenological schema. Hence the concept of svabhava (Pali: sabhava) for the Theravādins is more of a certain characteristic or dependent feature of a dharma, than any sort of essence or metaphysical grounding. As the Sinhalese scholar Y. Karunadasa writes, the Pali tradition only postulates sabhava "for the sake of definition and description." However, ultimately each dhamma (particular phenomenon) is not a singular independent existence. Thus, Karunadasa rejects the view that Theravada Abhidhamma defends an ontological pluralism (but it is also not monism either, since there is no single underlying ground of all things or metaphysical substratum). Instead they are merely processes that happen "due to the interplay of a multitude of conditions." Karunadasa also describes the Theravada system as a "critical realism" which sees the ultimate existents as the myriad irreducible dhammas, and which also accepts the existence of an external world with entities that truly exist independently of cognition (as opposed to Mahayana forms of idealism).

Another important theory held by some Sarvāstivādins, Theravādins and Sautrāntikas was the theory of "momentariness" (Skt., kṣāṇavāda, Pali, khāṇavāda). This theory held that dhammas only last for a minute moment (ksana) after they arise. The Sarvāstivādins saw these 'moments' in an atomistic way, as the smallest length of time possible (they also developed a material atomism). Reconciling this theory with their eternalism regarding time was a major philosophical project of the Sarvāstivāda. The Theravādins initially rejected this theory, as evidenced by the Khaṇikakathā of the Kathavatthu which attempts to refute the doctrine that "all phenomena (dhamma) are as momentary as a single mental entity." However, momentariness with regards to mental dhammas (but not physical or rūpa dhammas) was later adopted by the Sri Lankan Theravādins, and it is possible that it was first introduced by the scholar Buddhagosa.

All Abhidharma schools also developed complex theories of causation and conditionality to explain how dharmas interacted with each other. Another major philosophical project of the Abhidharma schools was the explanation of perception. Some schools such as the Sarvastivadins explained perception as a type of phenomenalist realism while others such as the Sautrantikas preferred representationalism and held that we only perceive objects indirectly. The major argument used for this view by the Sautrāntikas was the "time-lag argument." According to Mark Siderits: "The basic idea behind the argument is that since there is always a tiny gap between when the sense comes in contact with the external object and when there is sensory awareness, what we are aware of can't be the external object that the senses were in contact with, since it no longer exists." This is related to the theory of extreme momentariness.

One major philosophical view which was rejected by all the schools mentioned above was the view held by the Pudgalavadin or 'personalist' schools. They seemed to have held that there was a sort of 'personhood' in some ultimately real sense which was not reducible to the five aggregates. This controversial claim was in contrast to the other Buddhists of the time who held that a personality was a mere conceptual construction (prajñapti) and only conventionally real.

== Indian Mahāyāna philosophy ==
From about the 1st century BCE, a new textual tradition began to arise in Indian Buddhist thought called Mahāyāna (Great Vehicle), which would slowly come to dominate Indian Buddhist philosophy. During the medieval period of Indian history, Buddhist philosophy thrived in large monastery complexes such as Nalanda, Vikramasila, and Vallabhi. These institutions became major centers of philosophical learning in North India (where both Buddhist and also non-Buddhist thought was studied and debated). Mahāyāna philosophers continued the philosophical projects of Abhidharma, while at the same time critiquing them and introducing many new concepts and ideas. Since the Mahāyāna held to the pragmatic concept of truth, which states that doctrines are regarded as conditionally "true" in the sense of being spiritually beneficial, these new theories and practices were seen as "skillful means" (upāya) conductive to enlightenment.

The Mahāyāna also promoted the Bodhisattva ideal, which included an attitude of benevolence, wisdom, compassion, generosity, and loving-kindness for all sentient beings. The Bodhisattva is someone who chooses to remain in the cycle of birth, death, and rebirth in order to help and benefit all other beings who are suffering, until their final attainment of Buddhahood.

Major Mahayana philosophical schools and traditions include the Prajñaparamita, Mādhyamaka, Yogācāra, Tathagatagarbha, the epistemological school of Dignaga, and in China the Huayan, Tiantai, and Zen schools.

=== Prajñāpāramitā and Mādhyamaka ===
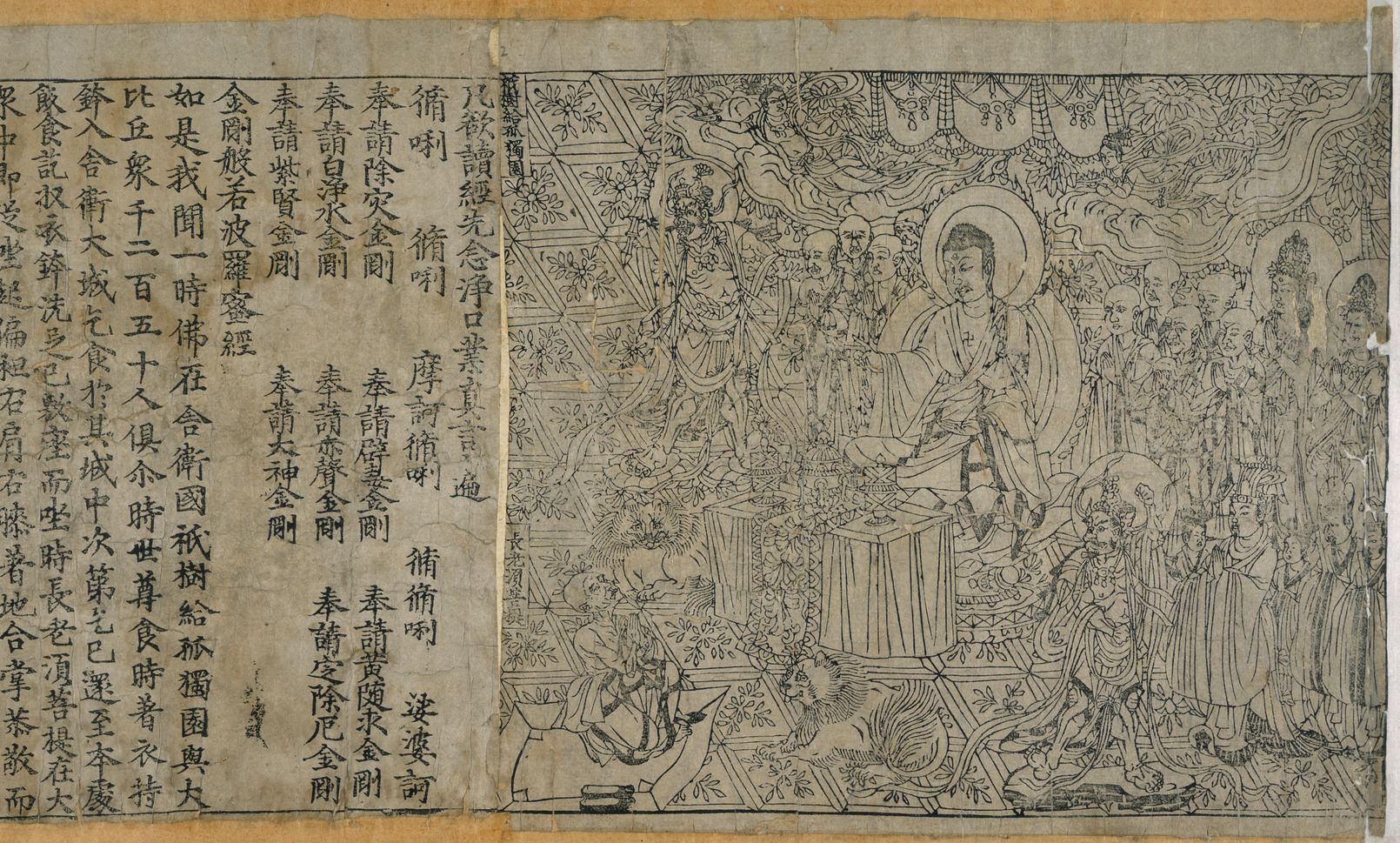
The world's earliest printed book is a Chinese translation of the Vajracchedikā Prajñāpāramitā Sūtra ("Diamond-Cutter Sūtra") from Dunhuang (c. 868 CE).

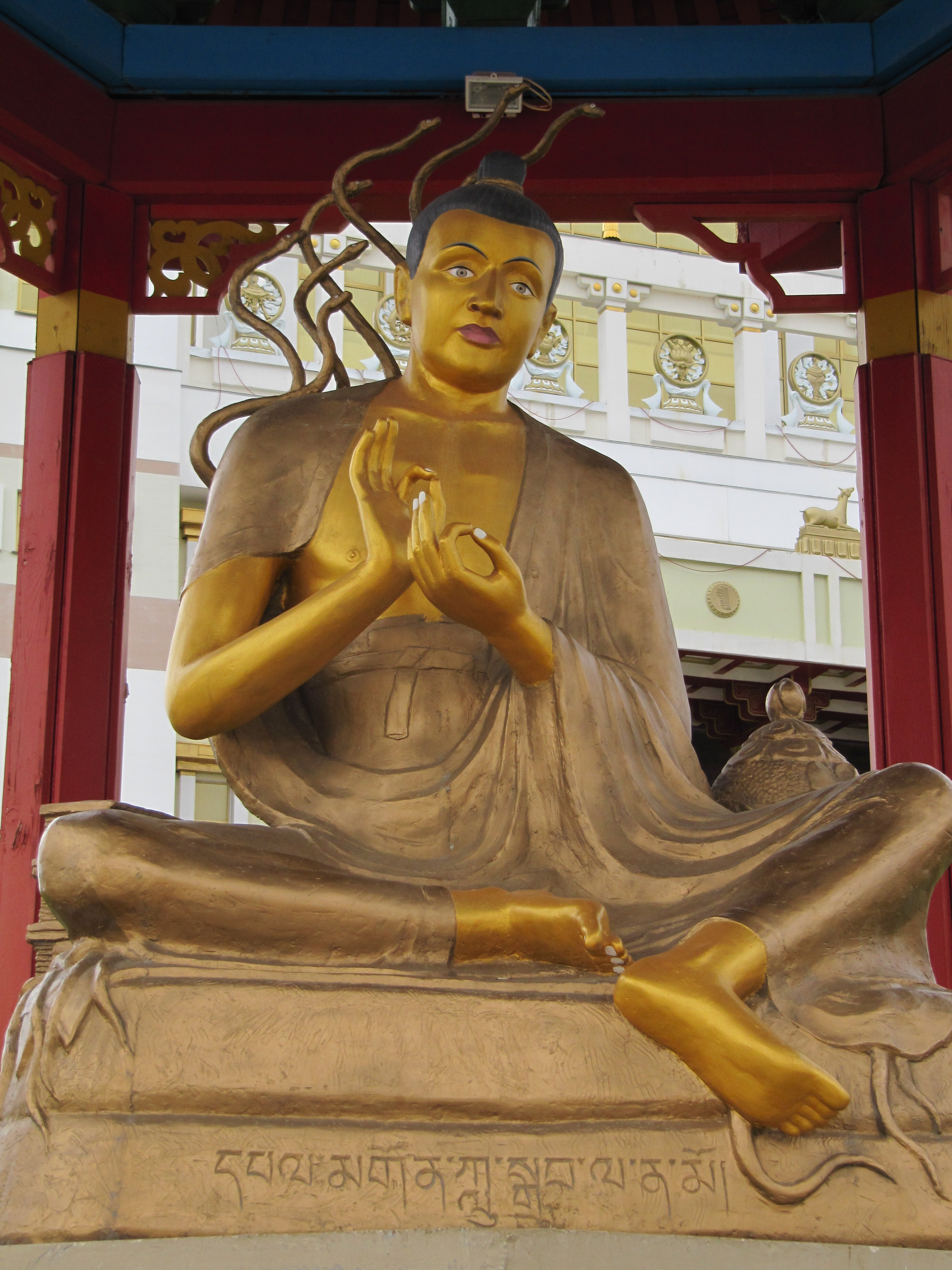
Nagarjuna, protected by the Nāgas (snake spirits) who are said to be the guardians of the Prajñāpāramitā Sūtras.

The earliest Prajñāpāramitā Sūtras ("Perfection of Wisdom", c. 1st century BCE) emphasize the emptiness (śūnyatā) of all conditioned and unconditioned phenomena (dharma). It is thus a radical global nominalism and anti-essentialism, which sees all things as illusions and all of reality as a dreamlike appearance without any fundamental essence. Prajñāpāramitā is said to be a transcendent spiritual knowledge of the nature of ultimate reality, which is empty of any essence or foundation, like a universal mirage.

Thus, the Diamond Sutra (Vajracchedikā Prajñāpāramitā Sūtra) states:

All conditioned phenomena

Are like a dream, an illusion, a bubble, a shadow,
Like dew or a flash of lightning;

Thus we shall perceive them.

The Heart Sutra famously affirms the emptiness of all phenomena:

Oh, Sariputra, form does not differ from emptiness, and emptiness does not differ from form.
Form is emptiness and emptiness is form; the same is true for feelings, perceptions, volitions, and consciousness.

The Prajñāpāramitā sources also note that this applies to every single phenomenon, even Buddhahood. The goal of the Buddhist aspirant in the Prajñāpāramitā texts is to awaken to the perfection of wisdom ("prajñāpāramitā"), a non-conceptual transcendent wisdom that knows the emptiness of all things while not being attached to anything (including the very idea of emptiness itself or perfect wisdom).

The Prajñāpāramitā teachings are associated with the work of the Buddhist philosopher Nāgārjuna (c. 150 – c. 250 CE) and the Mādhyamaka ("Middle Way") school. Nāgārjuna was one of the most influential Indian Mahāyāna thinkers. He gave the classical arguments for the empty nature of all dharmas and attacked the essentialism found in various Abhidharma schools (and also in Hindu philosophy) in his magnum opus, The Root Verses on the Middle Way (Mūlamadhyamakakārikā). In the Mūlamadhyamakakārikā, Nagarjuna relies on reductio ad absurdum arguments to refute various theories which assume svabhāva (an inherent essence or substantial being), dravya (substances or entity), or any theory of existence (bhāva). In this work, he covers topics such as causation, motion, and the sense faculties.

Nāgārjuna asserted a direct connection between, even identity of, dependent origination (pratītyasamutpāda), emptiness (śūnyatā), and non-self (anattā). He pointed out that implicit in the early Buddhist concept of dependent origination is the lack of a permanent, unchanging self underlying the participants in origination, so that they have no independent existence, a state identified as being empty (svabhāva śūnyam: i.e., emptiness of a nature or essence).

Later philosophers of the Mādhyamaka school built upon Nāgārjuna's analysis and defended the Mādhyamaka view against their opponents. These included Āryadeva (3rd century CE), Nāgārjuna's pupil; Candrakīrti (600–c. 650), who wrote an important commentary on the Mūlamadhyamakakārikā; and Shantideva (8th century), who is regarded as the key Mahāyāna ethicist.

The commentator Buddhapālita (c. 470–550) has been understood as the originator of the Prasaṅgika approach which is based on critiquing essentialism only through reductio arguments. He was criticized by Bhāvaviveka (c. 500 – c. 578), who argued for the use of properly logical syllogisms to positively argue for emptiness (instead of just refuting the theories of others). These two approaches were later termed the Prasaṅgika and Svatantrika approaches to Mādhyamaka philosophy by Tibetan Buddhist philosophers and commentators.

Influenced by the work of Dignaga, Bhāvaviveka's Mādhyamaka philosophy makes use of Buddhist epistemology. Candrakīrti, on the other hand, critiqued Bhāvaviveka's adoption of the epistemological (pramana) tradition on the grounds that it contained subtle essentialism. He quotes Nagarjuna's famous statement in the Vigrahavyavartani which says "I have no thesis" for his rejection of positive epistemic Madhyamaka statements. Candrakīrti held that a true Madhyamika could only use "consequence" (prasanga), in which one points out the inconsistencies of their opponent's position without asserting an "autonomous inference" (svatantra), for no such inference can be ultimately true from the point of view of Madhyamaka.

In China, the Madhyamaka school (known as Sānlùn) was founded by Kumārajīva (344–413 CE), who translated the works of Nagarjuna to Chinese. Other Chinese Madhymakas include Kumārajīva's pupil Sengzhao, Jizang (549–623), who wrote over 50 works on Madhyamaka, and Hyegwan, a Korean monk who brought Madhyamaka teachings to Japan.

=== Yogācāra ===
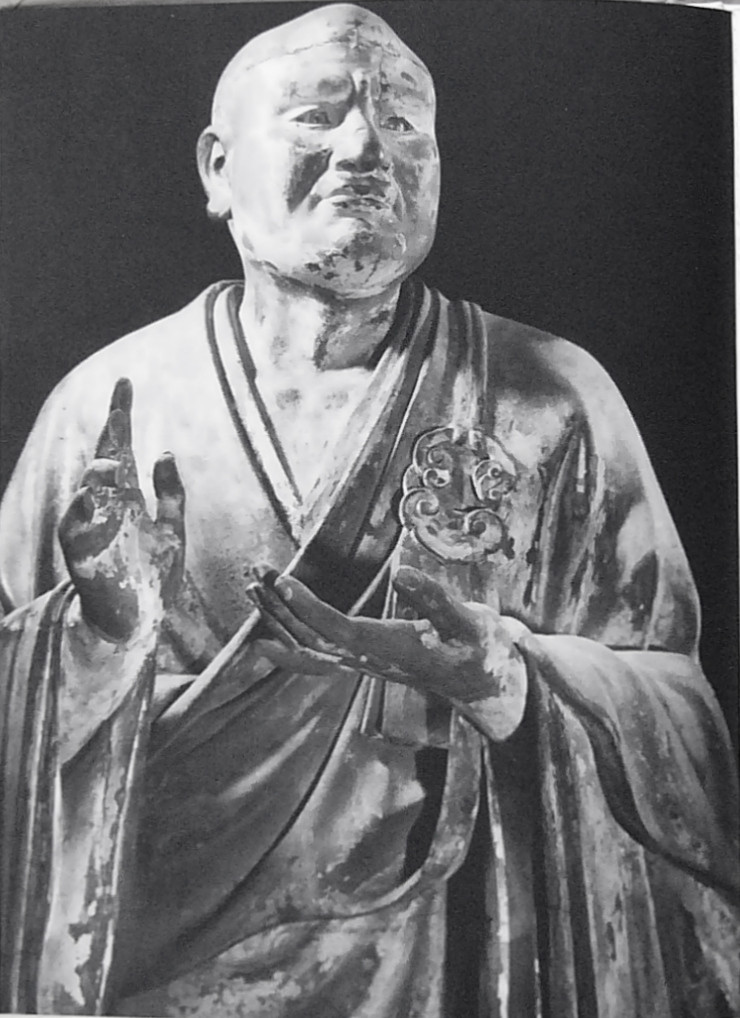
Vasubandhu wrote in defense of Vijñapti-matra (appearance only) as well as writing a massive work on Abhidharma, the Abhidharmakosa.

The Yogācāra school (Yoga practice) was a Buddhist philosophical tradition which arose in between the 2nd century CE and the 4th century CE and is associated with the philosophers and brothers Asanga and Vasubandhu and with various sutras such as the Sandhinirmocana Sutra and the Lankavatara Sutra. The central feature of Yogācāra thought is the concept of vijñapti-mātra, often translated as "impressions only" or "appearance only". This has been interpreted as a form of Idealism or as a form of Phenomenology. Other names for the Yogācāra school are 'vijñanavada' (the doctrine of consciousness) and 'cittamatra' (mind-only).

Yogācāra thinkers like Vasubandhu argued against the existence of external objects by pointing out that we only ever have access to our own mental impressions, and hence our inference of the existence of external objects is based on faulty logic. Vasubandhu's Triṃśikā-vijñaptimātratā (The Proof that There Are Only Impressions in Thirty Verses), begins thus:

I. This [world] is nothing but impressions, since it manifests itself as an unreal object, Just like the case of those with cataracts seeing unreal hairs in the moon and the like.

According to Vasubandhu then, all our experiences are like seeing hairs on the moon when we have cataracts, that is, we project our mental images into something "out there" when there are no such things. Vasubandhu then goes on to use the dream argument to argue that mental impressions do not require external objects to (1) seem to be spatio-temporally located, (2) to seem to have an inter-subjective quality, and (3) to seem to operate by causal laws. The fact that purely mental events can have causal efficacy and be intersubjective is proved by the event of a wet dream and by the mass or shared hallucinations created by the karma of certain types of beings. After having argued that impressions-only is a theory that can explain our everyday experience, Vasubandhu then appeals to parsimony - since we do not need the concept of external objects to explain reality, then we can do away with those superfluous concepts altogether as they are most likely just mentally superimposed on our concepts of reality by the mind. Yogācārins like Vasubandhu also attacked the realist theories of Buddhist atomism and the Abhidharma theory of svabhava. He argued that atoms, as conceived by the atomists (un-divisible entities), would not be able to come together to form larger aggregate entities, and hence that they were illogical concepts.

Inter-subjective reality for Vasubandhu is then the causal interaction between various mental streams and their karma, and does not include any external physical objects. The soteriological importance of this theory is that, by removing the concept of an external world, it also weakens the 'internal' sense of self as an observer which is supposed to be separate from the external world. To dissolve the dualism of inner and outer is also to dissolve the sense of self and other. The later Yogacara commentator Sthiramati explains this thus:

There is a grasper if there is something to be grasped, but not in the absence of what is to be grasped. Where there is nothing to be grasped, the absence of a grasper also follows, there is not just the absence of the thing to be grasped. Thus there arises the extra-mundane non-conceptual cognition that is alike without object and without cognizer.

Apart from its defense of an idealistic metaphysics and its attacks on realism, Yogācāra sources also developed a new theory of mind, based on the Eight Consciousnesses, which includes the innovative doctrine of the subliminal storehouse consciousness (Skt: ālayavijñāna).

Yogācāra thinkers also developed a positive account of ultimate reality based on three basic modes or "natures" (svabhāva). This metaphysical doctrine is central to their view of the ultimate and to their understanding of the doctrine of emptiness (śūnyatā).

=== The Dignāga-Dharmakīrti tradition ===
Dignāga (c. 480–540) and Dharmakīrti (c. 6-7th century) were Buddhist philosophers who developed a system of epistemology (pramana) and logic in their debates with the Brahminical philosophers in order to defend Buddhist doctrine. This tradition is called "those who follow reasoning" (Tibetan: rigs pa rjes su 'brang ba); in modern literature, it is sometimes known by the Sanskrit "pramāṇavāda", or "the Epistemological School." They were associated with the Yogacara and Sautrantika schools, and defended theories held by both of these schools.

Dignāga's influence was profound and led to an "epistemological turn" among all Buddhists and also all Sanskrit language philosophers in India after his death. In the centuries following Dignāga's work, Sanskrit philosophers became much more focused on defending all of their propositions with fully developed theories of knowledge.

The "School of Dignāga" includes later philosophers and commentators like Santabhadra, Dharmottara (8th century), Prajñakaragupta (740–800 C.E.), Jñanasrimitra (975–1025), Ratnakīrti (11th century) and Śaṅkaranandana (fl. c. 9th or 10th century). The epistemology they developed defends the view that there are only two 'instruments of knowledge' or 'valid cognitions' (pramana): "perception" (pratyaksa) and "inference" (anumāṇa). Perception is a non-conceptual awareness of particulars which is bound by causality, while inference is reasonable, linguistic and conceptual.

These Buddhist philosophers argued in favor of the theory of momentariness, the Yogācāra "awareness only" view, the reality of particulars (svalakṣaṇa), atomism, nominalism and the self-reflexive nature of consciousness (svasaṃvedana). They attacked Hindu theories of God (Isvara), universals, the authority of the Vedas, and the existence of a permanent soul (atman).

=== Later Yogācāra developments ===
After the time of Asanga and Vasubandhu, the Yogācāra school developed in different directions. One branch focused on epistemology (this would become the school of Dignaga). Another branch focused on expanding the Yogācāra's metaphysics and philosophy. This latter tradition includes figures like Dharmapala of Nalanda, Sthiramati, Chandragomin (who was known to have debated the Madhyamaka thinker Candrakirti), and Śīlabhadra (a top scholar at Nalanda). Yogācārins such as Paramartha and Guṇabhadra brought the school to China and translated Yogacara works there, where it is known as Wéishí-zōng or Fǎxiàng-zōng. An important contribution to East Asian Yogācāra is Xuanzang's Cheng Weishi Lun, or "Discourse on the Establishment of Consciousness Only".

A later development is the rise of a syncretic tradition of Yogācāra-tathāgatagarbha thought. This group adopted the doctrine of tathāgatagarbha (the buddha-womb, buddha-source, or "buddha-within") found in various tathāgatagarbha sutras. This hybrid school eventually went on to equate the tathāgatagarbha with the pure aspect of the storehouse consciousness. Some key sources of this school are the Laṅkāvatāra Sūtra, Ratnagotravibhāga (Uttaratantra), and in China, the influential Mahayana Awakening of Faith treatise. One key figure of this tradition was Paramārtha, an Indian monk who was an important translator in China. He promoted a new theory that said there was a "stainless consciousness" (amala-vijñāna, a pure wisdom within all beings), which he equated with the Buddha-nature (tathāgatagārbha). This synthetic tradition also became important in later Indian Buddhism, where the Ratnagotravibhāga became the key text.

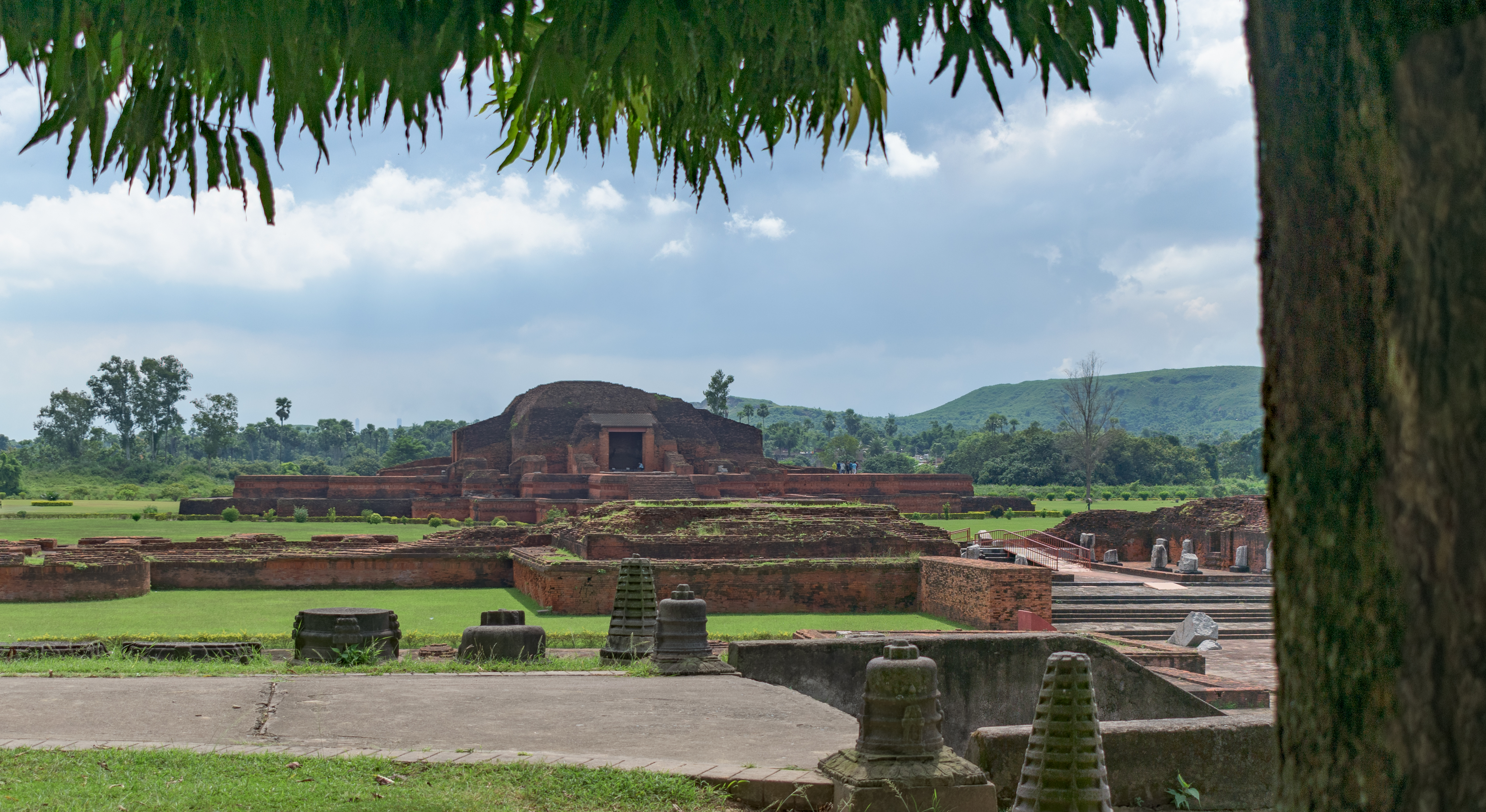
Site of Vikramaśīla university (today in Bhagalpur district, Bihar), an important center of learning for late Indian Yogācārins. Great panditas like Jñānaśrīmitra and Ratnākaraśānti were "gate-scholars" in this university.

Another later development was the synthesis of Yogācāra and Mādhyamaka philosophies. Jñānagarbha (8th century) and his student Śāntarakṣita (725–788) brought together Yogācāra, Mādhyamaka, and the Dignaga school of epistemology into a philosophical synthesis known as the Yogācāra-Svatantrika-Mādhyamika. Śāntarakṣita was also instrumental in the introduction of Buddhism and the Sarvastivadin monastic ordination lineage to Tibet, which was conducted at Samye. Śāntarakṣita's disciples included Haribhadra and Kamalaśīla. This philosophical tradition is influential in Tibetan Buddhist thought.

Perhaps the most important debate among late Yogācāra philosophers was the debate between alikākāravāda (Tib. rnam rdzun pa, False Aspectarians, also known as Nirākāravāda) and Satyākāravāda (rnam bden pa, True Aspectarians, also known as sākāravāda). The crux of the debate was the question of whether mental appearances, images or "aspects" (ākāra) are true (satya) or false (alika). The Satyākāravāda camp, defended by scholars like Prajñakaragupta (ca. 8th–9th century), and Jñānaśrīmitra (ca. 980–1040), held that images in consciousness have a real existence, since they arise from a real consciousness. Meanwhile, Alikākāravāda defenders like Sthiramati and Ratnākaraśānti (ca. 970–1045) argued that mental appearances do not really exist, and are false (alīka) or illusory. For these thinkers, the only thing which is real is a pure self-aware consciousness which is contentless (nirākāra, "without images").

=== Buddha-nature thought ===
The tathāgathagarbha sutras, in a departure from mainstream Buddhist language, insist that there is a real potential for awakening is inherent to every sentient being. They marked a shift from a largely apophatic (negative) method within Buddhism to a decidedly more cataphatic (positive) mode. The main topic of this genre of literature is the tathāgata-garbha, which can mean the womb or embryo of a Tathāgata (i.e. a Buddha) and is what allows someone to become a Buddha. Another similar term used for this idea is buddhadhātu (buddha-nature or source of the Buddhas).

Prior to the period of these scriptures, Mahāyāna metaphysics had been dominated by teachings on emptiness. The language used by this approach is primarily negative, and the buddha-nature literature can be seen as an attempt to state orthodox Buddhist teachings of dependent origination using positive language instead, to prevent people from being turned away from Buddhism by a false impression of nihilism. In these sutras, the perfection of the wisdom of not-self is stated to be the true self (atman). The word "self" (atman) is used in a way idiosyncratic to these sutras; the "true self" is described as the perfection of the wisdom of not-self in the Buddha-Nature Treatise (Fóxìng lùn, 佛性論, T. 1610) of Paramārtha, for example. The ultimate goal of the path is then characterized using a range of positive language that had been used previously in Indian philosophy by essentialist philosophers, but which was now adapted to describe the positive realities of Buddhahood.

Perhaps the most influential source in the Indian tradition for this teaching is the Ratnagotravibhāga (5th century CE). This śāstra brought together all the major themes of the tathāgatagārbha theory into a single treatise. The Ratnagotravibhāga sees the tathāgatagarbha as being an inherent nature in all things which is omnipresent, all-pervasive, non-conceptual, free of suffering and inherently blissful. It also describes buddha nature as "the intrinsically stainless nature of the mind" (cittaprakṛtivaimalya). Indeed, in many later Indian sources, the tathāgathagarbha teachings also come to be identified with the similar doctrine of the luminous mind (prabhasvara-citta). This ancient idea holds that the mind is inherently pure, and that defilements are only adventitious. In the Ratnagotravibhāga, this originally pure (prakṛtipariśuddha) nature (i.e. the fully purified buddha-nature) is further described through numerous terms such as: unconditioned (asaṃskṛta), unborn (ajāta), unarisen (anutpanna), eternal (nitya), changeless (dhruva), and permanent (śāśvata).

According to some scholars, tathāgatagarbha does not represent a substantial self; rather, it is a positive language expression of emptiness and represents the potentiality to realize Buddhahood through Buddhist practices. In this interpretation, the intention of the teaching of tathāgatagarbha is soteriological rather than metaphysical.

== Vajrayāna Buddhism ==
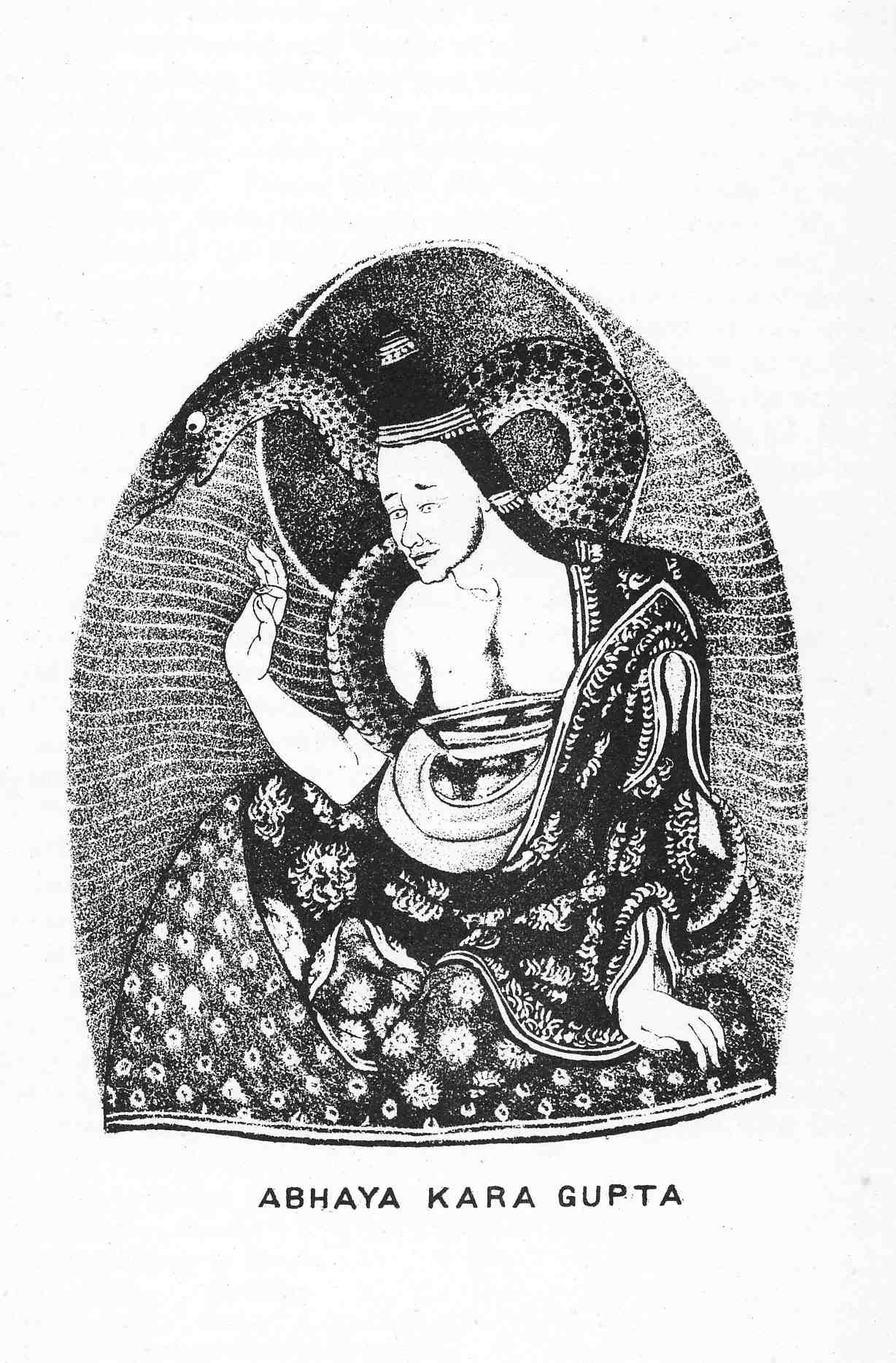
Abhayākaragupta, one of "the last great masters" of Indian Buddhism (Kapstein).

Vajrayāna (also Mantrayāna, Secret Mantra, Tantrayāna, and Esoteric Buddhism) is a Mahayana Buddhist tradition associated with a group of texts known as the Buddhist Tantras which had developed into a major force in India by the eighth century. By this time Indian Tantric scholars were developing philosophical defenses, hermeneutics and explanations of the Buddhist tantric systems, especially through commentaries on key tantras such as the Guhyasamāja Tantra, Mahavairocana sutra, and the Guhyagarbha Tantra.

While the view of the Vajrayāna was based on the earlier Madhyamaka, Yogacara and Buddha-nature theories, it saw itself as being a faster vehicle to liberation containing many skillful methods (upaya) of tantric ritual. The need for an explication and defense of the Tantras arose out of the unusual nature of the rituals associated with them, which included the use of secret mantras, alcohol, sexual yoga, complex visualizations of mandalas filled with wrathful deities and other practices which were discordant with or at least novel in comparison to traditional Buddhist practice.

The Guhyasamāja Tantra, for example, states: "you should kill living beings, speak lying words, take things that are not given and have sex with many women". Other features of tantra included a focus on the physical body as the means to liberation, and a reaffirmation of feminine elements, feminine deities and a positive view of sexuality.

The defense of these tantric practices is based on the theory of transformation which states that negative mental factors and physical actions can be cultivated and transformed in a ritual setting. The Hevajra tantra states:

Those things by which evil men are bound, others turn into means and gain thereby release from the bonds of existence. By passion the world is bound, by passion too it is released, but by heretical Buddhists, this practice of reversals is not known.

Another hermeneutic of Buddhist Tantric commentaries such as the Vimalaprabha (Stainless Light) of Pundarika (a commentary on the Kalacakra Tantra) is one of interpreting taboo or unethical statements in the Tantras as metaphorical statements about tantric practice and physiology. For example, in the Vimalaprabha, "killing living beings" refers to stopping the prana at the top of the head. In the Tantric Candrakirti's Pradipoddyotana, a commentary to the Guhyasamaja Tantra, killing living beings is glossed as "making them void" by means of a "special samadhi" which according to Bus-ton is associated with completion stage tantric practice.

Douglas Duckworth notes that Vajrayāna philosophical outlook is one of embodiment, which sees the physical and cosmological body as already containing wisdom and divinity. Liberation (nirvana) and Buddhahood are not seen as something outside the body, or an event in the future, but as imminently present and accessible right now through unique tantric practices like deity yoga. Hence, Vajrayāna is also called the "resultant vehicle", that is to say, it is the spiritual vehicle that relies on the immanent nature of the result of practice (liberation), which is already present in all beings. Duckworth names the philosophical view of Vajrayāna as a form of pantheism, by which he means the belief that every existing entity is in some sense divine and that all things express some form of unity.

Major Indian Tantric Buddhist philosophers such as Buddhaguhya, Padmavajra (author of the Guhyasiddhi commentary), Nagarjuna (the 7th-century disciple of Saraha), Indrabhuti (author of the Jñānasiddhi), Anangavajra, Dombiheruka, Durjayacandra, Ratnākaraśānti and Abhayakaragupta wrote tantric texts and commentaries systematizing the tradition.

Others such as Vajrabodhi and Śubhakarasiṃha brought tantra to Tang China (716 to 720), and tantric philosophy continued to be developed in Chinese and Japanese by thinkers such as Yi Xing (683–727) and Kūkai (774– 835).

In Tibet, philosophers such as Sakya Pandita (1182-28–1251), Longchenpa (1308–1364) and Tsongkhapa (1357–1419) continued the tradition of Buddhist Tantric philosophy in Classical Tibetan.

== Tibetan Buddhist philosophy ==
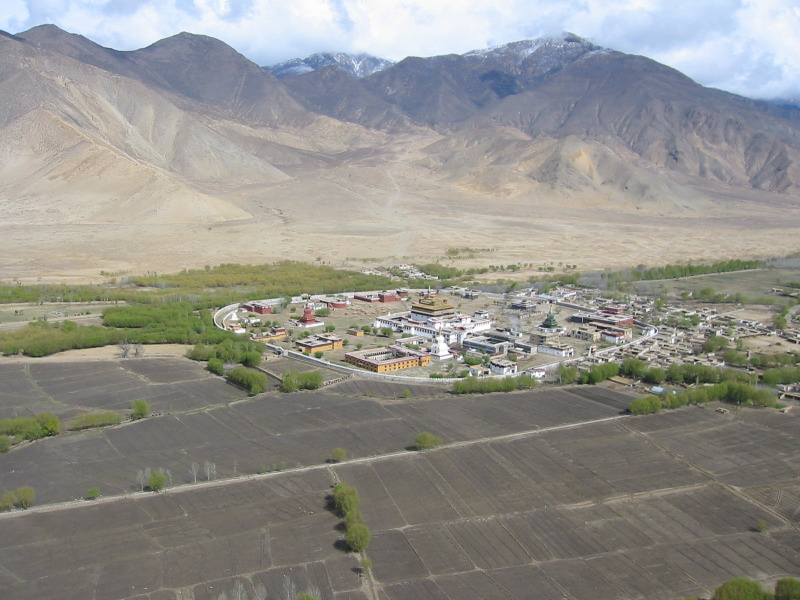
Samye was the first Buddhist monastery built in Tibet (c. 775–779).

Tibetan Buddhist philosophy is mainly a continuation and refinement of the Indian Mahayana philosophical traditions. The initial efforts of Śāntarakṣita and Kamalaśīla brought their eclectic scholarly tradition to Tibet.

The initial work of early Tibetan Buddhist philosophers was in the translation of classical Indian philosophical treatises and the writing of commentaries. This initial period is from the 8th to the 10th century. Early Tibetan commentator-philosophers were heavily influenced by the work of Dharmakirti and these include Ngok Loden Sherab (1059–1109) and Chaba Chökyi Senge (1182–1251). Their works are now lost.

The 12th and 13th centuries saw the translation of the works of Chandrakirti, the promulgation of his views in Tibet by scholars such as Patsab Nyima Drakpa, Kanakavarman and Jayananda (12th century) and the development of the Tibetan debate between the prasangika and svatantrika views which continues to this day among Tibetan Buddhist schools. The main disagreement between these views is the use of reasoned argument. For Śāntarakṣita's school, reason is useful in establishing arguments that lead one to a correct understanding of emptiness. Then, through the use of meditation, one can reach non-conceptual gnosis that does not rely on reason. However, Chandrakirti rejects this idea, because meditation on emptiness cannot possibly involve any object. Reason's role for him is purely negative. Reason is used to negate any essentialist view, and then eventually reason must also negate itself, along with any conceptual proliferation (prapañca).

Another very influential figure from this early period is Mabja Jangchub Tsöndrü (d. 1185), who wrote an important commentary on Nagarjuna's Mūlamadhyamakakārikā. Mabja was studied under the Dharmakirtian Chaba and also the Candrakirti scholar Patsab. His work shows an attempt to steer a middle course between their views, he affirms the conventional usefulness of pramāṇa epistemology, but also accepts Candrakirti's prasangika views. Mabja's Madhyamaka scholarship was very influential on later Tibetan Madhyamikas such as Longchenpa, Tsongkhapa, Gorampa, and Mikyö Dorje.

There are various Tibetan Buddhist schools or monastic orders. According to Georges B.J. Dreyfus, within Tibetan thought, the Sakya school holds a mostly anti-realist philosophical position (which sees saṁvṛtisatya / conventional truth as an illusion), while the Gelug school tends to defend a form of realism (which accepts that conventional truth is in some sense real and true, yet dependently originated). The Kagyu and Nyingma schools also tend to follow Sakya anti-realism (with some differences).

=== Shentong and Buddha nature ===
The 14th century saw increasing interest in the Buddha nature texts and doctrines. This can be seen in the work of the third Kagyu Karmapa Rangjung Dorje (1284–1339), especially his treatise "Profound Inner Meaning". This treatise describes ultimate nature or suchness as Buddha nature which is the basis for nirvana and samsara, radiant in nature and empty in essence, surpassing thought.

One of the most important theoriests of buddha-nature in Tibet was the scholar-yogi Dölpopa Shérap Gyeltsen (c. 1292–1361). A figure of the Jonang school, Dölpopa developed a view called shentong (Wylie: gzhan stong, 'other emptiness'), based on earlier Yogacara and Buddha-nature ideas present in Indian sources (including the buddha-nature literature, the Kālacakratantra and the works of Ratnākaraśānti). The shentong view holds that Buddhahood is already immanent in all living beings as an eternal and all-pervaside non-dual wisdom he termed "all-basis wisdom" or "gnosis of the ground of all" (Tib. kun gzhi ye shes, Skt. ālaya-jñāna). This view holds that all relative phenomena are empty of inherent existence, but that the ultimate reality, the buddha-wisdom (buddha jñana) is not empty of its own inherent existence.

According to Dölpopa, all beings are said to have the Buddha nature, the non-dual wisdom which is real, unchanging, permanent, non-conditioned, eternal, blissful and compassionate. This ultimate buddha wisdom is "uncreated and indestructible, unconditioned and beyond the chain of dependent origination" and is the basis for both samsara and nirvana. Dolpopa's shentong view also taught that ultimate reality was truly a "Great Self" or "Supreme Self" referring to works such as the Mahāyāna Mahāparinirvāṇa Sūtra, the Aṅgulimālīya Sūtra and the Śrīmālādevī Siṃhanāda Sūtra.

The shentong view had an influence on philosophers of other schools, such as Nyingma and Kagyu thinkers, and was also widely criticized in some circles as being similar to the Hindu notions of Atman. The Shentong philosophy was also expounded in Tibet and Mongolia by the later Jonang scholar Tāranātha (1575–1634) and numerous later figures of the Jonang tradition. In the late 17th century, the Jonang order and its teachings came under attack by the 5th Dalai Lama, who converted the majority of their monasteries in Tibet to the Gelug order, although several survived in secret.

=== Gelug ===
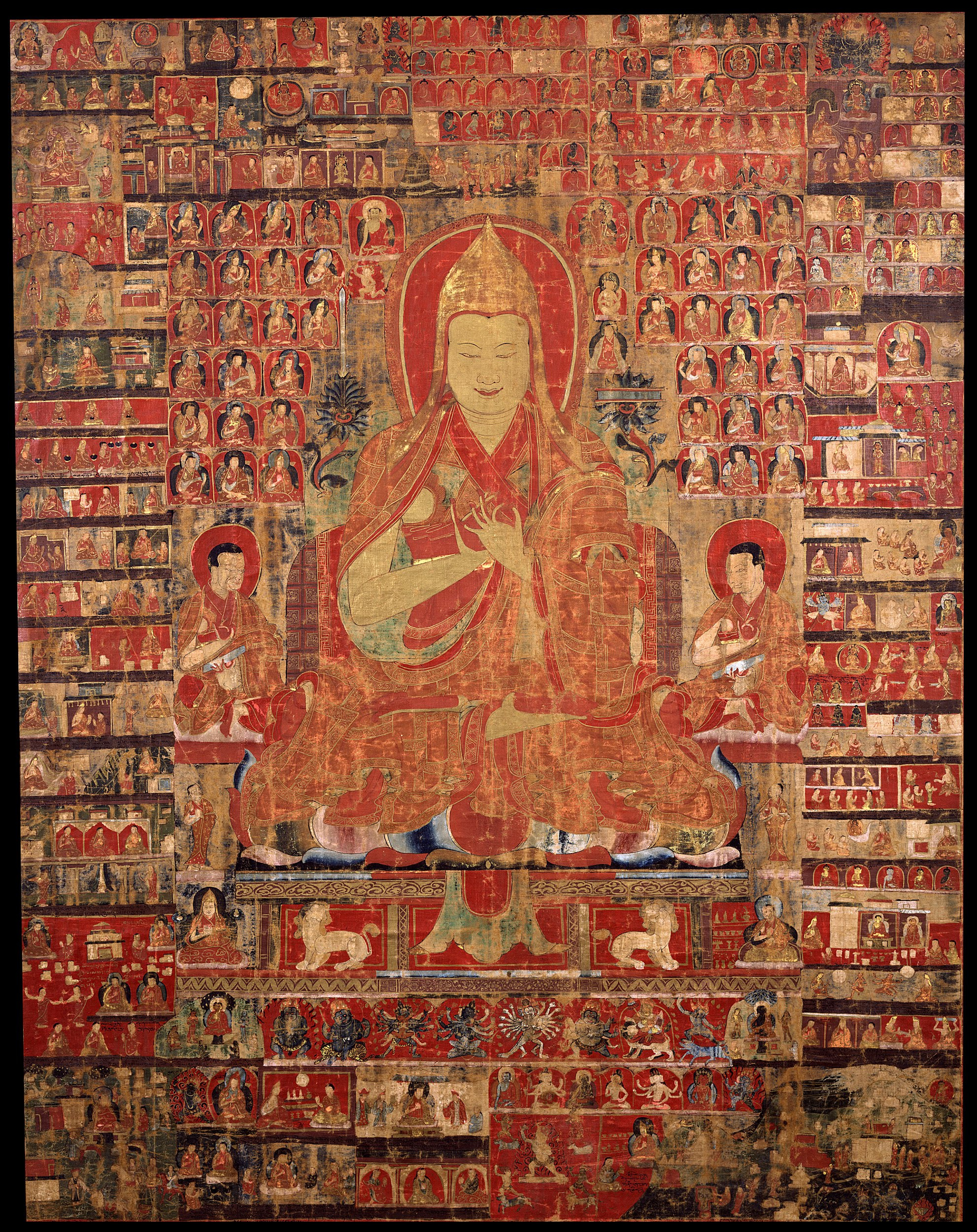
Tsongkapa, 15th-century painting, Rubin Museum of Art

Je Tsongkhapa (Dzong-ka-ba) (1357–1419) founded the Gelug school of Tibetan Buddhism, which came to dominate the country through the office of the Dalai Lama and is the major defender of the Prasaṅgika Madhyamaka view. His work is influenced by the philosophy of Candrakirti and Dharmakirti. Tsongkhapa's magnum opus is The Ocean of Reasoning, a Commentary on Nagarjuna's Mulamadhyamakakarika. Gelug philosophy is based upon the study of Madhyamaka texts and Tsongkhapa's works as well as formal debate (rtsod pa).

Tsongkhapa defended Prasangika Madhyamaka as the highest view and critiqued the svatantrika position. Tsongkhapa argued that, because svatantrika conventionally establishes things by their own characteristics, they fail to completely understand the emptiness of phenomena and hence do not achieve the same realization. Drawing on Chandrakirti, Tsongkhapa rejected the Yogacara teachings, even as a provisional stepping point to the Madhyamaka view. Tsongkhapa was also critical of the Shengtong view of Dolpopa, which he saw as dangerously absolutist and hence outside the middle way. Tsongkhapa identified two major flaws in interpretations of Madhyamika, under-negation (of svabhava or own essence), which could lead to Absolutism, and over-negation, which could lead to Nihilism. Tsongkhapa's solution to this dilemma was the promotion of the use of inferential reasoning only within the conventional realm of the two truths framework, allowing for the use of reason for ethics, conventional monastic rules and promoting a conventional epistemic realism, while holding that, from the view of ultimate truth (paramarthika satya), all things (including Buddha nature and Nirvana) are empty of inherent existence (svabhava), and that true liberation is this realization of emptiness.

Sakya scholars such as Rongtön and Gorampa disagreed with Tsongkhapa, and argued that the prasangika svatantrika distinction was merely pedagogical. Gorampa also critiqued Tsongkhapa's realism, arguing that the structures which allow an empty object to be presented as conventionally real eventually dissolve under analysis and are thus unstructured and non-conceptual (spros bral). Tsongkhapa's students Gyel-tsap, Kay-drup, and Ge-dun-drup set forth an epistemological realism against the Sakya scholars' anti-realism.

=== Sakya ===
Sakya Pandita (1182–1251) was a 13th-century head of the Sakya school and ruler of Tibet. He was also one of the most important Buddhist philosophers in the Tibetan tradition, writing works on logic and epistemology and promoting Dharmakirti's Pramanavarttika (Commentary on Valid Cognition) as central to the scholastic study. Sakya Pandita's 'Treasury of Logic on Valid Cognition' (Tshad ma rigs pa'i gter) set forth the classic Sakya epistemic anti-realist position, arguing that concepts such as universals are not known through valid cognition and hence are not real objects of knowledge. Sakya Pandita was also critical of theories of sudden awakening, which were held by some teachers of the "Chinese Great Perfection" in Tibet.

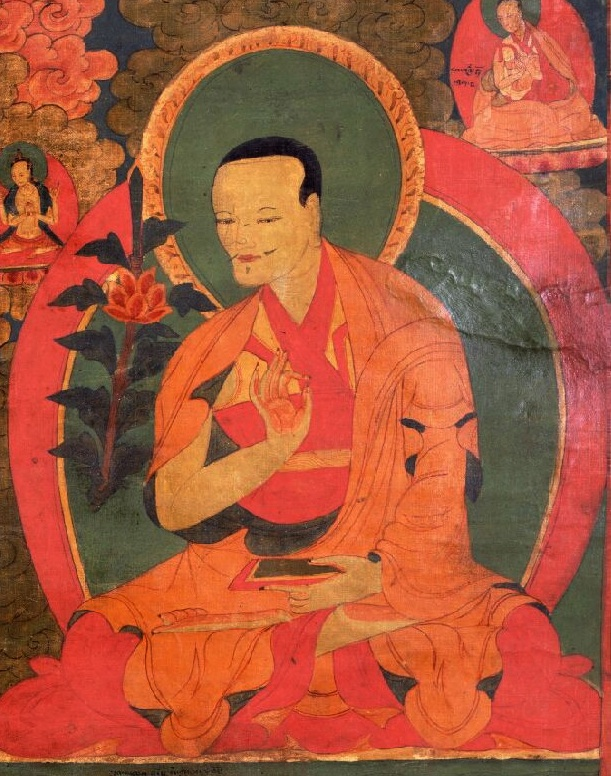
Gorampa Sonam Senge

Later Sakyas such as Gorampa (1429–1489) and Sakya Chokden (1428–1507) would develop and defend Sakya anti-realism, and they are seen as the major interpreters and critics of Sakya Pandita's philosophy. Sakya Chokden also critiqued Tsongkhapa's interpretation of Madhyamaka and Dolpopa's Shentong. In his Definite ascertainment of the middle way, Chokden criticized Tsongkhapa's view as being too logo-centric and still caught up in conceptualization about the ultimate reality which is beyond language. Sakya Chokden's philosophy attempted to reconcile the views of the Yogacara and Madhyamaka, seeing them both as valid and complementary perspectives on ultimate truth. Madhyamaka is seen by Chokden as removing the fault of taking the unreal as being real, and Yogacara removes the fault of the denial of Reality. Likewise, the Shentong and Rangtong views are seen as complementary by Sakya Chokden; Rangtong negation is effective in cutting through all clinging to wrong views and conceptual rectification, while Shentong is more amenable for describing and enhancing meditative experience and realization. Therefore, for Sakya Chokden, the same realization of ultimate reality can be accessed and described in two different but compatible ways.

=== Nyingma ===
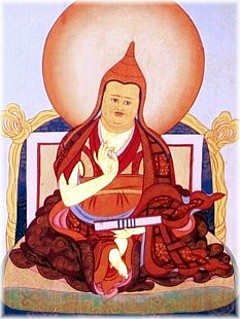
Jamgon Ju Mipham Gyatso

The Nyingma school is strongly influenced by the view of Dzogchen (Great Perfection) and the Dzogchen Tantric literature. Longchenpa (1308–1364) was a major philosopher of the Nyingma school and wrote an extensive number of works on the Tibetan practice of Dzogchen and on Buddhist Tantra. These include the Seven Treasures, the Trilogy of Natural Ease, and his Trilogy of Dispelling Darkness. Longchenpa's works provide a philosophical understanding of Dzogchen, a defense of Dzogchen in light of the sutras, as well as practical instructions. For Longchenpa, the ground of reality is luminous emptiness, rigpa ("knowledge"), or buddha nature, and this ground is also the bridge between sutra and tantra. Longchenpa's philosophy sought to establish the positive aspects of Buddha nature thought against the totally negative theology of Madhyamika without straying into the absolutism of Dolpopa. For Longchenpa, the basis for Dzogchen and Tantric practice in Vajrayana is the "Ground" or "Basis" (gzhi), the immanent Buddha nature, "the primordially luminous reality that is unconditioned and spontaneously present" which is "free from all elaborated extremes".

=== Rimé movement ===
The 19th century saw the rise of the Rimé movement (non-sectarian, unbiased) which sought to push back against the politically dominant Gelug school's criticisms of the Sakya, Kagyu, Nyingma, and Bon philosophical views, and develop a more eclectic or universal system of textual study. Jamyang Khyentse Wangpo (1820–1892) and Jamgön Kongtrül (1813–1899) were the founders of Rimé. The Rimé movement came to prominence at a point in Tibetan history when the religious climate had become partisan. The aim of the movement was "a push towards a middle ground where the various views and styles of the different traditions were appreciated for their individual contributions rather than being refuted, marginalized, or banned."

Philosophically, Jamgön Kongtrül defended Shentong as being compatible with Madhyamaka while another Rimé scholar Jamgon Ju Mipham Gyatso (1846–1912) criticized Tsongkhapa from a Nyingma perspective. Mipham argued that the view of the middle way is Unity (zung 'jug), meaning that from the ultimate perspective the duality of sentient beings and Buddhas is also dissolved. Mipham also affirmed the view of rangtong (self emptiness).

The later Nyingma scholar Botrul (1894–1959) classified the major Tibetan Madhyamaka positions as shentong (other emptiness), Nyingma rangtong (self emptiness) and Gelug bdentong (emptiness of true existence). The main difference between them is their "object of negation"; shengtong states that inauthentic experience is empty, rangtong negates any conceptual reference and bdentong negates any true existence.

The 14th Dalai Lama was also influenced by this non-sectarian approach. Having studied under teachers from all major Tibetan Buddhist schools, his philosophical position tends to be that the different perspectives on emptiness are complementary:

There is a tradition of making a distinction between two different perspectives on the nature of emptiness: one is when emptiness is presented within a philosophical analysis of the ultimate reality of things, in which case it ought to be understood in terms of a non-affirming negative phenomena. On the other hand, when it is discussed from the point of view of experience, it should be understood more in terms of an affirming negation – 14th Dalai Lama

== East Asian Buddhism ==
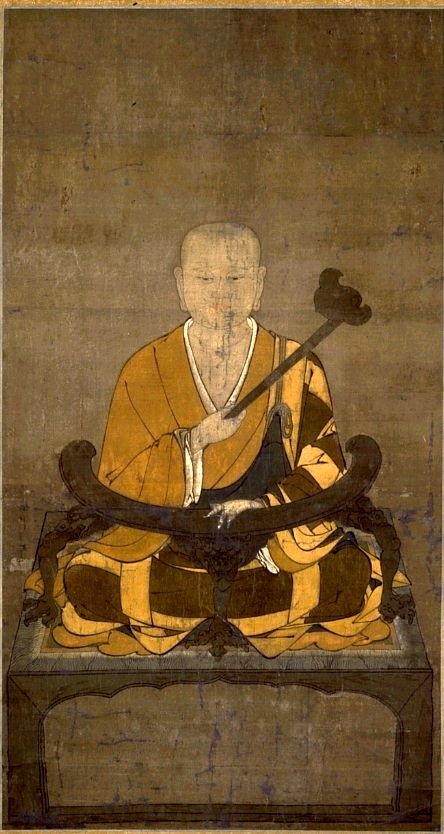
Painting of Śramaṇa Zhiyi, the founding thinker of the Tiantai school.

=== Tiantai ===
The schools of Buddhism that had existed in China prior to the emergence of the Tiantai are generally believed to represent direct transplantations from India, with little modification to their basic doctrines and methods. The Tiantai school, founded by Zhiyi (538–597), was the first truly unique Chinese Buddhist philosophical school. Tiantai doctrine sought to bring together all Buddhist teachings into a comprehensive system based on the ekayana ("one vehicle") doctrine taught in the Lotus Sutra.

Tiantai's metaphysics is an immanent holism, which sees every phenomenon (dharma) as conditioned and manifested by the whole of reality (the totality of all other dharmas). Every instant of experience is a reflection of every other, and hence, suffering and nirvana, good and bad, Buddhahood and evildoing, are all "inherently entailed" within each other.

Tiantai metaphysics is entailed in their teaching of the "three truths", which is an extension of the Mādhyamaka two truths doctrine. The three truths are: the conventional truth of appearance, the truth of emptiness and the third truth of 'the exclusive Center' (但中 danzhong) or middle way, which is beyond conventional truth and emptiness. This third truth is the Absolute and expressed by the claim that nothing is "Neither-Same-Nor-Different" than anything else, but rather each 'thing' is the absolute totality of all things manifesting as a particular, everything is mutually contained within each thing. Everything is a reflection of "The Ultimate Reality of All Appearances" (諸法實相 zhufashixiang) and each thought "contains three thousand worlds". This perspective allows the Tiantai school to state such seemingly paradoxical things as "evil is ineradicable from the highest good, Buddhahood." Moreover, in Tiantai, nirvana and samsara are ultimately the same; as Zhiyi writes, "a single, unalloyed reality is all there is – no entities whatever exist outside of it."

While Zhiyi did write "one thought contains three thousand worlds", this does not entail idealism. According to Zhiyi, "the objects of the [true] aspects of reality are not something produced by Buddhas, gods, or men. They exist inherently on their own and have no beginning" (The Esoteric Meaning, 210). This is then a form of realism, which sees the mind as real as the world, interconnected with and inseparable from it. In Tiantai thought, ultimate reality is simply the very phenomenal world of interconnected events or dharmas.

Other key figures of Tiantai thought are Zhanran (711–782) and Siming Zhili (960–1028). Zhanran developed the idea that non-sentient beings have buddha nature, since they are also a reflection of the Absolute. In Japan, this school was known as Tendai and was first brought to the island by Saicho. Tendai thought is more syncretic and draws on Huayan and East Asian Esoteric Buddhism.

=== Huayan ===
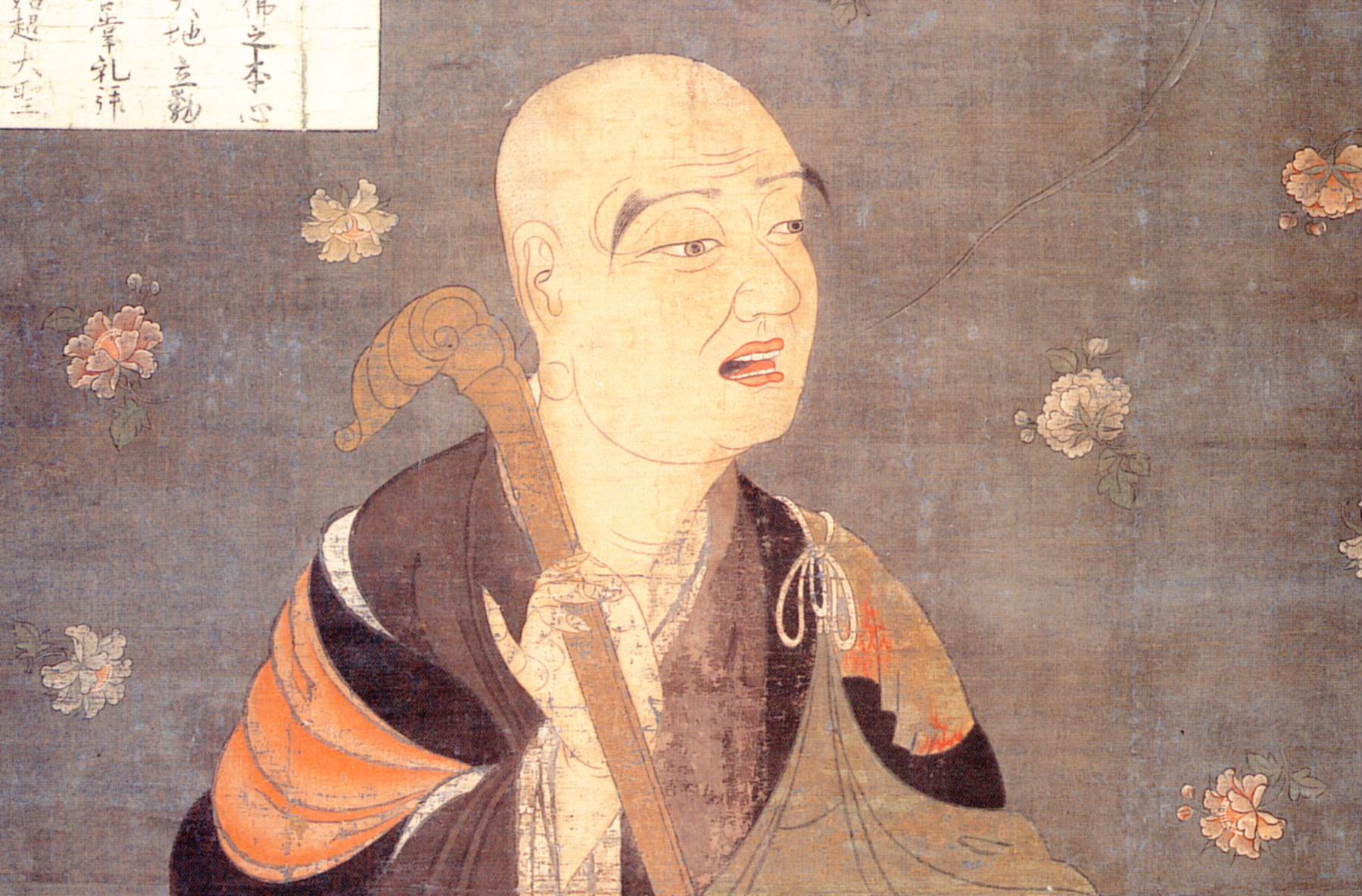
A 13th century Japanese print of Fazang, the most important philosopher of the Huayan school.

The Huayan school is the other native Chinese doctrinal system. Huayan is known for the doctrine of "perfect interpenetration" (Chn: 圓融; yuánróng), based on the Avataṃsaka Sūtra (Flower Garland Sutra). Huayan holds that all phenomena (Sanskrit: dharmas) are deeply interconnected, mutually arising and that every phenomenon contains all other phenomena. Various metaphors and images are used to illustrate this idea. The first is known as Indra's net. The net is set with jewels which have the extraordinary property that they reflect all of the other jewels, while the reflections also contain every other reflection, ad infinitum. The second image is that of the world text. This image portrays the world as consisting of an enormous text which is as large as the universe itself. The words of the text are composed of the phenomena that make up the world. However, every atom of the world contains the whole text within it. It is the work of a Buddha to let out the text so that beings can be liberated from suffering.

Fazang (Fa-tsang, 643–712), one of the most important Huayan thinkers, wrote 'Essay on the Golden Lion' and 'Treatise on the Five Teachings', which contain other metaphors for the interpenetration of reality. He also used the metaphor of a house of mirrors. Fazang introduced the distinction of "the Realm of Principle" and "the Realm of Things". This theory was further developed by Cheng-guan (738–839) into the major Huayan thesis of "the fourfold Dharmadhatu" (dharma realm): the Realm of Principle, the Realm of Things, the Realm of the Noninterference between Principle and Things, and the Realm of the Noninterference of All Things. The first two are the universal and the particular, the third is the interpenetration of universal and particular, and the fourth is the interpenetration of all particulars. The third truth was explained by the metaphor of a golden lion: the gold is the universal and the particular is the shape and features of the lion.

While both Tiantai and Huayan hold to the interpenetration and interconnection of all things, their metaphysics have some differences. Huayan metaphysics is influenced by Yogacara thought and is closer to idealism. The Avatamsaka sutra compares the phenomenal world to a dream, an illusion, and a magician's conjuring. The sutra states nothing has true reality, location, beginning and end, or substantial nature. The Avatamsaka also states that "The triple world is illusory – it is only made by one mind", and Fazang echoes this by writing, "outside of mind there is not a single thing that can be apprehended." Furthermore, according to Huayan thought, each mind creates its own world "according to their mental patterns", and "these worlds are infinite in kind" and constantly arising and passing away. However, in Huayan, the mind is not real either, but also empty. The true reality in Huayan, the noumenon, or "Principle", is likened to a mirror, while phenomena are compared to reflections in the mirror. It is also compared to the ocean, and phenomena to waves.

In Korea, this school was known as Hwaeom and is represented in the work of Wonhyo (617–686), who also wrote about the idea of essence-function, a central theme in Korean Buddhist thought. In Japan, Huayan is known as Kegon and one of its major proponents was Myōe, who also introduced Tantric practices.

=== Chan and Japanese Buddhism ===
The philosophy of Chinese Chan Buddhism and Japanese Zen is based on various sources; these include Chinese Madhyamaka (Sānlùn), Yogacara (Wéishí), the Laṅkāvatāra Sūtra, and the Buddha nature texts. An important issue in Chan is that of subitism or "sudden awakening", the idea that insight happens all at once in a flash of insight. This view was promoted by Shenhui and is a central issue discussed in the Platform Sutra, a key Chan scripture composed in China.

Huayan philosophy also had an influence on Chan. The theory of the Fourfold Dharmadhatu influenced the Five Ranks of Dongshan Liangjie (806–869), the founder of the Caodong Chan lineage. Guifeng Zongmi, who was also a patriarch of Huayan Buddhism, wrote extensively on the philosophy of Chan and on the Avatamsaka sutra.

Japanese Buddhism during the 6th and 7th centuries saw an increase in the proliferation of new schools and forms of thought, a period known as the six schools of Nara (Nanto Rokushū). The Kamakura Period (1185–1333) also saw another flurry of intellectual activity. During this period, the influential figure of Nichiren (1222–1282) made the practice and universal message of the Lotus Sutra more readily available to the population. He is of particular importance in the history of thought and religion, as his teachings constitute a separate sect of Buddhism, one of the only major sects to have originated in Japan

Also during the Kamakura period, the founder of Soto Zen, Dogen (1200–1253), wrote many works on the philosophy of Zen, and the Shobogenzo is his magnum opus. In Korea, Chinul was an important exponent of Seon Buddhism at around the same time.

=== Esoteric Buddhism ===
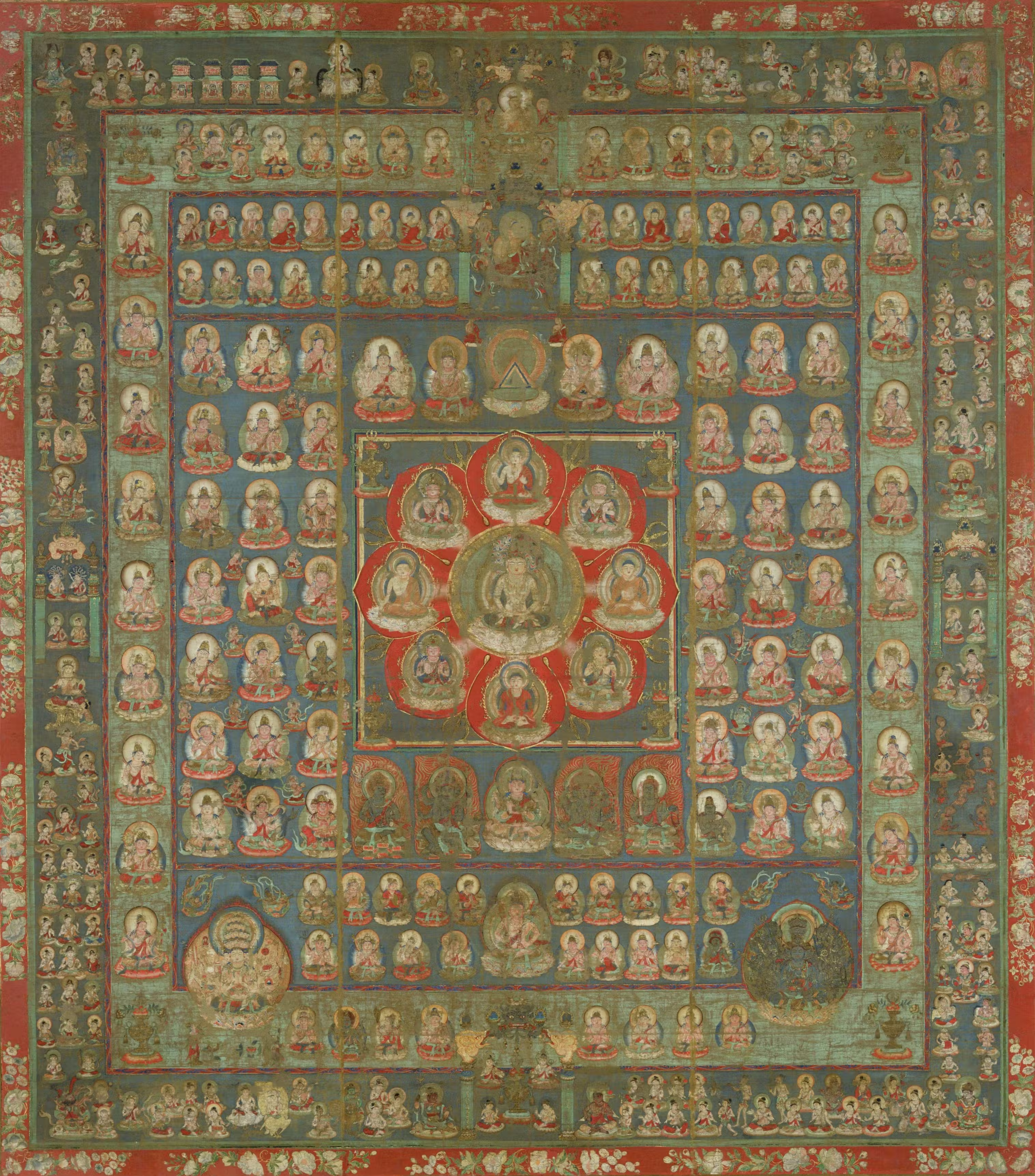
The Garbhadhatu mandala. The center square represents the young stage of Vairocana Buddha.

Tantric Buddhism arrived in China in the 7th century, during the Tang dynasty. In China, this form of Buddhism is known as Mìzōng (密宗), or "Esoteric School", and Zhenyan (true word, Sanskrit: Mantrayana). Kūkai (AD774–835) is a major Japanese Buddhist philosopher and the founder of the Tantric Shingon (true word) school in Japan. He wrote on a wide variety of topics such as public policy, language, the arts, literature, music and religion. After studying in China under Huiguo, Kūkai brought together various elements into a cohesive philosophical system of Shingon.

Kūkai's philosophy is based on the Mahavairocana Tantra and the Vajrasekhara Sutra (both from the seventh century). His Benkenmitsu nikkyôron (Treatise on the Differences Between Esoteric and Exoteric Teachings) outlines the difference between exoteric, mainstream Mahayana Buddhism (kengyô) and esoteric Tantric Buddhism (mikkyô). Kūkai provided the theoretical framework for the esoteric Buddhist practices of Mantrayana, bridging the gap between the doctrine of the sutras and tantric practices. At the foundation of Kūkai's thought is the Trikaya doctrine, which holds there are three "bodies of the Buddha".

According to Kūkai, esoteric Buddhism has the Dharmakaya (Jpn: hosshin, embodiment of truth) as its source, which is associated with Vairocana Buddha (Dainichi). Hosshin is embodied absolute reality and truth. Hosshin is mostly ineffable but can be experienced through esoteric practices such as mudras and mantras. While Mahayana is taught by the historical Buddha (nirmāṇakāya), it does not have ultimate reality as its source or the practices to experience the esoteric truth. For Shingon, from an enlightened perspective, the whole phenomenal world itself is also the teaching of Vairocana. The body of the world, its sounds and movements, is the body of truth (dharma) and furthermore it is also identical with the personal body of the cosmic Buddha. For Kūkai, world, actions, persons and Buddhas are all part of the cosmic monologue of Vairocana, they are the truth being preached, to its own self manifestations. This is hosshin seppô (literally: "the dharmakâya's expounding of the Dharma") which can be accessed through mantra which is the cosmic language of Vairocana emanating through cosmic vibration concentrated in sound. In a broad sense, the universe itself is a huge text expressing ultimate truth (Dharma) which must be "read".

Dainichi means "Great Sun" and Kūkai uses this as a metaphor for the great primordial Buddha, whose teaching and presence illuminates and pervades all, like the light of the sun. This immanent presence also means that every being already has access to the liberated state (hongaku) and Buddha nature, and that, because of this, there is the possibility of "becoming Buddha in this very embodied existence" (sokushinjôbutsu). This is achieved because of the non-dual relationship between the macrocosm of Hosshin and the microcosm of the Shingon practitioner.

Kūkai's exposition of what has been called Shingon's "metaphysics" is based on the three aspects of the cosmic truth or Hosshin – body, appearance and function. The body is the physical and mental elements, which are the body and mind of the cosmic Buddha and which is also empty (Shunyata). The physical universe for Shingon contains the interconnected mental and physical events. The appearance aspect is the form of the world, which appears as mandalas of interconnected realms and is depicted in mandala art such as the Womb Realm mandala. The function is the movement and change which happens in the world, which includes change in forms, sounds and thought. These forms, sounds and thoughts are expressed by the Shingon practitioner in various rituals and tantric practices which allow them to connect with and inter-resonate with Dainichi and hence attain liberation here and now.

== Modern philosophy ==
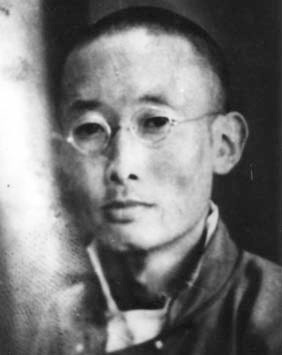
A portrait of Gendün Chöphel in India, 1936.

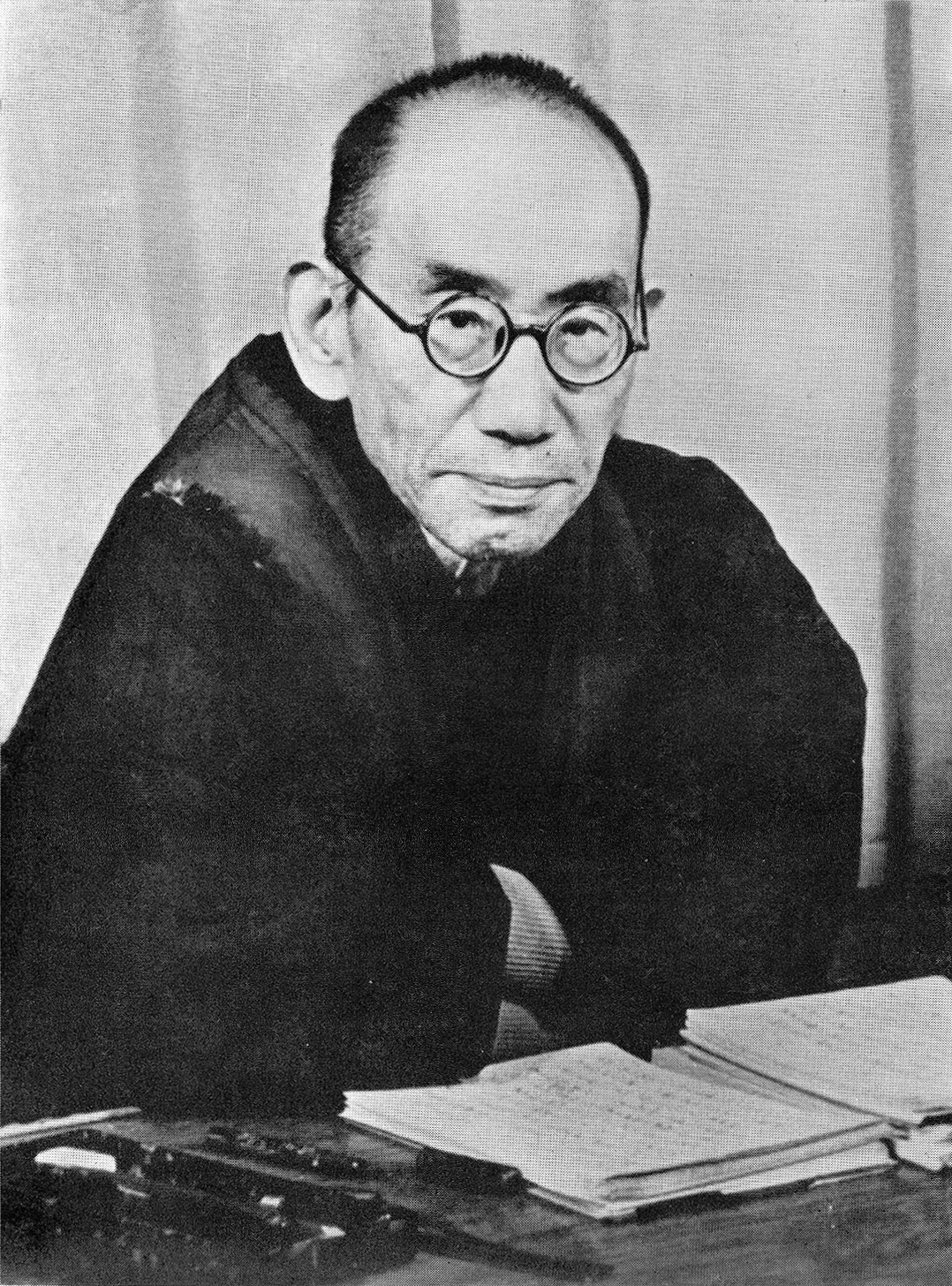
Kitarō Nishida, professor of philosophy at Kyoto University and founder of the Kyoto School.

In Sri Lanka, Buddhist modernists such as Anagarika Dharmapala (1864–1933) and the American convert Henry Steel Olcott sought to show that Buddhism was rational and compatible with modern Scientific ideas such as the theory of evolution. Dharmapala also argued that Buddhism included a strong social element, interpreting it as liberal, altruistic and democratic.

A later Sri Lankan philosopher, K. N. Jayatilleke (1920–1970), wrote the classic modern account of Buddhist epistemology (Early Buddhist Theory of Knowledge, 1963). His student David Kalupahana wrote on the history of Buddhist thought and psychology. Other important Sri Lankan Buddhist thinkers include Ven Ñāṇananda (Concept and Reality), Walpola Rahula, Hammalawa Saddhatissa (Buddhist Ethics, 1987), Gunapala Dharmasiri (A Buddhist critique of the Christian concept of God, 1988), P. D. Premasiri and R. G. de S. Wettimuny.

In 20th-century China, the modernist Taixu (1890–1947) advocated a reform and revival of Buddhism. He promoted an idea of a Buddhist Pure Land, not as a metaphysical place in Buddhist cosmology but as something possible to create here and now in this very world, which could be achieved through a "Buddhism for Human Life" (Chinese: 人生佛教; pinyin: rénshēng fójiào) which was free of supernatural beliefs. Taixu also wrote on the connections between modern science and Buddhism, ultimately holding that "scientific methods can only corroborate the Buddhist doctrine, they can never advance beyond it". Like Taixu, Yin Shun (1906–2005) advocated a form of Humanistic Buddhism grounded in concern for humanitarian issues, and his students and followers have been influential in promoting Humanistic Buddhism in Taiwan. This period also saw a revival of the study of Weishi (Yogachara), by Yang Rensan (1837–1911), Ouyang Jinwu (1871–1943) and Liang Shuming (1893–1988).

One of Tibetan Buddhism's most influential modernist thinkers is Gendün Chöphel (1903–1951), who, according to Donald S. Lopez Jr., "was arguably the most important Tibetan intellectual of the twentieth century." Gendün Chöphel travelled throughout India with the Indian Buddhist Rahul Sankrityayan and wrote a wide variety of material, including works promoting the importance of modern science to his Tibetan countrymen and also Buddhist philosophical texts such as Adornment for Nagarjuna's Thought. Another very influential Tibetan Buddhist modernist was Chögyam Trungpa, whose Shambhala Training was meant to be more suitable to modern Western sensitivities by offering a vision of "secular enlightenment".

In Southeast Asia, thinkers such as Buddhadasa, Thích Nhất Hạnh, Sulak Sivaraksa and Aung San Suu Kyi have promoted a philosophy of socially Engaged Buddhism and have written on the socio-political application of Buddhism. Likewise, Buddhist approaches to economic ethics (Buddhist economics) have been explored in the works of E. F. Schumacher, Prayudh Payutto, Neville Karunatilake, and Padmasiri de Silva. The study of the Pali Abhidhamma tradition continued to be influential in Myanmar, where it was developed by monks such as Ledi Sayadaw and Mahasi Sayadaw.

Japanese philosophy was heavily influenced by the work of the Kyoto School which included Kitaro Nishida, Keiji Nishitani, Hajime Tanabe and Masao Abe. These thinkers brought Buddhist ideas in dialogue with Western philosophy, especially European phenomenologists and existentialists. The most important trend in Japanese Buddhist thought after the formation of the Kyoto school is Critical Buddhism, which argues against several Mahayana concepts such as Buddha nature and original enlightenment.

The Japanese Zen Buddhist D.T. Suzuki (1870–1966) was instrumental in bringing Zen Buddhism to the West and his Buddhist modernist works were very influential in the United States. Suzuki's worldview was a Zen Buddhism influenced by Romanticism and Transcendentalism, which promoted spiritual freedom as "a spontaneous, emancipatory consciousness that transcends rational intellect and social convention." This idea of Buddhism influenced the Beat writers, and a contemporary representative of Western Buddhist Romanticism is Gary Snyder. The American Theravada Buddhist monk Thanissaro Bhikkhu has critiqued 'Buddhist Romanticism' in his writings.

Western Buddhist monastics and priests such as Nanavira Thera, Bhikkhu Bodhi, Nyanaponika Thera, Robert Aitken, Taigen Dan Leighton, and Matthieu Ricard have written texts on Buddhist philosophy. A feature of Buddhist thought in the West has been a desire for dialogue and integration with modern science and psychology, and various modern Buddhists such as B. Alan Wallace, James H. Austin, Mark Epstein and the 14th Dalai Lama have worked and written on this issue.

Another area of convergence has been Buddhism and environmentalism, which is explored in the work of Joanna Macy. Another Western Buddhist philosophical trend has been the project to secularize Buddhism, as seen in the works of Stephen Batchelor.

In the West, Comparative philosophy between Buddhist and Western thought began with the work of Charles A. Moore, who founded the journal Philosophy East and West. Contemporary Western Academics such as Mark Siderits, Jan Westerhoff, Jonardon Ganeri, Miri Albahari, Owen Flanagan, Damien Keown, Tom Tillemans, David Loy, Evan Thompson, and Jay Garfield have written various works which interpret Buddhist ideas through Western philosophy.

== Comparison with other philosophies ==
Scholars such as Thomas McEvilley, Christopher I. Beckwith, and Adrian Kuzminski have identified cross influences between ancient Buddhism and the ancient Greek philosophy of Pyrrhonism. The Greek philosopher Pyrrho spent 18 months in India as part of Alexander the Great's court on Alexander's conquest of western India, where ancient biographers say his contact with the gymnosophists caused him to create his philosophy. Because of the high degree of similarity between Nāgārjuna's philosophy and Pyrrhonism, particularly the surviving works of Sextus Empiricus, Thomas McEvilley suspects that Nāgārjuna was influenced by Greek Pyrrhonist texts imported into India.

Baruch Spinoza, though he argued for the existence of a permanent reality, asserts that all phenomenal existence is transitory. In his opinion sorrow is conquered "by finding an object of knowledge which is not transient, not ephemeral, but is immutable, permanent, everlasting." The Buddha taught that the only thing which is eternal is Nirvana. David Hume, after a relentless analysis of the mind, concluded that consciousness consists of fleeting mental states. Hume's Bundle theory is a very similar concept to the Buddhist skandhas, though his skepticism about causation leads him to opposite conclusions in other areas. Arthur Schopenhauer's philosophy parallels Buddhism in his affirmation of asceticism and renunciation as a response to suffering and desire (cf. Schopenhauer's The World as Will and Representation, 1818).

Ludwig Wittgenstein's "language-game" closely parallel the warning that intellectual speculation or papañca is an impediment to understanding, as found in the Buddhist Parable of the Poison Arrow. Friedrich Nietzsche, although himself dismissive of Buddhism as yet another nihilism, had a similar impermanent view of the self. Heidegger's ideas on being and nothingness have been held by some to be similar to Buddhism today.

An alternative approach to the comparison of Buddhist thought with Western philosophy is to use the concept of the Middle Way in Buddhism as a critical tool for the assessment of Western philosophies. In this way, Western philosophies can be classified in Buddhist terms as eternalist or nihilist. In a Buddhist view, all philosophies are considered non-essential views (ditthis) and not to be clung to.

== See also ==
- Abhidharma
- Buddhism and psychology
- Buddhism and science
- Buddhism and sexuality
- Buddhism and Western philosophy
- Buddhist influences on Advaita Vedanta
- Buddhist logic
- Buddhist texts
  - Buddhist canons
  - Mahayana sutras
- Creator in Buddhism
- Enlightenment in Buddhism
  - Buddhahood
  - Buddhist paths to liberation
  - Four stages of enlightenment
  - Two truths doctrine
- Glossary of Buddhism
- Index of Buddhism-related articles
- Mindfulness
- Mindstream
- Outline of Buddhism
- Reality in Buddhism
- The unanswerable questions

== Sources ==
- Anderson, Carol (1999), Pain and Its Ending: The Four Noble Truths in the Theravada Buddhist Canon, Routledge
- Bronkhorst, Johannes (1993), The Two Traditions of Meditation in Ancient India, Motilal Banarsidass
- Capriles, Elías, The Four Schools of Buddhist Philosophy: Clear Discrimination of Views Pointing at the Definitive Meaning (PDF), archived from the original (PDF) on 17 July 2011
- Cousins, L. S. (1996), "The dating of the historical Buddha: a review article", Journal of the Royal Asiatic Society, 3, 6 (1): 57–63, doi:10.1017/S1356186300014760, S2CID 162929573, archived from the original on 26 February 2011
- Edelglass, William; Garfield, Jay (2009), Buddhist Philosophy: Essential Readings, New York: Oxford University Press, ISBN 978-0-19-532817-2
- Gombrich, Richard F. (1997), How Buddhism Began, Munshiram Manoharlal
- Kalupahana, David J. (1992), The Principles of Buddhist Psychology, Delhi: Sri Satguru Publications
- Kalupahana, David J. (1994), A history of Buddhist philosophy, Delhi: Motilal Banarsidass Publishers Private Limited
- Lopez Jr., Donald S., ed. (2007) [1995]. Buddhism in Practice: Abridged Edition. Princeton Readings in Religions. Princeton, New Jersey and Woodstock, Oxfordshire: Princeton University Press. pp. 3–36. doi:10.2307/j.ctvcm4h64.8. ISBN 9780691129686. JSTOR j.ctvcm4h64. LCCN 2006050985.
- Perdue, Daniel (1992), Debate in Tibetan Buddhism, Snow Lion Publications, ISBN 978-0-937938-76-8
- Siderits, Mark (2007). Buddhism as Philosophy: An Introduction (1st ed.). Farnham, Surrey: Ashgate Publishing. ISBN 9781624669811. LCCN 2006013183.
- Vetter, Tilmann (1988), The Ideas and Meditative Practices of Early Buddhism, BRILL
