= P. D. Premasiri =

Sri Lankan Buddhist scholar

- Born: Pahalawattage Don Premasiri; 25 July 1941 (age 85); Kotte, Colombo, British Ceylon
- Education: University of Hawaii of Manoa
- Known for: Buddhist ethics and Buddhist philosophy
- Spouse: Padma Wanniarachchi
- Scientific career
- Workplaces: University of Peradeniya, Buddhist Publication Society, Sri Lanka International Buddhist Academy
- Thesis: Moral Evaluation in Early Buddhism: From the Perspective of Western Philosophical Analysis
- Doctoral advisor: Eliot Deutsch
- Other academic advisors: David Kalupahana
- Doctoral students: Bhikkhu Analayo

Pahalawattage Don Premasiri (born 25 July 1941) is a Sri Lankan Buddhist scholar specializing in the areas of Buddhist ethics and Buddhist philosophy. Premasiri's academic training represents a synthesis of both the Buddhist and Western philosophical traditions, first at the University of Peradeniya and subsequently at Cambridge and Hawaii. He is currently president of the Buddhist Publication Society and professor emeritus in the Department of Pali and Buddhist Studies at the University of Peradeniya.

== Early life ==
P. D. Premasiri was born in Kotte, a suburb of Colombo, British Ceylon on July 25, 1941. He received his primary and secondary education from Christian College, a boys' school in Kotte presently known as Sri Jayawardenepura Maha Vidyalaya. Inspired by his father's talks on Buddhism, Premasiri started studying Pali at the age of 14.

== Education ==
He entered the University of Peradeniya in 1959 as a student in the Pali and Buddhist Civilization Department where he chose Pali as his subject of specialization. At Peradeniya he studied under Buddhist scholars Venerable Professor Dhammavihari, W.S. Karunaratne, Lily de Silva, and David Kalupahana. Although Premasiri was not enrolled in the philosophy department, he also audited a class under Philosophy Professor K.N. Jayatilleke with his permission. In 1963, after receiving a B.A. in Pali with First Class Honours, Premasiri was invited to join the Peradeniya academic staff as a temporary assistant lecturer and was awarded an Oriental Studies scholarship to study abroad. With encouragement from K.N. Jayatilleke, Premasiri traveled to the UK in 1965 and studied western ethics and philosophy at the University of Cambridge under notable British Philosophers such as Sir Bernard Williams. While at Cambridge, a contemporary and friend to Premasiri was leading Buddhist scholar L.S. Cousins. After earning a second B.A. and an M.A. in Western Philosophy at Cambridge, he returned to Peradeniya in 1968 and taught in both the Pali and Buddhist Civilization Department and the Department of Buddhist Philosophy.

In 1972 the two Buddhist studies departments at Peradeniya were uprooted during the Sri Lankan government's university reorganization. Premasiri, along with several other professors, protested the reorganization and their petition resulted in the Department of Language and Cultural Studies, which would later become the renewed Pali and Buddhist Studies Department at Peradeniya. In the aftermath of university reorganizing, Premasiri received an East-West Center Fellowship to study for his PhD at the University of Hawaii at Manoa. In 1977, he traveled to Hawaii and worked on his doctorate for three years under eminent philosophers David Kalupahana and Eliot Deutsch in the University of Hawaii's philosophy department. In 1980, after receiving his PhD in Comparative Philosophy from Hawaii, he again returned to Peradeniya to continue teaching.

== Academic career ==
In the years following his return to the University of Peradeniya, Premasiri served in both the department of philosophy and the Department of Pali and Buddhist Studies. In 1997, Premasiri became head of the Pali and Buddhist Studies Department and served in this role until 2004, with a one-year research sabbatical in Norway. In 2006, Premasiri retired as the Pali and Buddhist Studies Department's Senior Professor, and in 2007 Premasiri was named professor emeritus at Peradeniya, where he continues to teach.

The beginnings of P.D. Premasiri's academic career as a lecturer and professor were intermingled with his pursuit for academic training. Premasiri's academic career can be seen as a synthesis between Western academia and early Buddhist thought. He combined the western and Buddhist intellectual traditions by teaching the fundamentals of early Buddhist thought with a western scholastic approach and by critiquing Western Philosophy from an early Buddhist perspective. P.D. Premasiri's professional integrity can be understood by his focus on early Buddhist ethics in his writings and his continual commitment to preserving the Buddhist academic tradition at the University of Peradeniya. Though he traveled to the U.K. and to the U.S. to receive academic training, he continually returned to the country of his birth and especially to the University of Peradeniya to serve and teach.

In the course of Premasiri's fifty-year academic career, he has published articles in a vast array of academic journals, contributed several entries to the Encyclopedia of Buddhism, and written essays and newsletters for the BPS. He has presented and participated in academic institutions and conferences around the world, in countries including Thailand, Malaysia, Norway, Singapore, Sri Lanka, South Korea, England, France, South Africa, India, Switzerland, and the US. He has also served as guest faculty for a number of universities outside of Peradeniya. In 1988/89, a Fulbright Scholar-in-Residence Program took him to Colby College in Waterville, Maine, where he served as a visiting professor in the philosophy department. In 1999, he served as a guest researcher in the department of philosophy at the University of Bergen, Norway. In 2000, he served as guest researcher at the Department of Religion at the same university. In 2004 he taught at Washington State University at Pullman in the philosophy department. In 2007 he taught at Colgate University Hamilton, New York in the Department of Religious Studies. In 2009 he co-founded and was named director of academic affairs at SIBA, where he continues to teach and provide academic leadership for SIBA's Department of Buddhist Studies. He has also taught at the Buddhist College in Singapore, Buddha Dhamma Mandala Society in Singapore, and Thanghsian Institution in Malaysia.

== Organizational appointments ==
Premasiri also serves on various non-profit boards. He has been a long-time member of the board of management of the Buddhist Publication Society (PBS) in Kandy, Sri Lanka, and in 2011 succeeded Bhikkhu Bodhi as the 3rd president of the Buddhist Publication Society. In addition to currently serving as president of BPS, he founded and currently serves as president for the Society for the Integration of Science and Human Values (SISHVA), and he is the president of the Sri Lanka Association for Buddhist Studies (SLABS). Besides these organizational involvements, Premasiri has also conducted a Meditation and Pali Text Study Group in Kandy on a regular basis since 1994.

== Awards ==
- The Oriental Studies Scholarship, B.A. Special Degree Examination, 1963.
- East-West Center Scholarship, 1977.
- Fulbright Fellow-in-Residence Fellowship, 1988.
- Guest Researcher for Norway in the department of philosophy, 1999
- Guest Researcher for Norway in the department of religious studies, 2000

== Publications ==
- Moral Evaluation in Early Buddhism, P.D. Premasiri, Sri Lanka Journal of the Humanities, 63–74. (1975)
- Interpretation of Two Principle Ethical Terms in Early Buddhism, P.D. Premasiri, Sri Lanka Journal of the Humanities, pp. 63–74. June. (1976)
- Ideas of the Good in Buddhist Philosophy, P.D. Premasiri, A Companion to World Philosophies, ed. Eliot Deutsch and Ron Bontekoe, pp. 349–359. (1977)
- Moral Evaluation In Early Buddhism: From The Perspective Of Western Philosophical Analysis, A dissertation submitted to the graduate division of the university of Hawaii in partial fulfillment of the requirements for the degree of doctor of philosophy in philosophy, by Pahalawattage Don Premasiri. (1980)
- Early Buddhist Conception of Ethical Knowledge-A Philosophical Analysis, P.D. Premasiri, Buddhist Philosophy and Culture, Essays in honour of N.A. Jayawickrema, ed. D.J. Kalupahana, W.G. Weeraratne, Colombo, pp. 37–70. (1987)
- Ethics of the Theravada Buddhist Tradition, P.D. Premasiri, World Religions and Global Ethics, ed. S. Cromwell Crawford, New York, pp. 36–64. (1988)
- Ethics, P.D. Premasiri, Encyclopaedia of Buddhism Vol. V, Colombo, The Government of Sri Lanka, pp. 144–165. (1990)
- Good and Evil, P.D. Premasiri, Encyclopaedia of Buddhism, Vol.V, Colombo, The Government of Sri Lanka, pp. 359–364. (1990)
- The Buddhist Analysis of the Nature of Social Conflict, P.D. Premasiri, Ānanda, Essays in Honour of Ananda W.P. Guruge, (Papers on Buddhism and Indology, A Felicitation Volume Presented to Ananda W.P. Guruge on his sixtieth birthday) ed. Prof. Y. Karunadasa, Colombo, pp. 98–107. (1990)
- Vimaṃsaka Sutta and Applications of Contemporary Philosophy of Religion to Early Buddhism, P.D. Premasiri, Buddhist and Pāli University of Sri Lanka: Sri Lanka Journal of Buddhist Studies, Vol.iii, pp. 145–154. (1991)
- Significance of the Ritual Concerning Offerings to Ancestors in Theravāda Buddhism, P.D. Premasiri, Buddhist Thought and Ritual, ed. by David J. Kalupahana, New York, pp. 151–158. (1991)
- The Relevance of the Noble Eightfold Path to Contemporary Society, P.D. Premasiri, Buddhist Ethics and Modern Society – An International Symposium, ed. Charles Wei-hsun Fu & Sandra A. Wayrytko, Chung-Hwa Institute of Buddhist Studies, pp. 131–142. (1991)
- The Theravada Buddhist Doctrine of Survival after Death, P.D. Premasiri, Concepts of Transmigration: Perspectives on Reincarnation, ed. Steven, J. Kaplan, Studies in Comparative Religion, Vol.6, The Edwin Mellen Press, pp. 133–187. (1996)
- Humanization of Development, A Theravada Buddhist Perspective, P.D. Premasiri, Interface of Cultural Identity and Development, Culture and Development, No.1, ed. Baidyanath Saraswati, New Delhi, pp. 29–42. (1996)
- Logic of Moral Discourse and the Problem of Moral Knowledge, P.D. Premasiri, Fr. Paanditharatne Felicitation Volume, Kandy, pp. 176–185. (1996)
- Buddhist Values in the Emerging Global Culture, P.D. Premasiri, Dialogue and Universalism toward Synergy of Civilizations, Vol.VII, No.11-12, Poland, pp. 85–95. (1997)
- Sri Lanka and the Sarvodaya Model, P.D. Premasiri, Integration of Endogenous Cultural Dimension into Development, No.2, ed. Baidyanath Saraswati, New Delhi, pp. 123–134. (1997)
- Buddhism in a Value-Changing Society, P.D. Premasiri, Bodhi Leaves No: 148, Buddhist Publication Society, Kandy, (1999)
- Religious Values And The Measurement Of Poverty: A Buddhist Perspective, P.D. Premasiri, Values, Norms and Poverty: A Consultation for The World Bank's World Development Report 2000/1: Poverty and Development, Johannesburg, South Africa, January 12–14. (1999)
- Buddhist Philosophy on Rebirth, P.D. Premasiri, Trends in Rebirth Research: Proceedings of an International Seminar, ed. by Nimal Senanayake, Pub. by Vishva Lekha, Sri Lanka, pp. 79–89. (2001)
- Right Knowledge, P.D. Premasiri, Bodhi Leaves No. 155, Buddhist Publication Society, Kandy. (2001)
- Buddhist Ethics: Moral Perfection and Modern Society, P.D. Premasiri, Buddhist Publication Society, Newsletter No. 49, Kandy. (2002)
- Origins of Gender Differentiation and Sexuality, P.D. Premasiri, Buddhist Studies, Essays In Honour of Professor Lily de Silva, Department of Pali and Buddhist Studies, University of Peradeniya, pp. 84–104. (2002)
- The Ultimate Goal of Early Buddhism and the Distinctive Characteristics of Buddhist Meditation, P.D. Premasiri, Approaching the Dhamma, Buddhist Texts and Practices in South and Southeast Asia, ed. Anne M. Blackburn & Jeffrey Samuels, BPE, Seattle, pp. 153–166. (2003)
- Ecological Teachings in Early Buddhism, P.D. Premasiri, seminar paper presented at the University of Peradeniya, January, (2004)
- The Early Buddhist Teaching on Transience, Immortality and Liberation, P.D. Premasiri, Dhamma-Vinaya, Essays in Honour of Venerable Professor Dhammavihari (Jotiya Dhirasekara), ed. Asanga Tilakaratne, Toshiichi Endo, G.A. Somaratne, Sanath Nanayakkara, Slabs. pp. 153–169. (2005)
- Implications of Buddhist Perspectives on Notions of Identity and Difference in Social Relationships, P.D. Premasiri, Identity and Difference, Essays on Society and Culture in Sri Lanka, ed. John Clifford Holt and P.B. Meegaskumbura, pp. 231–258. (2006)
- Can Peace In The Larger Society Be Promoted Without Inner Peace Within The Individual: A Response In Terms Of Early Buddhism, P.D. Pemasiri, Buddhism and Peace: Theory and Practice, ed. Chanju Mun. Jung Bup Sa Buddhist Temple of Hawaii, pp. 61–72. (2006)
- A 'Righteous war' in Buddhism?, P.D. Premasiri, Buddhism, Conflict and Violence in Modern Sri Lanka, ed. Mahinda Deegalle, Routledge, pp. 78–85. (2006)
- Studies in Buddhist Philosophy and Religion: Collected Papers of Professor P.D. Premasiri, ed. Ven. Soorakkulame Pemaratana and Ven. Raluwe Padmasiri, Buddha Dhamma Mandala Society, Singapore and Department of Pali and Buddhist Studies, University of Peradeniya, Sri Lanka. (2006)
- The Philosophy of the Atthakavagga, P.D. Premasiri, The Wheel Publication No. 182, Buddhist Publication Society Kandy • Sri Lanka. (2008)
- Varieties of Cognition in Early Buddhism, P. D. Premasiri, Handbook of Indian Psychology, ed. K. Ramakrishna Rao, Cambridge University Press, pp. 85–104 (2008)
- Dealing with Root Causes rather than Symptoms of 'Dis-Ease': A Buddhist Approach to Global Crises, P.D. Premasiri, Buddhist Approach to Environmental Crisis, UNDV Conference Volume, The International Buddhist Conference of the United Nations Day of Vesak Celebration, Thailand, pp. 107–114, (2009)
- Philosophical and Buddhist Perspectives on the Problem of Determinism and Free Will, P.D. Premasiri, Buddhist and Pāli Studies in Honour of the Venerable Professor Kakkapalliye Anuruddha, ed. KL. Dhammajoti & Y. Karunadasa, Centre of Buddhist Studies, The University of Hong Kong, pp. 65–72. (2009)
- Rebirth, P.D. Premasiri, Encyclopaedia of Buddhism Vol. VII, Colombo, The Government of Sri Lanka, pp. 521–531. (2011)
- Role of Ethics in Socio-Economic Development: A Buddhist Perspective, Pahalawattage Premasiri, Buddhist Virtues in Socio-Economic Development, The 8th International Buddhist Conference on the United Nations Day of Vesak Celebrations, Bangkok, Pg. 131 -136. (2011)
- Cultural Interface Between India And Sri Lanka Based On Buddhist History, Art, Literature and Philosophy: The Guiding Principles Of Intellectual and Philosophical Thought Introduced To Sri Lanka With Buddhism, P. D. Premasiri, The Journey of the Holy Tree: Cultural Interface between India and Sri Lanka. The Indian Council for Cultural Relations (ICCR), Kandy, pp. 92–95 (2012)
- The Rational Foundations of Buddhist Ethics and the Buddhist Method of Moral Reasoning, P.D. Premasiri, The Washington Buddhist, Quarterly Newsletter of the Washington Buddhist Vihara Winter 2014, Washington DC. (2014)
- Buddhist Response To Social Conflict: Some Practical Buddhist Suggestions For The Resolution Of The Problem Of Social Conflict, P.D. Premasiri, The 12th International Buddhist Conference On The United Nations Day of Vesak 2015: Buddhism and World Crisis. (2015)
- Common Buddhist Text: Guidance And Insight From The Buddha, contributing trans. and main trans. of the passages in the Theravāda Dhamma section, P.D. Premasiri, chief ed. Venerable Brahmapundit, ed. Peter Harvey. (2015)
