= David Kalupahana =

Sri Lankan Buddhist scholar and philosopher (1936–2014)

David J. Kalupahana
- Born: 1936; Sri Lanka
- Died: January 15, 2014 (aged 77–78); Honolulu, Hawaii, U.S.
- Education: University of London, University of Peradeniya, Mahinda College, Galle
- Spouse: Indrani Kalupahana
- Children: Nandana Kalupahana; Dimati Kalupahana; Milinda Kalupahana
- Scientific career
- Fields: Philosophy, Buddhist Studies
- Workplaces: University of Hawaii
- Doctoral advisor: K. N. Jayatilleke
- Notable students: P. D. Premasiri

David J. Kalupahana (1936–2014) was a Buddhist scholar from Sri Lanka. He was a student of the late K.N. Jayatilleke, who was a student of Wittgenstein. He wrote mainly about epistemology, theory of language, and compared later Buddhist philosophical texts against the earliest texts and tried to present interpretations that were both historically contextualised and also compatible with the earliest texts, and in doing so, he encouraged Theravada Buddhists and scholars to reevaluate the legitimacy of later, Mahayana texts and consider them more sympathetically.

== Biography ==
Born in Galle District, Southern Sri Lanka, Kalupahana attended Mahinda College, Galle for his school education. He obtained his BA (Sri Lanka, 1959), Ph.D (London), and D. Litt (Hon. Peradeniya, Sri Lanka). He was Emeritus Professor of Philosophy at the University of Hawaii. He was assistant lecturer in Pali and Buddhist Civilization at the University of Ceylon, and studied Chinese and Tibetan at the School of Oriental and African Studies at the University of London where he completed a Ph.D. dissertation on the problem of causality in the Pali Nikayas and Chinese Agamas in 1966.

He left the University of Ceylon (1972) to join the University of Hawaii, serving as the Chairman of the Department of Philosophy and Chairman of the Graduate Field in Philosophy (1974–80). He directed international intra-religious conferences on Buddhism, and on Buddhism and Peace.

Many of his books are published and widely available in India (by Motilal Banarsidass and others), and therefore presumably have a fairly significant influence on the fields of Buddhism and Buddhist Studies in India and other nearby South Asian countries, such as his native Sri Lanka.

== Publications ==
- Mulamadhyamakakarika of Nagarjuna: The Philosophy of the Middle Way, ISBN 81-208-0774-X, published Motilal Barnasidass, 1991.
- A History Of Buddhist Philosophy: Continuities And Discontinuities
- A Path Of Righteousness: Dhammapada
- Buddhist Philosophy: A Historical Analysis. Honolulu: The University Press of Hawaii, 1976.
- Buddhist Thought And Ritual
- Causality: The Central Philosophy Of Buddhism
- Ethics In Early Buddhism
- The Buddha And The Concept Of Peace
- The Buddha’s Philosophy Of Language
- The Principles Of Buddhist Psychology
- The Way Of Siddhartha
- Nagarjuna's Moral Philosophy and Sinhala Buddhism
- A Sourcebook Of Early Buddhist Philosophy
- A Sourcebook Of Later Buddhist Philosophy
- The Wheel Of Morals Dhamma - Cakka
