= K. N. Jayatilleke =

Sri Lankan author and philosopher

- Born: 1 November 1920; Colombo, British Ceylon
- Died: 23 July 1970 (aged 49); Kandy, Dominion of Ceylon
- Education: Royal College, University of Ceylon, Cambridge University
- Occupations: Author, philosopher, professor
- Spouse: Pat Jayatilleke
- Children: Anjani Karunaratne; Nandini Karunamuni
- Writing career
- Genres: Philosophy, Buddhist Studies

Kulatissa Nanda Jayatilleke (1 November 1920 – 23 July 1970) was an internationally recognised authority on Buddhist philosophy whose book Early Buddhist Theory of Knowledge has been described as "an outstanding philosophical interpretation of the Buddha's teaching" in the Encyclopedia of Philosophy.

== Biography ==
Jayatilleke, was born on 1 November 1920, in Colombo, British Ceylon. After completing his secondary education at the Royal College in Colombo, he pursued the study of Pali and Sanskrit at the University of Ceylon obtaining a first class honours degree. He continued his education at Cambridge University with a view to acquire a firm grounding in Western philosophy. He obtained a unique training in Eastern and Western thought and an analytical approach to philosophy that provided him with a background that nourished his work throughout his career. Jayatilleke was a Nuffield Fellow in the Humanities, a Fellow of the World Academy of Arts and Sciences , Hay-Whitney-Fulbright Fellow, an editor of various philosophy journals, and was the Professor and Head of the Department of Philosophy at the University of Ceylon, from 1963 until his death in 1970.

== Contributions ==
Jayatilleke is best known as the author of the book Early Buddhist Theory of Knowledge, Perhaps the Greatest Book written by a Sri Lankan in the 20th Century a work that has been described as a "masterpiece", and as "an outstanding contribution to the history of Indian philosophy". This book traces the beginnings of ideas relating to the theory of knowledge in pre-Buddhist Indian thought and their development in early Buddhism. It consists of a comprehensive inquiry into the nature of knowledge and the questions relating to the means and limits of knowledge. The book attempts to work out a general methodology for answering questions that arise in the context of profound and sophisticated philosophical discussions, and attempts to show that the Buddha was an empiricist and verificationist who denied the meaningfulness of metaphysical utterances. Jayatilleke describes his book as an "attempt to uncover the epistemological foundations of Pali Canonical thought, from a new point of view and in the light of new material." His basic contentions were that early Buddhism has an empiricist outlook, gives a significant place to the analytic approach in philosophy, and does not contradict the findings of modern science. Jayatilleke was a student of Ludwig Wittgenstein, and a teacher of the famous Buddhist scholar, David Kalupahana.

== Work ==
Jayatilleke attempted to work out systematically the empiricist outlook in the Buddhist theory of knowledge, and to present Buddhism through the idiom, the language and methodology of the contemporary philosopher, in such a way that it would become directly relevant to the contemporary world and help in the resolution of philosophical controversies and the problems of modern man. He emphasised that it is wrong to consider the Buddha as a mere "rationalist" philosopher, and that the Buddha upheld the value of analytic reason rather than speculative reason. He presented three significant elements in the "new point of view" from which he discussed the thought of the Pali Canon- the empiricist outlook, the analytical approach, and the scientific attitude. In his book, Jayatilleke cites four ways of examining philosophical questions that bring out the analytic approach in Buddhism:

- a question which ought to be explained categorically
- a question which ought to be answered with a counter question
- a question which ought to be set aside
- a question which ought to be explained analytically

Jayatilleke had a great respect for modern scientific findings, and considered rebirth as a hypothesis capable of being scientifically verified. Apart from his basic writings in the field of epistemology, there are a number of other works. The most significant of these are "Buddhism and the race question" and the Principles of International Law in Buddhist Doctrine. The Message of the Buddha was published posthumously and contains material that he had been working at the time of his death.

== Publications ==
- 1957 ‘A Recent Criticism of Buddhism’ in The University of Ceylon Review, vol. xv. nos. 3 and 4, July-October.
- 1963 Early Buddhist Theory of Knowledge. Publisher: George Allen and Unwin.
- 1967 The Principles of International Law in Buddhist Doctrine Recueil des cours, Volume 120 (1967-I), pp. 441–567.
- 1967 Dhamma, Man and Law. Leyden.
- 1958 Buddhism and the Race Question with G. P. Malalasekera (English and French editions) Review author[s]: Andrew W. Lind Philosophy East and West, Vol. 8, No. 1/2 (Apr. – Jul. 1958). UNESCO publication.
- 1975 The Message of the Buddha Editor: Dr. Ninian Smart. Publisher: George Allen and Unwin 1974. Buddhist Publication Society 1975 (Posthumous work).
- Several Wheel Series Publications, Published by the Buddhist Publication Society, Kandy, Sri Lanka:
  - Buddhism and Science (Wheel #3)
  - Buddhism and Peace (Wheel #41)
  - Knowledge and Conduct (Wheel #50)
  - Aspects of Buddhist Social Philosophy (Wheel #128/129)
  - Survival and Karma in Buddhist Perspective (Wheel #141/143)
  - Facets of Buddhist Thought: Six Essays (Wheel #162/164)
  - Ethics in Buddhist Perspective (Wheel #175/176)
  - Significance of Vesak (Wheel #178)
  - Buddhist Attitude to Other Religions (Wheel #216)
  - Contemporary Relevance of Buddhist Philosophy (Wheel #258)
  - Facets of Buddhist Thought: Collected Essays, Buddhist Publication Society, Kandy 2009. (Contains all of Jayatillekes essays & articles including the ones previously published in The Message of the Buddha.)
