= Carol Kramer =

American archaeologist (1943–2002)

- Born: May 3, 1943; New York, New York
- Died: December 3, 2002 (aged 59); Tucson, Arizona
- Education: City College of New York; University of Pennsylvania
- Known for: Ethnoarchaeology
- Awards: Squeaky Wheel Award (Committee on the Status of Women in Anthropology); Award for Excellence in Archaeology Analysis
- Scientific career
- Thesis: The Habur Ware Ceramic Assemblage of Northern Mesopotamia: An Analysis of its Distribution

Carol Kramer (May 3, 1943 – December 3, 2002) was an American archaeologist known for conducting ethnoarchaeology research in the Middle East and South Asia. Kramer also advocated for women in anthropology and archaeology, receiving the Squeaky Wheel Award from the Committee on the Status of Women in Anthropology in 1999. Kramer co-wrote Ethnoarchaeology in Action (2001) with Nicolas David, the first comprehensive text on ethnoarchaeology, and received the Award for Excellence in Archaeological Analysis posthumously in 2003.

== Early life ==
Carol Kramer was born in New York City on May 3, 1943, to Aaron Kramer and Katherine Kolodny Kramer. Aaron Kramer was a professor of English at Dowling College and a poet, and her mother, Katherine Kramer, was a social worker. Kramer attended the High School of Music and Art before completing a B.A. at City College of New York in 1964. Kramer started her graduate studies in archaeology at the University of Chicago, but after a year, transferred to the University of Pennsylvania.

As a graduate student, Kramer developed interests in spatial organization and participated in excavations of archaeological sites in Godin Tepe and She Gabi, Iran. Kramer received her Ph.D. from the University of Pennsylvania in 1971. Her doctoral dissertation was titled, “The Habur Ware Ceramic Assemblage of Northern Mesopotamia: An Analysis of its Distribution.”

In the 1960s–1970s, Kramer was briefly married to Christopher Hamlin who was also a graduate student at the University of Pennsylvania. And so some sources related to her life, including some of her own publications, refer to her as Carol Hamlin if they were published during the 1960s and 1970s.

== Fieldwork ==
In 1968, Kramer served as a site supervisor for archaeological excavations in Dinka Tepe and Seh Girdan, Iran as part of the Hasanlu Project directed by Robert H. Dyson Jr. for the University of Pennsylvania and the Metropolitan Museum of Art. Kramer also worked as a site supervisor (in 1967 and 1969) and as the assistant director (in 1971 and 1973) on an archaeological excavation at Godin Tepe, Iran for the Royal Ontario Museum. The Godin Project, as it was called, was directed by Louis D. Levine and T. Cyler Young Jr.

Kramer was a leading researcher in the field of ethnoarchaeology. She participated in her first ethnoarchaeological fieldwork under Ruben Reina, who worked with an urban potter in Antigua, Guatemala. In 1975, Kramer conducted ethnoarchaeological fieldwork in a Kurdish village in the Hamadān Province in Iran. Her ethnoarchaeology research in Iran was published in Ethnoarchaeology: Implications of Ethnography for Archaeology (1979) as “An Archaeological View of a Contemporary Kurdish Village: Domestic Architecture; Household Size, and Wealth. Kramer expanded on this research in her book, Village Ethnoarchaeology: Rural Iran in Archaeological Perspective (1982). Village Ethnoarchaeology (1982) utilized data from her ethnographic fieldwork in Aliabad in 1975, census and map documents published by the Iranian government, and other published ethnographic data.

Kramer hoped to return to Iran to research pottery communities, but she was forced to switch her fieldwork location to India because of the outbreak of the Iranian Revolution in January 1978. Kramer discussed her plans for research in India in an article, “Ceramic Ethnoarchaeology,” in the Annual Review of Archaeology. This article explored the benefits of archaeological studies of ceramics, given their ubiquitous use, good preservation, and role in economic trades and ritual ceremonies. Kramer researched ceramic distribution in Rajasthan in 1980 and from 1982 to 1984. Her research led to many publications related to ceramics and ceramic ethnoarchaeology published between 1991 and 1995, and later her book, Pottery in Rajasthan: Ethnoarchaeology in Two Indian Cities (1997).

Pottery in Rajasthan (1997) includes detailed records of potters’ shops, vessel drawings, and photographs. Kramer's book also provides data on the separation of labor, labor specialization, and gender roles involved in pottery production, which she later discussed in her final paper delivered at a meeting of the Society of American Archaeologists. Her book was reviewed by Charles Kolb from the National Endowment for the Humanities who noted that “the data and conclusions reported in it were valuable contributions to ethnoarchaeology and economic anthropology and served to fill in a void in our comprehension of the intricacies of ceramic production and, particularly, its distribution.

Kramer returned to fieldwork in 1995 as a site supervisor for excavations in Gordion, Turkey, and returned in 1996 to explore the opportunity of conducting ethnoarchaeology research in Yassihöyük and other villages near the area of Gordion, Turkey.

== Ethnoarchaeology research ==
Kramer pioneered the technique of using data from living populations to answer archaeological questions called ethnoarchaeology. Kramer defined ethnoarchaeology as “archaeologically oriented ethnographic research designed to improve the understanding of relationships between patterned human behavior and elements of material culture." Kramer's technique involved conducting ethnographic research to approach questions that archaeological data alone could not answer. Kramer conducted fieldwork during the rise of Processual Archaeology, and her research focused on processual questions and testing hypotheses related to spatial studies, socioeconomic classes, and activity patterns. This method was influenced by scientists utilizing cultural geography approaches at the College University of New York, including Gregory Johnson and Stephen Kowalewski.

Kramer co-wrote Ethnoarchaeology in Action (2001) with Nicolas David, the first comprehensive text on ethnoarchaeology. In this text, David and Kramer detail the history, theory and practice surrounding ethnoarchaeology as an approach instead of a discipline, discussing theoretical implications of the archaeological field, providing examples of ethnoarchaeological practice, and discussing the ethics of ethnographic fieldwork. Ethnoarchaeology in Action (2001) was recognized as an important text in R. Alexander Bentley's Handbook of Archaeological Theories and in Ian Hodder's The Present Past: An Introduction to Anthropology for Archaeologists. Alok Shrotriya notes in an article, “Ceramic Ethno-archaeology and its Applications,” that Kramer carried out ethnoarchaeological research specifically for studying ancient artifacts.

== Professional career ==
Kramer began her teaching career in 1971 at Queens College. From 1974 to 1990, Kramer switched to teaching at Lehman College and then the Graduate Center at the City University of New York. In 1985, Kramer served as a visiting professor at Yale University. From 1986 to 1988, Kramer also taught courses at the University of Arizona supported by a National Science Foundation Visiting Professorship for Women. Kramer was invited by archaeological graduate students at the University of Arizona as part of a National Science Foundation program to fund academic leadership roles for women in departments with few female faculty members.

Kramer became a professor of anthropology at the University of Arizona in 1990, teaching there until her death in 2002. Both Kramer and William Longacre, another faculty member at the University of Arizona, conducted ethnoarchaeology field work in the 1990s. Together, Kramer and Longacre helped to guide Louise Senior's ceramic research published as “The Estimation of Prehistoric Values Cracked Pot Ideas in Archaeology,” in James Skibo, William Walker, and Axel Nielsen's Expanding Archaeology (1995).

Kramer presented her research widely at professional organizations. Kramer gave a 1994 Distinguished Lecture to the Archaeology Section of the American Anthropological Association titled “The Quick and the Dead: Ethnography in and for Archaeology." Nan Rothschild remarked that “her reputation was international; she was a frequent participant in French conferences and lectured in Europe and South Asia." Her last paper, titled “Boys and Girls Together” explored gendered roles involved in pottery creation in Rajasthan, which she presented at the Society of American Archaeology meeting in 2001. Kramer also served as an issue editor for the journal Expedition.

== Advocacy for women in anthropology and archaeology ==
Kramer advocated for the professional development of women in anthropology and archaeology. In 1980, Kramer and her anthropological colleagues, including Roger Sanjek, Rayna Rapp, Carole Vance, and Glenn Peterson, drafted the “Resolution to Implement the 1972 American Anthropological Association Resolution on Fair Practices in the Employment of Women." The group obtained financial support for the resolution calling for the American Anthropological Association (AAA) to censure university departments that hired or promoted few women faculty members. This resolution was passed in 1981, and in that same year, the AAA censured five university departments.

Along with her graduate student Miriam Stark, Kramer published “The Status of Women in Archaeology,” in the American Anthropological Association's newsletter. Stark and Kramer's commentary discussed the state of gender equality in anthropology by looking at gender disparities in the number of graduate students, Ph.D. recipients, funding receipts, and faculty members. This research related to gender inequality in the field of archaeology was published in a special issue of the Archaeological Papers of the American Anthropological Association, focused on “Equity Issues for Women in Anthropology."

From 1973 to 1975, Kramer served as a member of the Committee on the Status of Women in Anthropology (COSWA) and the host and discussion leader at the COSWA's roundtable discussing professional development. Kramer also served as the female archaeologist for the 1998 meeting for the Society for American Archaeology, and in 1999, was awarded the Squeaky Wheel Award by COSWA for her work towards equality for women anthropologists.

== Later life ==
Kramer died on December 3, 2002, in Tucson, Arizona at the age of 59. Kramer received the Award for Excellence in Archaeological Analysis by the Society for American Archaeology a year after her death. She was survived by her sister Laura Kramer. A memorial service with Kramer's colleagues and former students was held on March 9, 2003, and another memorial service was held in New York City on February 16, 2003.

Nan Rothschild wrote an obituary for Carol Kramer that was published in the American Anthropologist in March 2004. After Kramer's death, the Department of Anthropology at the University of Arizona created an endowed scholarship honoring the life and contributions of Carol Kramer. This scholarship is awarded to graduate students interested in studying the archaeology of the ancient Near East or ethnoarchaeology.

In April and May 2015, artist Marjolijn de Wit created an exhibition displayed in the Asya Geisberg Gallery in New York City, New York titled “Pots Are Not People." The exhibition title refers to Kramer's article “Pots and People” published in Mountains and Lowlands: Essays in the Archaeology of Greater Mesopotamia in 1977. De Wit builds on Kramer's argument that “archaeological discoveries signify diverse and complex notions of economy and locale, as opposed to assuming a more static idea of culture." The exhibit was also published into an exhibition catalogue by the same title.

The Carol Kramer Papers are currently housed at the National Anthropological Archives. These papers include Kramer's field notes, correspondence, teaching files, photographs, sound recordings, maps, and botanical specimens representing her ethnoarchaeological fieldwork in Shahabad (also known as Aliabad), Iran and Rajasthan, India. Her papers also include photographs and field notes from her research on the Hasanlu Project at Dalma Tepe, Iran.

== Selected bibliography ==
- 1971 "The 1971 Excavations at She Gabi, Iran," Archaeology 26: pages 224–227.
- 1974 "Seh Gabi, 1973," Archaeology 27: pages 274–277.
- 1977 "Pots and Peoples," in Mountains and Lowlands: Essays in the Archaeology of Greater Mesopotamia, edited by L.D. Levine and T.C. Young Jr. Malibu: Undena Publications.
- 1979 Ebert, James, and Carol Kramer. "An Ethnoarcheological Approach to Reasessing the Meaning of Variability in Stone Tool Assemblages, Implications of Ethnography for Archaeology:" pages 59–74.
- 1979 Kramer, Carol. Ethnoarchaeology: implications of ethnography for archaeology. Columbia University Press.
- 1979 Kramer, Carol. "An archaeological view of a contemporary Kurdish village: domestic architecture, household size, and wealth." Ethnoarchaeology: Implications of Ethnography for Archaeology: pages 139–163.
- 1980 Kramer, Carol. "Estimating prehistoric populations: an ethnoarchaeological approach." L’archéologie de l'Iraq: perspectives et limites de l’interprétation anthropologique des documents, París, CNRS: pages 315–327.
- 1982 Village Ethnoarchaeology: Rural Iran in Archaeological Perspective. New York: Academic Press.
- 1982 Kramer, Carol. "Ethnographic households and archaeological interpretation: a case from Iranian Kurdistan." American Behavioral Scientist 25, number 6: pages 663–675 doi:10.1177/000276482025006005
- 1983 Kramer, Carol. "Spatial organization in contemporary southwest Asian villages and archaeological sampling." TC Young et al: pages 347–68.
- 1985 Kramer, Carol. "Ceramic ethnoarchaeology." Annual review of anthropology: pages 77–102 JSTOR 2155590
- 1985 Kramer, Carol. "Ceramic production and specialization." Paléorient: pages 115–119 JSTOR 41489654
- 1988 "The Status of Women in Archaeology," Anthropology Newsletter 29, number 9: pages 11–12. (co-authored with Miriam Stark) doi:10.1111/an.1988.29.9.1.5
- 1991 “Ceramics in Two Indian Cities,” in Ceramic Ethnoarchaeology, edited by William Longacre. Tucson: University of Arizona Press.
- 1992 Kramer, Carol, and John E. Douglas. "Ceramics, caste, and kin: Spatial relations in Rajasthan, India." Journal of Anthropological Archaeology 11, number 2: pages 187–201 doi:10.1016/0278-4165(92)90021-3
- 1994 Kramer, Carol. "Scale, organization, and function in village and town." Archaeological Views from the Countryside: village communities in early complex societies: pages 207–212.
- 1997 Pottery in Rajasthan: Ethnoarchaeology in Two Indian Cities. Washington, D.C.: Smithsonian Institution Press.
- 2001 Ethnoarchaeology in Action. Cambridge: Cambridge University Press. (co-authored with Nicholas David)
