= ATJ =

ATJ or atj may refer to:

- America's Toughest Jobs, an American reality television show
- Aaron Taylor-Johnson, English actor
- Anya Taylor-Joy, an actress
- Asian Theatre Journal
- atj, the ISO 639-3 code for Atikamekw language, Quebec, Canada
