= Andrew T. Tsubaki =

Japanese theatre scholar

Andrew Takahisa Tsubaki (November 29, 1931 - December 16, 2009) was a Japanese theatre scholar who contributed to the presence and practice of Japanese theatre styles in the Western world.

Tsubaki received extensive education in writing, teaching, and theatrical practices prior to his long-term career at the University of Kansas, a three-decade residency that spanned the years 1968-2000. Tsubaki was most well-known for his pedagogy of Noh, Kyōgen, and Kabuki theatre and scholarly publications and reviews. In 2006, he was awarded the honor of joining the Order of the Sacred Treasure.

== Education ==
Tsubaki graduated in 1954 from Tokyo Gakugei University with a degree in English. After teaching high school in Japan, Tsubaki traveled to Saskatoon, Canada supported by a grant from the University of Saskatchewan, where he obtained a Canadian postgraduate diploma in theatre from 1958-59. Immediately after Saskatchewan, he pursued a Master of Arts in theatre from Texas Christian University and graduated in 1961. Tsubaki concluded his degree-seeking pursuits in 1967 after he received his P.h.D from the University of Illinois at Urbana–Champaign.

== Career ==
While working on his doctoral dissertation, Tsubaki began working at Bowling Green State University in 1964 and stayed in Ohio until 1968, when he received a position in the theatre department at the University of Kansas in Lawrence, KS.

Tsubaki was one of the founding members of an organization that originally was titled the Afro-Asian Theatre Project in 1965, alongside scholars Farley Richmond and James Rodger Brandon. The organization went through several name and structural changes as the years passed and as goals for the members' artistic endeavors shifted. The final title that was accepted in 1987 was the Association for Asian Performance. In 1970, Tsubaki was the volunteer editor for their Afro-Asian Theatre Bulletin, and from 1975-1978 was the chair of the AAP. In 1979, Tsubaki also co-wrote new by-laws and co-published a report with Sears Eldredge that stated secret ballots were to be required for voting in new officers.

== Awards ==
- Order of the Sacred Treasure (2006)

== Publications ==
=== Selected works ===
- "Review of Encyclopedia of Asian Theatre". Asian Theatre Journal. 26 (1): 168–170. 2009. ISSN 0742-5457.
- "Suehirogari (The Fan of Felicity)". Asian Theatre Journal. 24 (1): 1–18. 2007. ISSN 0742-5457.
- "Zeami and the Transition of the Concept of Yūgen: A Note on Japanese Aesthetics". The Journal of Aesthetics and Art Criticism. 30 (1): 55–67. 1971. doi:10.2307/429574. hdl:1808/1139. ISSN 0021-8529.
- "Review of After Apocalypse: Four Japanese Plays of Hiroshima and Nagasaki". World Literature Today. 62 (1): 182–183. 1988. doi:10.2307/40144255. ISSN 0196-3570.
- "Review of The Noh Theatre: Principles and Perspectives". World Literature Today. 58 (3): 476–476. 1984. doi:10.2307/40139606. ISSN 0196-3570.
- "Review of Kabuki Encyclopedia: An English-Language Adaptation of Kabuki Jiten". Monumenta Nipponica. 36 (3): 355–357. 1981. doi:10.2307/2384449. ISSN 0027-0741.
