= James Rodger Brandon =

American academic (1927–2015)

- Born: 1927; Mazomanie, Wisconsin, U.S.
- Died: September 19, 2015 (aged 87–88); Honolulu, Hawaii, U.S.
- Education: University of Wisconsin–Madison (B.Ph., M.S., Ph.D.)
- Occupation: Professor of Asian theater
- Years active: 1968–2000
- Spouse: Reiko Mochinaga Brandon (m. 1960s–2015; his death)

James Rodger Brandon (1927 – 19 September 2015) was an American academic who was a professor of Asian theater specializing in Kabuki and Sanskrit drama theater at the University of Hawaiʻi at Mānoa. He was a member of the generation of scholars who first brought Asian theater to English-speaking audiences in the postwar period, translating dozens of plays and directing many performances, some of which toured widely throughout the United States.

== Biography ==
Brandon was born in Mazomanie, Wisconsin. He graduated from the University of Wisconsin–Madison with a B.Ph. degree in 1948, and a M.S. degree in 1949.

He was drafted into the military in 1950 and was stationed in Japan and Korea during the Korean War. It was with only two days left before his tour ended and he returned to the United States that he saw his first kabuki performance. It was this performance that awakened his interest in Asian theater. He returned to the University of Wisconsin–Madison to take a PhD in theater on the G.I. Bill in 1955.

After completing his PhD, he entered the United States Foreign Service, where he was a cultural affairs officer stationed in Jakarta, Indonesia from 1955 to 1957. The Japanese government awarded him the Order of the Rising Sun, Golden Rays with Rosette, Imperial Decoration in 1994.

== Scholarly contributions ==
In 1965, along with Andrew T. Tsubaki and Farley Richmond, he founded the Afro-Asian Theater Project, which after a series of reorganizations has been known since 1987 as the Association for Asian Performance.

He co-founded the Asian Theatre Journal with Elizabeth Wichmann-Walczak in 1984.

== Bibliography ==
=== Selected works by Brandon ===
Authored books

- Brandon, James R. (2008). Kabuki's Forgotten War: 1931-1945. Honolulu, Hawaii: University of Hawaiʻi Press. ISBN 978-0-8248-3200-1.
- Brandon, James R. (1976). Brandon's Guide To Theater in Asia: Where To Go, How To Get There and What To Expect. Honolulu, Hawaii: University of Hawaiʻi Press. ISBN 978-0824803698.
- Brandon, James R. (1967). Theatre in Southeast Asia. Cambridge, Massachusetts: Harvard University Press. ISBN 0-674-87587-7.

Edited books

- Brandon, James R., ed. (1993). The Cambridge Guide to Asian Theatre. Cambridge: Cambridge University Press. ISBN 978-0521416238.
- Brandon, James R., ed. (1982). Chūshingura: Studies in Kabuki and the Puppet Theater. Honolulu, Hawaii: University of Hawaiʻi Press. ISBN 978-0824807931.
- Brandon, James R.; Van M. Baumer, Rachel, eds. (1981). Sanskrit Drama in Performance. Honolulu, Hawaii.: University of Hawaiʻi Press. ISBN 81-208-0772-3.

Translations

- Brandon, James R.; Leiter, Samuel L., eds. (2003). Kabuki Plays on Stage, Volume 4: Restoration and Reform, 1872-1905. Honolulu, Hawaii: University of Hawaiʻi Press. ISBN 978-0824825744.
- Brandon, James R.; Leiter, Samuel L., eds. (2002). Kabuki Plays on Stage, Volume 3: Darkness and Desire, 1804-1864. Honolulu, Hawaii: University of Hawaiʻi Press. ISBN 978-0824824556.
- Brandon, James R.; Leiter, Samuel L., eds. (2002). Kabuki Plays on Stage, Volume 2: Villainy and Vengeance, 1773-1799. Honolulu, Hawaii: University of Hawaiʻi Press. ISBN 978-0824824136.
- Brandon, James R.; Leiter, Samuel L., eds. (2002). Kabuki Plays on Stage, Volume 1: Brilliance and Bravado, 1697-1766. Honolulu, Hawaii: University of Hawaiʻi Press. ISBN 978-0824824037.
- Brandon, James R., ed. (1975). Kabuki: Five Classic Plays. Cambridge, Massachusetts: Harvard University Press. ISBN 978-0674304857.
- Brandon, James R., ed. (1970). On Thrones of Gold: Three Javanese Shadow Plays. Cambridge, Massachusetts: Harvard University Press. ISBN 978-0824814250.
- Brandon, James R.; Niwa, Tamako, eds. (1966). Two Kabuki Plays: The Subscription List and the Zen Substitute. New York: Samuel French.

Academic journal articles

- Brandon, James R. (Spring 2014). "'Democratic Kabuki' for a 'Democratic Japan': 1945-1946". Asian Theatre Journal. 31 (1). University of Hawaiʻi Press: 103–125. doi:10.1353/atj.2014.0004. JSTOR 43187289. S2CID 144722915.
- Brandon, James R. (Fall 2011). "The Association for Asian Performance: A Brief History". Asian Theatre Journal. 28 (2). University of Hawaiʻi Press: 281–308. doi:10.1353/atj.2011.0037. JSTOR 41306492. S2CID 143955833.
- Brandon, James R. (Spring 2006). "Myth and Reality: A Story of Kabuki during American Censorship, 1945-1949". Asian Theatre Journal. 23 (1). University of Hawaiʻi Press: 1–110. doi:10.1353/atj.2006.0003. JSTOR 4137090. S2CID 162254407.
- Brandon, James R. (December 1960). "Toward a Middle-View of Chekhov". Educational Theatre Journal. 12 (4). Johns Hopkins University Press: 270–275. doi:10.2307/3204553. JSTOR 3204553.

== See also ==
- Javanese shadow puppetry
- Chūshingura
