= Otis Willard Freeman =

Otis Willard Freeman (1889–1964) was an American academic, writer and geographer.

Freeman was the founding President of the Association of Pacific Coast Geographers (APCG); and he was also the first editor of the Yearbook of the Association of Pacific Coast Geographers.

Freeman earned an undergraduate degree Albion College in 1910. He continued his studies, earning a master's degree in science from the University of Michigan in 1913 and post-doctoral work at Northwestern University in 1924. He joined the faculty at the University of Hawaii, which provided an opportunity to research and publish books about the geography of Hawaii. He earned his doctorate from Clark University in 1929.

Freeman's early experience led to a position on the faculty of Eastern Washington University, where he was named Professor of Geology and Geography. In 1951, he became President of Eastern Washington University. He retired from the faculty in 1953.

== Honors ==
- APCG Distinguished Service Award, 1958.

== Select works ==
- 1927—The Economic Geography of Hawaii. Honolulu: University of Hawaii Press. OCLC 1295153
- 1935—The Hawaiian Islands. Bloomington, Illinois: McKnight & McKnight. OCLC 394853
- 1951—Geography of the Pacific. New York: Wiley. OCLC 415089
- 1954—The Pacific Northwest: an Overall Appreciation (with Howard Hanna Martin). New York: Wiley. OCLC 1060360
- 1958—World geography (with ohn Wesley Morris). New York: McGraw-Hill. OCLC 1422166
