= Eliot Deutsch =

American philosopher (1931–2020)

Eliot Sandler Deutsch (January 8, 1931 – June 28, 2020) was an American philosopher, teacher, and writer. He made important contributions to the understanding and appreciation of Eastern philosophies in the West through his many works on comparative philosophy and aesthetics. He was a Professor Emeritus of Philosophy at the University of Hawaiʻi at Mānoa.

== Biography ==
After Deutsch received his doctorate from Columbia University he was an associate professor of Philosophy from 1960 to 1967 and was a chair in the Department of Philosophy at the Rensselaer Polytechnic Institute. In the summer of 1966, Deutsch was a visiting professor at the University of Chicago. In 1967, Deutsch joined the University of Hawaiʻi as professor of philosophy. He was the editor (from 1967 to 1987) of the international journal Philosophy East and West, director of the Sixth Eastern Philosophers conference, as well as the past president of the Society for Asian and Comparative Philosophy. Fall of 1985 Deutsch was at Harvard University as a visiting professor there. In 1987 until 1989 he was the director as the Sixth East-West Philosophers' Conference. From 1991 through 1996, he held position as a graduate chair in the Department of Philosophy at the University of Hawaiʻi. Deutsch was a visiting fellow at Clare Hall the University of Cambridge in England from July to December 1998 and was elected a Life Member in 1999. From 1967 through 2006 Deutsch has been a professor of philosophy at the University of Hawaiʻi at Mānoa as well as spending some of those years as chair.

Deutsch was the author of 16 books, including; On Truth: An Ontological Theory; Advaita Vedanta: A Philosophical Reconstruction; Studies in Comparative Aesthetics; Creative Being: The Crafting of Person and World; Religion and Spirituality; Essays on the Nature of Art; and Persons and Valuable Worlds. Deutsch also had many publications as well as being an invited lecturer at numerous universities and colleges in Asia, Europe, and the Americas including Oxford, Lucknow University, Boston University, Fudan University (Shanghai), Madras University, the University of Rajasthan, Nanjing University, and the University of Chicago. Professor Deutsch had been the recipient of Fellowships from the American Institute of Indian Studies, The American Council of Learned Societies and the National Endowment for the Humanities. He was also a past president of the Society for Asian and Comparative Philosophy. Professor Deutsch recently was the recipient of the University of Hawaiʻi Regent's Medal of Distinction for exceptional contributions to his field. Deutsch lived in Hawaii after retirement.

== Accomplishments ==
Professor Deutsch attended the University of Wisconsin from 1948 to 1952 obtaining his bachelor's degree there. He attended the University of Chicago in 1952 and Harvard University from 1952 to 1953. He completed his Ph.D. from 1956 to 1960 at Columbia University.

Professor Deutsch was awarded his first Fellowship in 1963 as a Faculty Fellow at the American Institute of Indian Studies in India. From 1965 through 1967, he was a New York State Faculty Scholar in International Studies. He was awarded a Senior Fellowship from the National Endowment for the Humanities from 1973 to 1974. In December 1975, the American Council of Learned Societies awarded him a travel grant to attend World Congress of Philosophy in Delhi and a meeting of International Society for Metaphysics. In 1984, he was Principal Investigator, Director, at the NEH Summer Institute in Comparative Philosophy. The University of California at Santa Barbara awarded him visiting fellow for the Interdisciplinary Center for the Humanities in May 1988. From 1991 to 1992, he was the Project Director for "Alternative Rationalities" for the Hawaii Committee for the Humanities Grant. In 1994, he was Principal Investigator and Director at the NEH Summer Institute in South Asian Culture and Civilization. In October 2002, Professor Deutsch was awarded the Degree of Vedanta Sudhara by The International Congress of Vedanta. Deutsch was awarded the University of Hawaiʻi's Highest Award, The Regents Medal of Distinction, in July 2005.

== Works ==
=== Books ===
- The Bhagavad Gita (translator), (Holt, Rinehart and Winston, 1968)
- Advaita Vedanta: A Philosophical Reconstruction, (University of Hawaiʻi Press, 1969)
- Studies in Comparative Aesthetics, (University of Hawaiʻi Press, 1975)
- On Truth: An Ontological Theory, (University of Hawaiʻi Press, 1979)
- Personhood, Creativity, and Freedom, (University of Hawaiʻi Press, 1982)
- Interpreting Across Boundaries, (Motilal Banarsidass, 1989)
- Culture and Modernity: East-West Philosophic Perspectives, (University of Hawaiʻi Press, 1991)
- A Companion to World Philosophies, (Wiley-Blackwell, 1991)
- Religion and Spirituality, (State University of New York Press, 1995)
- Essays on the Nature of Art, (State University of New York Press, 1996)
- Introduction to World Philosophies, (Prentice Hall, 1996)
- Classical Sociological Theory, (Blackwell Publishing Limited, 2002)
- Persons and Valuable Worlds: A Global Philosophy, (Rowman & Littlefield Publishers, 2002)
- The Essential Vedanta: A New Source Book of Advaita Vedanta, (World Wisdom, 2004)
- Timeless in Time: Sri Ramana Maharshi, (World Wisdom, 2006)
- Introduction to Asian Philosophy, (Prentice Hall, 2006)
- The Japanese Arts and Self-Cultivation, (State University of New York Press, 2007)

=== Articles ===
In addition, Deutsch had written more than 100 articles and reviews for professional journals. His works had been translated into French, Italian, Spanish, Russian, Chinese, Korean, and Japanese.

- "Sri Aurobindo's Interpretation of Spiritual Experience: A Critique," International Philosophical Quarterly, IV, 4 (December 1964). Excerpted in Twentieth-Century Literary Criticism, edited by Jennifer Gariery (New York: Gale Research, Inc., 1997)
- "The Nature of Scripture," Vedanta Kesari, LI, 9 (January 1965).
- "Karma as a 'Convenient Fiction' in Advaita Ved_nta," Philosophy East and West, XV, l (January 1965).
- "The Justification of Hindu Polytheism in Advaita Ved_nta," East West Review, I, 3 (February 1965).
- "_akti in Medieval Hindu Sculpture," Journal of Aesthetics and Art Criticism, XXIV, l (Fall, 1965).
- "Levels of Being," Darshana International, V, 4 (October 1965).
- "The Self in Advaita Ved_nta," International Philosophical Quarterly, VI, l (March, 1966).
- "Types of Philosophical Problems in Classical Vedānta," abstract in Proceedings of Twenty Seventh International Congress of Orientalists, Ann Arbor, Michigan, August, 1967.(Wiesbaden: Otto Harrassowitz, 1971).
- "Western Approaches to Comparative Philosophy," Proceedings of the Indian Philosophical Congress, Banares, India, December, 1967.
- "Aesthetics East and West: Tentative Conclusions and Unresolved Problems," Philosophy East and West, XIX, 3 (July 1969).
- "Introduction to Violence and Non Violence East and West," Philosophy East and West. XIX, 2 (April 1969).
- "Speaking About God," Journal of Religious Studies (Punjabi University) I, l (September 1969).
- "Commentary on J. L. Mehta's 'Heidegger and the Comparison of Indian and Western Philosophy,'" Philosophy East and West, XX, 3 (July, 1970).
- "Philosophy and Freedom of Consciousness," in Philosophy: Theory and Practice, Proceedings of the International Seminar on World Philosophy, edited by T. M. P. Mahadevan (Madras: The University of Madras, 1974).
- "Commentary on Dr. Fernand Brunner's 'Theory and Practice in the Evolution of Western Thought'," in same.
- "Vedanta and Ecology," Indian Philosophical Annual, Volume 6, 1970. Centre of Advanced Study in philosophy, University of Madras.
- "The Nature of Freedom," in same.
- "The Mufti-Leveled Ontology of Advaita Ved_nta," in Studies in the Languages and Culture of South Asia, edited by Edwin Gerow and Margery D. Land (Seattle and London: University of Washington Press, 1973).
- "Some Reflections on Rasa", in Festschrift for Professor T. M. P. Mahadevan, edited by H. D. Lewis, Madras, 1974.
- "On the Concept of Art," Journal of Chinese Philosophy, 3 (1976).
- "Vidy_ and Avidy_, Proceedings: World Philosophy Congress, New Delhi, 1976.
- "On Meaning," in Self, Knowledge and Freedom, edited by J. N. Mohanty and S. P. Banerjee (Calcutta: World Press, 1978).
- "A Reply to 'How to Help Advaita Ved_nta Refute Itself'," Insight: A Journal of World Religions, II.2 (Winter 1977 78).
- "Causality and Creativity," International Philosophical Quarterly, XVIII, no. l (March, 1978), and in Man and Nature, edited by George F. McLean (Oxford University Press,1978).
- "Reflections on Some Aspects of the Theory of Rasa," in Sanskrit Drama in Performance, edited by Rachel van M. Baumer and James R. Brandon (University Press of Hawaii, 1981).
- "A Radical Discontinuity in Being: A Dialogue," in Rationality and Philosophy, ed. by V. K. Bharadwaja (New Delhi: Northern Book Centre, 1984).
- "On Art and Religion," in Religious Pluralism, Boston University Institute for Philosophy and Religion Series, edited by Leroy S. Rouner, (Notre Dame: University of Notre Dame), 1984.
- "The Bhagavad Git_," article for Encyclopedia of Religion, edited by Mircea Eliade, Macmillan, 1985.
- "The Ontological Power of Speech," Journal of Chinese Philosophy, Volume 12, Fall, 1985.
- "Knowing Religiously," in Knowing Religiously, edited by Leroy S. Rouner (Notre Dame: University of Notre Dame Press, 1985). And in philosophy, Religion, and Contemporary Life, edited by Leroy S. Rouner and James R. Langford (Notre Dame: University of Notre Dame Press, 1996).
- "Participation: The Metaphysical Grounding of Social Relations," in philosophy, Society and Action (Delhi, 1985). Translated into Chinese, in Philosophical Research, Beijing, number 5, 1986.
- "A Metaphysical Grounding for Natural Reverence: East West," Environmental Ethics, Volume 8, Number 4, Winter 1986.
- "Breugel and Ma Yüan: Principles of Comparative Criticism," in A Selection of Famous Works on Western Aesthetics of the Twentieth Century (Ershi shiji xifang meisue mingzhu xuan) Shanghai: Fudan University Press, 1988; Spanish Translation, in Esteticas: Occidente Y Otras Culturas, (Malaga: Contrastes, 2005).
- "Time and History: East and West," Radhakrishnan Centenary Volume. Indian Council of Philosophical Research, 1990.
- "Community as Ritual Participation", in On Community, edited by Leroy S. Rouner (Notre Dame: University of Notre Dame Press, 1991)
- "The Concept of the Body," in Self as Body in Asian Thought and Practice, edited by Thomas P. Kasulis (Albany: State University of New York Press, 1992) and in Phenomenology East and West: Essays in Honor of J. N. Mohanty (Kluwer Academic Publishers and Motilal Banarsidass), 1993.
- "On the Comparative Study of the Self." in Selves, People and Persons, edited by Leroy S. Rouner (Notre Dame: Notre Dame University Press), 1992.
- "The Person as Knower and Known," Journal of Indian Council of Philosophical Research, Volume X, number 1, 1993.
- "Truth and Mythology," in Myths and Fictions, edited by Shlomo Biderman and Ben-Ami Scharfstein (Leiden: E. J. Brill, 1993).
- "Creative Friendship," in The Changing Face of Friendship, edited by Leroy S. Rouner (Notre Dame: University of Notre Dame Press, 1994).
- "Self-Deception: A Comparative Study" in Self and Deception, edited by Roger T. Ames and Vimal Dissanayake (Albany, New York: State University of New York Press, 1996).
- "Outline of an Advaita Vedānta Aesthetics," in Relativism, Suffering and Beyond, edited by P. Bilimoria and J.N. Mohanty (New Delhi: Oxford University Press, 1996).
- "Face to Face: Crossing the Boundaries of Gender and Culture," University of Sidney, 1997.
- "Loneliness and Solitude," in Loneliness, edited by Leroy S. Rouner (Notre Dame: University of Notre Dame Press, 1998).
- "Comparative Aesthetics," in Encyclopedia of Aesthetics, Michael Kelly (ed) (Oxford and New York: Oxford University Press), 1998. Italian Translation in Il paesaggio dell'estetica (Università di Siena, 1998); Lithuania Translation in III, Vilnius.
- "Eliot Deutsch Responds" in The Aesthetic Turn: Reading Eliot Deutsch on Comparative Philosophy, edited by Roger T. Ames (Chicago: Open Court Publishing Company, 2000).
- "Rationality and Tradition(s)," in The Empirical and the Transcendental: A Fusion of Horizons, edited by Bina Gupta (Lanham: Rowman & Littlefield Publishers, Inc., 2000).
- "Seyyed Hossein Nasr's Philosophy of Art," in The Philosophy of Seyyed Hossein Nasr, The Library of Living Philosophers, Volume XXVII, edited by Lewis E. Hahn, Randall E. Auxier, and Lucian W. Stone Jr. (Chicago: Open Court Publishers, 2001).
- Interpreting Artworks: Prolegomenon to a Cross-Cultural Philosophy in Aesthetics and Philosophy of Art Studies Hermeneutic, in Frontiers of Transculturality in Contemporary Aesthetics (Turin, Italy, Trauben, 2001).
- A Comparative Philosophy as Creative Philosophy, in American Philosophical Association Newsletter, Volume 2, Number 1, Fall 2002.
- Foreword to Mariette Stepaniants, Introduction to Eastern Thought (Altamira Press, 2002).
- A Comparative Philosophy: Past, Present, Future in Asianet Exchange, Volume XI, Number 1 Fall 2003.
- A Holy Otherness; Religious Differences Revisited, in The Stranger's Religion: Fascination and Fear, edited by Anna Lännström (Notre Dame: University of Notre Dame Press), 2004.
- A Memorial Tribute to Leroy Rouner, Philosophy East and West, Volume 56, Number 3, July 2006.
