= Nicholas O'Connell =

American journalist, novelist, editor and publisher

Nicholas O'Connell (born March 6, 1957) is an American journalist, novelist, editor and publisher. He was born to Marie Katherine O'Connell and Nicholas Brown O'Connell in Seattle, Washington. Nicholas was raised in Bellevue, Washington with 4 other siblings.

He was lauded for his recent nonfiction book, Crush: My Year as an Apprentice Winemaker (Potomac Books, 2025), debut novel, The Storms of Denali, and for his great understanding of mountaineering; and also for his book On Sacred Ground, for his deep-rooted connection with nature and Northwestern U.S. literature.

He is the publisher of The Writer's Workshop Review, an online literary magazine and founder of The Writer's Workshop, an on-campus and online writing program in Seattle.

== Biography ==
O'Connell was born on March 6, 1957, in Seattle, Washington to parents Nicholas and Marie O'Connell.

He attended Amherst College, receiving his B.A. in French in 1980. He received his Master's degree (MFA) in creative writing in 1985 from the University of Washington, where he also received his Ph.D. in English in 1996.

His first real newspaper job was as a reporter at the Whidbey News Times in Oak Harbor, Washington in 1980 and '81. He worked as a general assignment reporter for the Ellensburg Daily-Record from 1981 to 1982 in Ellensburg, Washington, as a fiction editor of the Seattle Review from 1983 to 1989, and as a copy editor for Fishing and Hunting News (Outdoor Empire Publishing) from 1982 to 1994. He was an instructor at the University of Washington from 1987 to 2005, and he founded The Writer's Workshop in 2001, where he has remained a teacher since.

His work has been printed in a myriad of publications, including Newsweek, Gourmet, Saveur, Outside, GO, National Geographic Adventure, Condé Nast Traveler, Food & Wine, The New York Times, The Wall Street Journal, Sierra, The Wine Spectator, Commonweal, Image, and more.

O'Connell is also a mountaineer, having ascended mountains all over the world, including Mt. Rainier, the Matterhorn, Mt. Blanc, the Marmolada, Island Peak in the Himalayas, and Alaska's Denali, N. America's highest mountain. His experiences climbing helped shape his writing style, and the idea for his novel.

He and his wife live in Seattle and have three children. He is currently the publisher/editor of the online literary magazine, The Writer's Workshop Review.

O'Connell is a member of the Authors Guild of America, National Association of Scholars, and Association for the Study of Literature and Environment.

His works have been translated and published in Japan, England, Italy, Canada, Poland, and the Czech Republic

== Critical comments ==
- Ellen Emry Hetzel, of the Seattle Times wrote, concerning O'Connell's novel, "Among other achievements, Seattle climber and author Nicholas O'Connell helps us understand the mountaineer mentality ... O'Connell finds his larger theme in what can happen when trust is broken. Even those of us who don't climb mountains can step into his fictional character's crampons."
- "Author Nicholas O'Connell brings readers along for every painful and heart-stopping step of the way up Denali," said Hikari Loftus of Deseret News. "O'Connell's knowledge of climbing makes the story believable and relatable to climbers and hikers. The story he writes makes this tale of survival and risks hard to put down."
- Amherst Magazine book reviewer, DeWitt Henry, said "this is a fully imagined, thought-provoking and moving debut."
- In Yearbook of the Association of Pacific Coast Geographers, Ralph K. Allen reviewed O'Connell's On Sacred Ground, saying "Nicholas O'Connell's tightly written history of the Pacific Northwest's literature is an excellent compass for students, teachers, and the general public to use as a reference, story, or jumping-off point for further research into the spatial character of the Northwest."
- John Marshall, a critic from the Seattle Post-Intelligencer, said "(O'Connell) may be the most successful yet in analyzing the region's literature ... As "On Sacred Ground" illuminates, Northwest literature has come full circle and returned to its native American roots, recalling stories and legends that were rife with reverence for the natural world and all its inhabitants.
- David Stevenson of the American Alpine Club, said "Many of these climbers are writers themselves, well over half with books to their credit (Messner and Bonington being virtual publishing industries unto themselves). But even these familiar faces benefit from O'Connell's careful questioning and editing."
- Bob Speik, of Traditional Mountaineering said, "Beyond Risk is the best book I have found on traditional climbing ethics. It is one of the best reads of the adventure books on traditional mountaineering and climbing that I have enjoyed."

== Awards ==
- Society of Professional Journalist First Place for Feature Story Writing in 1981.
- Society of Professional Journalist First Place for Magazine Travel Writing in 2007.
- Pacific Northwest Booksellers Award (1988) for At the Field's End: Interviews with 22 Pacific Northwest Writers.
- Washington State Governor's Award (1988) for At the Field's End: Interviews with 22 Pacific Northwest Writers.

== Published works ==
=== Novels ===
- The Storms of Denali. University of Alaska Press. July 15, 2012. ISBN 978-1602231849.

=== Nonfiction ===
- Beyond Risk: Conversations with Climbers. Mountaineers Books. 1995. ISBN 9780898864571.
- At the Field's End: Interviews with 22 Pacific Northwest Writers. University of Washington Press. 1998. ISBN 9780295977232.
- On Sacred Ground: The Spirit of Place in Pacific Northwest Literature. University of Washington Press. 2003. ISBN 9780295994789.
