= E. Alison Kay =

E. Alison Kay (1928 – 9 June 2008) was a malacologist, environmentalist, and professor at the University of Hawaiʻi at Mānoa. She was born in 'Ele'ele and grew up on the island of Kauai in the Territory of Hawaii, graduated from Punahou School in 1946, and obtained her first B.A. from Mills College in 1950. She then went on to earn another B.A. in 1952 and an M.A. in 1956 from Cambridge University as a Fulbright scholar before returning to the University of Hawaiʻi at Mānoa, where she completed her dissertation in 1957. She is best known for her work, Hawaiian Marine Shells (1979).

== Career ==
Her research focused on marine mollusks in the Indo-Pacific region, and she regularly offered a graduate course in taxonomy and systematics, and another in biogeography, emphasizing in particular the ecology and distribution of island mollusks. Her dissertation was on cowrie shells and Cypraea alisonae was named for her.

She believed strongly in general education, was assigned to the Dept. of General Science until 1982 (when she moved to Zoology), and was one of the most engaging lecturers in the large survey courses taught at the Varsity Theater off-campus. In later years, she taught a popular course in the natural history of the Hawaiian Islands, for which she edited a textbook in 1994. She also served at various times as dean of graduate students, as department head, and as a member of the Faculty Senate. She was the longest-serving editor in chief of the journal Pacific Science, overseeing almost every issue between 1972 and 2000.

Active in many environmental projects, she helped found the Save Diamond Head Association, conducted research on the effects of the atomic bomb in the Marshall Islands, and did pioneering research on micromollusks for biomonitoring. Her research on the ecology of opihi (limpets) helped shape state regulations limiting opihi collection.

== Selected works ==
- 1996. An atlas of Cowrie Radulae (Mollusca: Gastropoda: Cypraeoidea: Cypraeidae). Festivus v. 28, Suppl., 179 pp.(with Hugh Bradner).
- 1994. A Natural History of the Hawaiian Islands: Selected Readings II (Honolulu: University of Hawaiʻi Press), ISBN 978-0-8248-1659-9.
- 1991. Shells of Hawaii (Honolulu: University of Hawaiʻi Press) (with Olive Schoenberg-Dole), ISBN 978-0-8248-1316-1.
- 1991. The marine mollusks of the Galapagos: Determinants of insular marine fauna," in Galapagos Marine Invertebrates (New York: Plenum Press), pages 235-252.
- 1990. "The Cypraeidae of the Indo-Pacific: Cenozoic phylogeny and biogeography," Bulletin of Marine Science 47: pages 23–24.
- 1987. "Endemism and evolution in Hawaiian Marine invertebrates," Trends in Ecology and Evolution 2:183-186 (with Steve Palumbi).
- 1987. "The Mollusca of Enewetak Atoll, Marshall Islands," in The Natural History of Enewetak Atoll (Washington, D.C.: U.S. Department of Energy) (with S. Johnson).
- 1984. "Patterns of speciation in the Indo-West Pacific," in Biogeography of the Tropical Pacific (Association of Systematics Collections and B.P. Bishop Museum), pages 15–31.
- 1980. "Little worlds of the Pacific: An essay on Pacific Basin biogeography," Harold L. Lyon Arboretum, University of Hawaiʻi, Lecture Number 9, pages 1–40.
- 1979. Hawaiian Marine Shells: Reef and Shore Fauna of Hawaii, Section 4: Mollusca (Honolulu: B.P. Bishop Museum Press).
- 1978. Molluscan distribution patterns at Canton Atoll. Atoll Research Bulletin Number 221: pages 160–169.
