= Philosophy East and West =

- Discipline: Philosophy
- Language: English
- Edited by: Franklin Perkins

Publication details
- History: 1951–present
- Publisher: University of Hawaii Press (United States)
- Frequency: Quarterly

Standard abbreviations
- ISO 4: Philos. East West

Indexing
- ISSN: 0031-8221 (print); 1529-1898 (web)
- LCCN: 53016276
- JSTOR: 00318221
- OCLC no.: 01485347

Links
- Journal homepage; Online access at Project MUSE

Philosophy East and West is a peer-reviewed academic journal covering non-Western traditions of philosophy in relation to Anglo-American philosophy, integrating the discipline with literature, science, and social practices. Special issues have been devoted to topics as diverse as "Problems of the Self", "Existence: An East-West Dialogue", "Philosophy and Revolution", and "Environmental Ethics".

The journal was established in 1951 by Charles A. Moore as an outgrowth of the work of the East-West Philosophers' Conferences sponsored by the University of Hawaiʻi Department of Philosophy. It was also the first journal to bear the imprint of the University of Hawaii Press, established in 1947. In 1967 the editorship passed to Eliot Deutsch, in 1986 to Roger T. Ames, and in 2017 to Franklin Perkins, all affiliated with the University of Hawaiʻi.

Philosophy East and West appears quarterly in January, April, July, and October. Its first electronic edition appeared in 2001 on Project MUSE. Back volumes up to three years behind the current volume are available at JSTOR.
