= Roger T. Ames =

Canadian philosopher and author (born 1947)

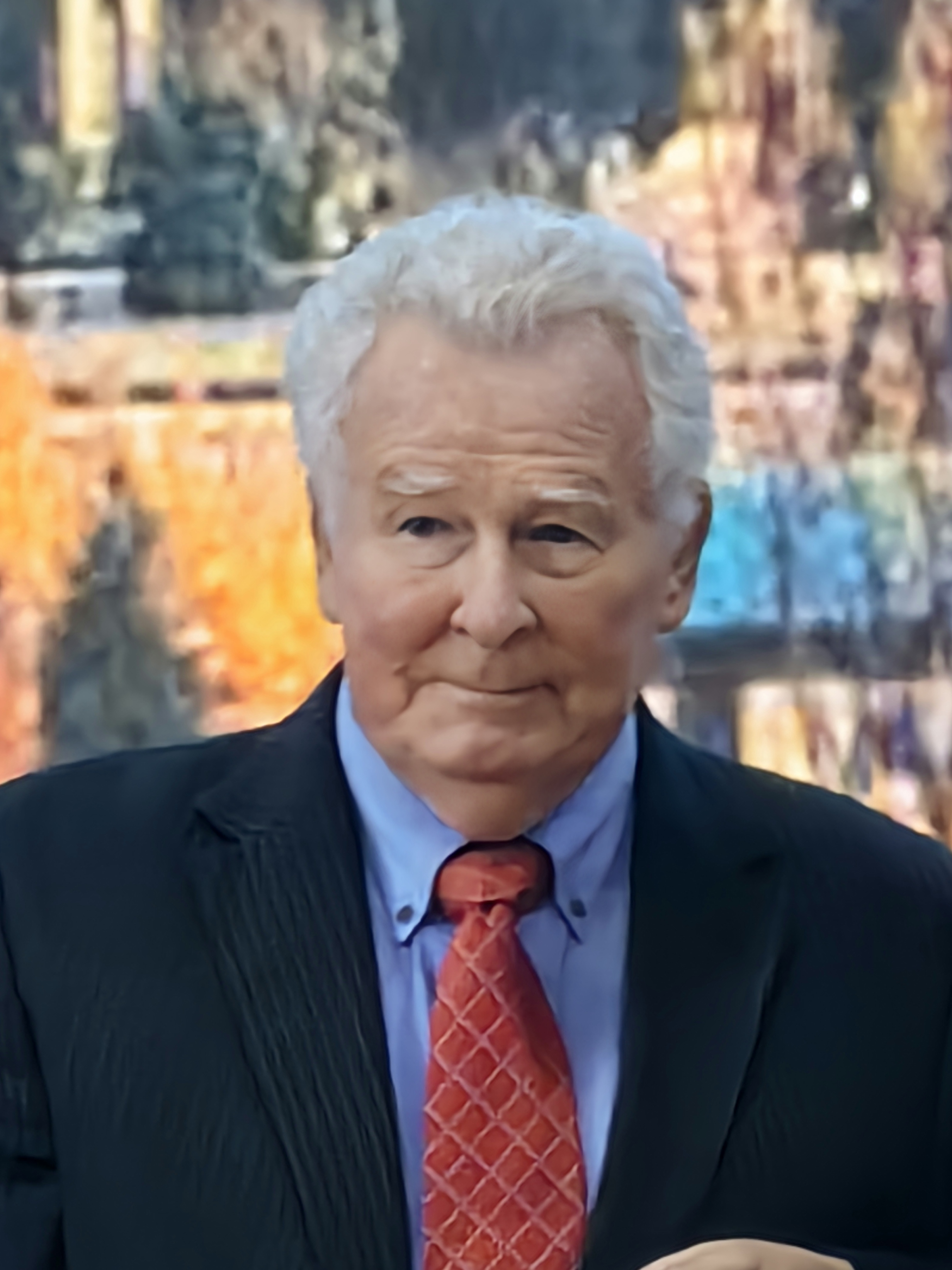
- Born: December 12, 1947 (age 78); Toronto, Ontario, Canada

Education
- Education: University of British Columbia (BA, MA); National Taiwan University (MA); SOAS University of London (PhD)

Philosophical work
- Institutions: University of Hawaii at Manoa; Peking University

Roger T. Ames (born 12 December 1947) is a Canadian-born philosopher, translator, and author. He is Humanities Chair Professor at Peking University in Beijing, China, Professor Emeritus of Philosophy at the University of Hawaiʻi at Mānoa, and a Berggruen Fellow. He is known for developing a process-relational reading of early Chinese thought and for his programmatic critique of interpreting Chinese philosophy through fixed Western metaphysical categories, especially in his work on Confucian role ethics and his philosophically oriented translations of classical texts.

== Biography ==
Roger Ames was born in Toronto, Canada, and raised in England and Vancouver. He is married with two sons. He received his bachelor's degree from the University of British Columbia (UBC) where he studied philosophy and Chinese language. While attending UBC, he took the opportunity to spend one academic year at the Chinese University of Hong Kong, his first exposure to China.

After graduating from UBC, Ames began his graduate work at National Taiwan University (1970–1972), where he studied with Yang Youwei (楊有維) and earned a master's degree in philosophy. He returned to UBC and obtained another master's degree (1973), then he spent two years living in Japan. In 1975, he began his Ph.D. at the School of Oriental and African Studies (SOAS) at the University of London, where he studied under the tutelage of D. C. Lau. He completed his Ph.D. thesis in 1978, titled The "Chu Shu" chapter of the Huai-Nan-Tzu: The sources and orientation of its political thought. That same year, he accepted an offer for an assistant professorship from the University of Hawaiʻi at Mānoa, and he remained there until he retired in 2016. He is currently Humanities Chair Professor at Peking University in Beijing, China.

== Accomplishments ==
While a member of the faculty at the University of Hawaiʻi at Mānoa (UHM), Ames joined Eliot Deutsch, already a prominent academic and advocate of Chinese and comparative philosophy, and others to continue the tradition begun by Charles A. Moore and Wing-Tsit Chan to establish UHM as the hub for non-Western and comparative philosophy and intellectual exchange in the United States. Ames became the editor of the academic journal Philosophy East and West in 1987, the editor of the book review publication China Review International, the editor and co-editor (with David L. Hall) of the "Chinese Philosophy and Culture" Series as well as (with Paul J. D'Ambrosio) the "Translating China" series with State University of New York Press. He also served as Director for the Center for Chinese Studies at UHM and Co-Director (with Peter D. Hershock) for the Asian Studies Development Program (ASDP), and as Director and Co-Director of the East-West Philosophers' Conferences, the largest gathering of non-Western and comparative philosophers, with as many as 300 presenters, held in Honolulu, Hawaiʻi, in 1995, 2000, 2005, 2011, and 2016.

Ames has been a visiting professor at National University of Singapore and the Chinese University of Hong Kong, and a Fulbright Professor at Wuhan University and Peking University. He has received many awards, including the Confucian Culture Award at the 2013 World Congress of Confucianism in Beijing, and the Huilin Culture Award from Beijing Normal University in China in 2016.

== Selected works ==
Ames has written around 100 scholarly articles, published in prominent academic journals in the United States and abroad.

- Sunzi: The Art of Warfare (1993)
- The Art of Rulership: A Study of Ancient Chinese Political Thought (1994)
- Confucian Role Ethics: A Vocabulary (2011)
- Human Becomings: Theorizing Persons for Confucian Role Ethics (2020)
- A Sourcebook in Classical Confucian Philosophy (2023)
- Living Chinese Philosophy: Zoetology as First Philosophy (2024)

=== With D. C. Lau ===
- Sun Pin: The Art of Warfare (1996)
- Yuan Dao: Tracing the Dao to Its Source (1998)
- Sun Bin: The Art of Warfare: A Translation of the Classic Chinese Work of Philosophy and Strategy (2003)

=== With David L. Hall ===
- Thinking Through Confucius (1987)
- Anticipating China: Thinking Through the Narrative of Chinese and Western Culture (1995)
- Thinking From the Han: Self, Truth, and Transcendence in Chinese and Western Culture (1998)
- Democracy of the Dead: Dewey, Confucius, and the Hope for Democracy in China (1999)
- Focusing the Familiar: A Translation and Philosophical Interpretation of the Zhongyong (2001)
- A Philosophical Translation of the Daodejing: Making This Life Significant (2003)

=== With Henry Rosemont Jr. ===
- The Confucian Analects: A Philosophical Translation (1998)
- The Chinese Classic of Family Reverence: A Philosophical Translation of the Xiaojing (2008)
- Confucian Role Ethics: A Moral Vision for the 21st Century? (2016)

=== Edited ===
- Wandering at Ease in the Zhuangzi (1998)
- The Aesthetic Turn: Reading Eliot Deutsch on Comparative Philosophy (1999)

=== Co-edited ===
- Emotions in Asian Thought: A Dialogue in Comparative Philosophy, With a Discussion by Robert C. Solomon (1994) With Joel Marks
- Self as Person in Asian Theory and Practice (1994) With Thomas P. Kasulis and Wimal Dissanayake
- Self and Deception: A Cross-Cultural Philosophical Enquiry (1996) With Wimal Dissanayake
- Self as Image in Asian Theory and Practice (1998) With Thomas P. Kasulis and Wimal Dissanayake
- Confucian Cultures of Authority (2006) With Peter D. Hershock
- Xu Bing and Contemporary Chinese Art: Cultural and Philosophical Reflections (2011) With Hsingyuan Tsao
- Value and Values: Economics and Justice in an Age of Global Interdependence (2015) With Peter D. Hershock
- Zhuangzi and the Happy Fish (2015) With Takahiro Nakajima
- Confucianisms for a Changing World Cultural Order (2017) With Peter D. Hershock
- Li Zehou and Confucian Philosophy (2018) With Jinhua Jia
- Having a Word with Angus Graham: At Twenty-Five Years into His Immortality (2018) with Carine DeFoort

=== Book chapters ===
- "Putting Te back into Taoism" in Nature in Asian Traditions of Thought (1989) ed. J. Baird Callicott and Roger T. Ames
- "Understanding Order: The Chinese Perspective" in From Africa to Zen: An Invitation to World Philosophy (2003) ed. Robert C. Solomon and Kathleen Higgins
- "The Local and the Focal in Realizing a Daoist World" in Daoism and Ecology: Ways within a Cosmic Landscape (2001) ed. N.J. Girardot, James Miller and Liu Xiaogan

== References and further reading ==
- Jim Behuniak, ed. (2018). Appreciating the Chinese Difference: Engaging Roger T. Ames on Methods, Issues, and Roles. Albany: SUNY Press. ISBN 9781438470993. OCLC 1035214956.
- Ivanhoe, P. J. (April 1991). ["Review of Thinking Through Confucius, by D. L. Hall & R. T. Ames"]. Philosophy East and West. 41.2. 241–254. doi:10.2307/1399773. JSTOR 1399773.
- Kupperman, Joel J. (June 1989). "Review of Thinking Through Confucius". Harvard Journal of Asiatic Studies. 49.1. 251–59. doi:10.2307/2719305. JSTOR 2719305.
- Ian M. Sullivan, Joshua Mason, eds. (2021). One Corner of the Square: Essays on the Philosophy of Roger T. Ames. Honolulu: University of Hawaii Press. ISBN 9780824884628. OCLC 1181835301.
