= O. A. Bushnell =

American novelist

Oswald Andrew "Ozzy" Bushnell (11 May 1913 – 21 August 2002) was an American Hawaiian microbiologist, historian, novelist, and educator. He was a professor at the John A. Burns School of Medicine at the University of Hawaiʻi at Mānoa.

== Biography ==
Descended from contract laborers from Portugal and Norway and a mechanic from Italy, he was born in the working-class neighborhood of Kakaʻako in Honolulu. His friends and classmates in the area were Chinese, Japanese, Portuguese, Hawaiian, and "hapa-haole" [part-white], so he grew up "local," mastering Hawaiian "pidgin" as well as English as his novels attest. As a youngster he developed a love for the cultures of Hawaiʻi as well as literature and classical music.

He graduated in 1930 from the College of Saint Louis (high school) on River Street. He graduated in 1934 from the University of Hawaiʻi at Mānoa, where he served as student body president. By 1937 he had earned both his MS and PhD degrees in bacteriology from the University of Wisconsin–Madison and later worked and taught (1937–40) at George Washington University Medical School in Washington D.C. He returned to Hawaiʻi in 1940 working for the Department of Health on Kauaʻi and Maui. He joined the U.S. Army as a 2nd lieutenant in April 1942 after the attack on Pearl Harbor and became a quartermaster. He was stationed at Schofield Barracks for four years. As the war ended in 1945, he served in Okinawa and Japan as a medical corps officer and achieved the rank of major.

Following the war he taught at the University of Hawaiʻi at Mānoa, retiring in 1970 as emeritus professor of medical microbiology and medical history. He served as editor in chief of the journal Pacific Science from 1957 through 1967. Married to Elizabeth Jane Krauskopf in 1943, they had two sons, Andrew and Philip and a daughter, Mahealani.

Bushnell's first novel, The Return of Lono, won the Atlantic Monthly's fiction award in 1956, at a time when most books about Hawaiʻi were written by outsiders. Later novels dealt with other aspects of Hawaiʻi's history and he encouraged and inspired many other local writers to tell their own stories. Molokaʻi (1975) tells the story of leprosy patients quarantined at Kalaupapa; Kaʻaʻawa (1972) describes life on Oʻahu in the 1850s, during the great smallpox epidemic when many native Hawaiians were dying of newly introduced diseases; and Stone of Kannon (1979) and its sequel Water of Kane tell about the first Japanese contract laborers who arrived in 1868. In 1974, the Hawaiʻi Literary Arts Council presented him an Award for Literature, saying he "brought life to fact and reality to fiction."

His historical works include "Hawaii: A Pictorial History" (1969) with Joseph Feher and Edward Joesting, "A Walk Through Old Honolulu" (1975), and "A Song of Pilgrimage and Exile: The Life and Spirit of Mother Marianne of Molokai" (1980) with Sister Mary Laurence Hanley, O.S.F.

His last work, Gifts of Civilization: Germs and Genocide in Hawaii (1993), combined his interests in microbiology, Hawaiian history, and literature. It remains the definitive study of how Native Hawaiians, having lived in isolation for centuries, were very nearly wiped out by exposure to newly introduced diseases such as tuberculosis, smallpox, and leprosy.
