= Letters from Hawaii =

Book by Mark Twain

Mark Twain's Letters from Hawaii
- Cover of the 1966 edition
- Editor: A. Grove Day
- Author: Mark Twain
- Publisher: Appleton-Century
- Publication date: 1966
- A collection of letters originally written in 1866.

Letters from Hawaii is a collection of 25 letters that Mark Twain wrote in 1866 from the Hawaiian Islands as a special correspondent for The Sacramento Union. The letters, written early in Twain's career, were not published as a book until 1937, nearly three decades after his death. They have been collected under several titles, most recently Mark Twain's Letters from Hawaii.

Twain used his experiences in the Hawaiian Islands and the letters themselves as the basis for some of his early lectures, as well as the foundation for portions of Roughing It (1872).

== Summary ==
During his four-month and a day stay in the Hawaiian Islands, then called the Sandwich Islands, Twain visited the islands of Oahu, Maui, and Hawaii.

=== Oahu ===
Mark Twain arrives in Oahu under the reign of Kamehameha V and wrote Letters 1-17. He climbed Diamond Head, visited the newly formed Kingdom of Hawaii legislature, etc.

=== Maui ===
Mark Twain visited Haleakala, Maui, but left no letter on his itinerary of his Maui visit, except some statistics of sugar production in Maui (Letter 23).

=== Hawaii ===
In Letters 18 to 25, Mark Twain writes about his visits to Kailua Kona, Kealakekua Bay, and Kilauea.

== Publication History ==
The letters were first collected in book form, albeit with some omissions, in 1937 by Grabhorn Press, in a limited edition, under the title Letters from the Sandwich Islands. The first trade edition was published the following year by the Stanford University Press. In 1939, Thomas Nickerson published a limited edition titled Letters from the Honolulu. The first complete collection of the letters came in 1947, in an appendix to Walter F. Frear's Mark Twain and Hawaii, published by the Lakeside Press.

In 1966, 100 years after their original publication, Appleton-Century published the complete letters as Mark Twain's Letters from Hawaii, edited and with an introduction by A. Grove Day.
