= Chinese Studies International =

- Discipline: Chinese studies
- Language: English

Publication details
- Former name: China Review International
- History: 1994–present
- Publisher: University of Hawaiʻi Press (United States)
- Frequency: Annual

Standard abbreviations
- ISO 4: Chin. Stud. Int.

Indexing
- ISSN: 1069-5834 (print); 2996-8593 (web)

Links
- Journal homepage

Chinese Studies International formerly China Review International, is a journal that presents English-language reviews of innovative and relevant Chinese studies related books from within and outside of China. The journal was established in 1994 by Roger T. Ames (University of Hawaiʻi). The journal is published by the University of Hawaiʻi Press. Its first electronic edition appeared in 2000 on Project MUSE. In 2024, editor Ming-Bao Yue announced the change in title and that the journal would publish online continuously throughout the year.
