= Xing Ruan =

Chinese-Australian academic, architect (born 1965)

- Born: Kunming, China
- Occupation: Author, architect
- Subject: Architecture, Philosophy

Website
- professorxingruan.com

Professor Xing Ruan 阮昕 is a Chinese-Australian academic, architect and author. After more than two decades of work as a professor and architect in Australia, he returned to China to oversee the newly founded School of Design at Shanghai Jiao Tong University as dean and Guangqi Chair Professor of Architecture in 2018. During his tenure, he designed the school's campus. He is an advocate for new architecture and urban design in communion with the Chinese tradition.

== Early life and educationA ==
Born in Kunming, China, Ruan received a Bachelor of Architecture and Master of Architecture at Southeast University, Nanjing (1982 – 1989), and received a PhD at Victoria University of Wellington (1991 – 1996).

== Academic career ==
Ruan started his academic teaching career in 1995, at Curtin University, Western Australia. He held positions as a Lecturer, Senior Lecturer, and associate professor of Architecture until 2001. In 2002, Ruan joined the University of Technology Sydney (UTS) as Head of the School of Architecture. In 2004 he became Professor of Architecture at the University of New South Wales (UNSW). Ruan held a number of roles while at UNSW, including Chair of Architecture Discipline and Director of Master of Architecture (2005 – 2009), Director of Architecture (2014 – 2016), and Associate Dean at the Faculty of the Built Environment (2015 – 2018).

He has been Dean and Guangqi Chair Professor of Architecture at School of Design, Shanghai Jiao Tong University since July 2018.

== Design and Curatorial Practice ==
Xing Ruan runs a research-orientated design practice, encompassing architecture, landscape architecture, urban design and exhibition design. His latest built works include the aforementioned Shanghai Jiao Tong School of Design Building and the Beikun Garden. The latter was recognized with the World Landscape Architecture's Outstanding Award, and the former included in the Prix Versailles' list of most beautiful campuses, both in 2025.

He was the Curator of the 18th International Architecture Exhibition of La Biennale di Venezia – China Pavilion; and Architectural Curator of the 2019 Shanghai Urban Space Art Season Biennale.

== Publishing career ==
Ruan has written and published seven books, with focus spanning from research on China's to expositions on approaches to design thought and education.

He is co-editor, with Ronald Knapp, of the book series Spatial Habitus: Making and Meaning in Asia’s Architecture, published by the University of Hawai’i Press. Subjects of the series included China, Japan, Korea, India, and the Middle East.

In November 2021, Bloomsbury published Confucius’ Courtyard: Architecture, Philosophy, and the Good Life in China, distributed in the US, UK, Australia and New Zealand.

In 2022 he published an essay in the Shanghai Review of Books on the work of writer and geographer Yi-Fu Tuan.

Ruan has published essays and criticism on architecture and society for academic journals and mainstream media, including the Journal of the Society of Architectural Historians (JSAH), The Conversation, Quartz, Architecture Australia and Architecture Now.

In China, his essays have been published in Jianzhu Xuebao [Architectural Journal 建筑学报], (including his 2025 essay on the design of the Beikun Garden Wall), Jianzhu Shi [The Architect 建筑师] and Wenhui Xueren of Wenhui Ribao [Wenhui Scholar of Wenhui Daily 文汇学人， 文汇日报]. His 2025 essay on "'All-round' Design" in Architectural Journal proposed seeing design as a central field for human creativity and organization at a time in which many technical specialties are seen as replaceable by AI.

He has been interviewed about his work by ABC Radio National, Times Radio, Barron's Magazine and ArchDaily (most recently in a 2026 interview "'Architecture Is Not Jewelry': Xing Ruan on Building for Time, Not Perfection."

== Public lectures and events ==
Xing Ruan has given keynote and public lectures at many international conferences and universities including in China, Singapore, the UK, Italy, and New Zealand, as well as for the Royal Institute of British Architects (RIBA).

== Bibliography ==
- Confucius’ Courtyard: Architecture, Philosophy, and the Good Life in China – Bloomsbury, 2021
- Fusheng Jianzhu [Floating Life and Architecture 浮生·建筑] – The Commercial Press, 2020
- Hand & Mind: Conversations on Architecture and the Built World (editor) – The University of New South Wales Press, 2019
- Spatial Habitus: Making and Meaning in Asia’s Architecture (series) – The University of Hawai‘i Press, 2007
- Allegorical Architecture: Living Myth and Architectonics in Southern China – The University of Hawai‘i Press, 2006
- Skyplane (co-editor) – University of New South Wales Press, 2009
- Topophilia and Topophobia: Reflections on Twentieth-century Human Habitat – Routledge, 2007
- New China Architecture – Periplus/Tuttle, 2006
