= David Sanjek =

American professor of popular music

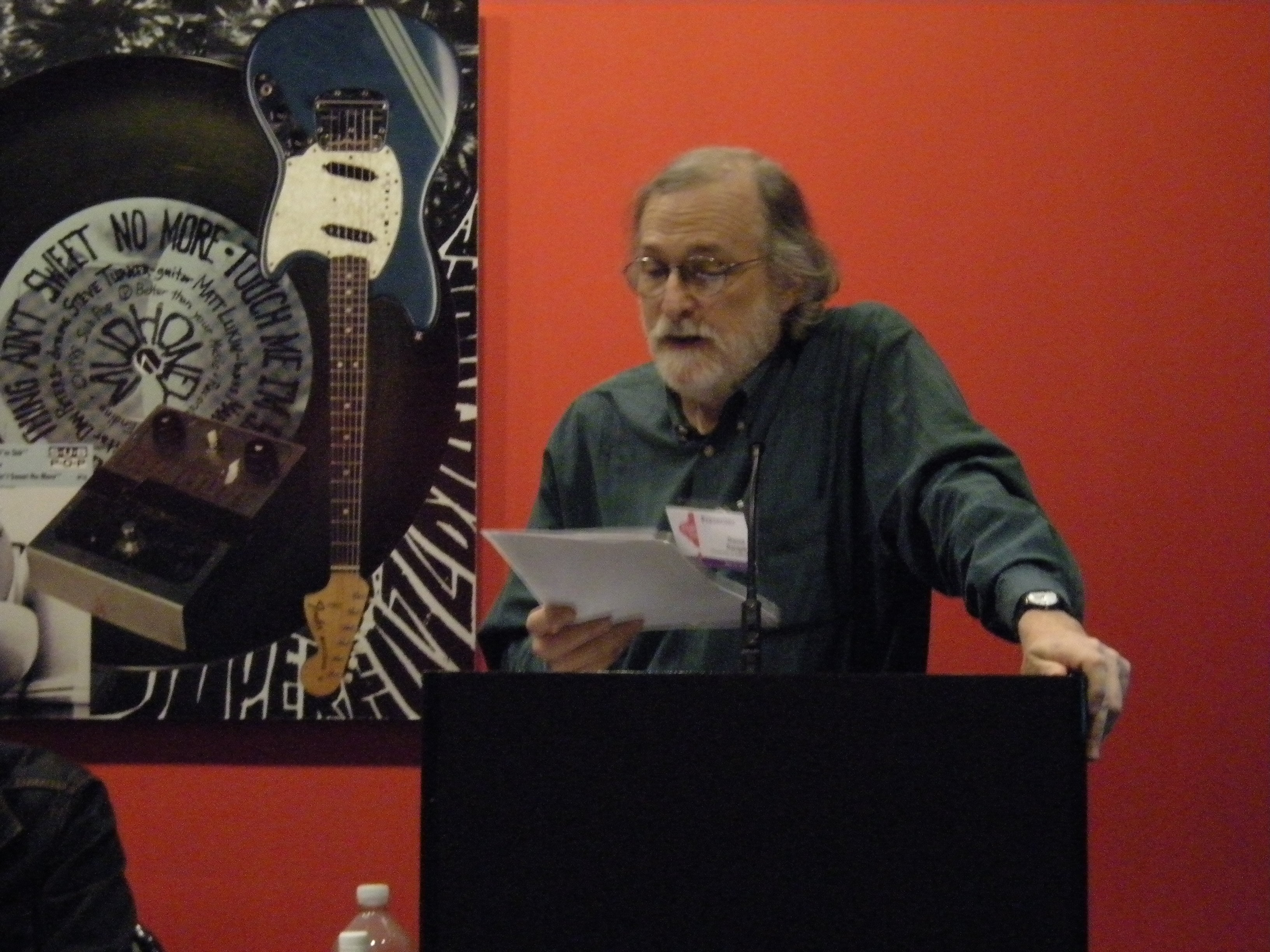
- Sanjek in 2008
- Born: September 3, 1952; New York City
- Died: November 29, 2011; New York (aged 59)
- Relatives: Roger Sanjek (brother)

Academic background
- Education: Connecticut College (BA); Washington University in St. Louis (MA, PhD)

Academic work
- Institutions: University of Salford; New York University; Hunter College; Fordham University; New School for Social Research
- Main interests: Literature, Music, Film
- Notable works: The American Popular Music Business in the Twentieth Century

David Sanjek (3 September 1952 – 29 November 2011) was a Professor of Popular Music and Director of the University of Salford Music Research Centre in Salford, Greater Manchester, England. Alongside his father, Russell Sanjek, they produced the first comprehensive written history of the American music industry; American Popular Music and Its Business: The First Four Hundred Years.

Sanjek was a scholar who published widely on Popular Music, Film, Media Studies, Copyright Law and Popular Culture. He was Director of the Archives at Broadcast Music, Inc. (BMI) between 1991 and 2007 and was considered to be a world expert in this field. He also served as an advisor to many organisations, including The Library of Congress, The Rock and Roll Hall of Fame, The Rhythm & Blues Foundation, The Blues Foundation, The Center for Black Music Research, The Experience Music Project Museum, The National Endowment for the Humanities and on several committees for the National Academy of Recording Arts and Sciences (NARAS). He was also the President, Vice-President and Secretary of the U.S. Branch of the International Association for the Study of Popular Music.

== Early life and career ==
David Sanjek was the son of noted jazz collector, music industry historian and long-time executive at BMI Russell Sanjek. He received his B.A. in English and Philosophy from Connecticut College and his M.A. and Ph.D. in Literature from Washington University in St Louis. He spent his pre-academic years as an influential and popular youth leader at the Farm & Wilderness summer camps and associated educational programs situated in and around Plymouth, Vermont. Sanjek is of Croatian descent.

== American Popular Music and Its Business: The First Four Hundred Years ==
This colossal work of research and writing traces the history of the American Music Business from its origins in Elizabethan England to the end of the twentieth century. David Sanjek was responsible for updating and refining the work in the third volume "Pennies From Heaven," which focusses on the technological and legal transformations that affected American Music industry between 1909 and 1984.

== Legacy ==
The David Sanjek Archive of numerous books, journals, papers, records and assorted audio and visual media artefacts is (at the time of writing) in preparation at University of Salford. It is expected to prove to be a valuable resource for the current and future scholars in the fields of popular music, film, literature and theatre.

The David Sanjek Memorial Graduate Student Paper Prize is offered by IASPM-US.

David is survived by his brothers Rick, a Nashville-based music entrepreneur and Roger Sanjek, an anthropologist and Professor.

== Music Publications ==
=== Books ===
- Sanjek, R. and Sanjek, D. (1996) Pennies from Heaven: The American Popular Music Business in the Twentieth Century. New York: Da Capo Press.
- Sanjek, R. and Sanjek, D. (1991) The American Popular Music Business in the 20th Century. New York: Oxford University Press.
- Sanjek, D. (2019) Stories We Could Tell: Putting Words to American Popular Music. Abingdom: Routledge.

=== Chapters ===
- Sanjek, D. with Halligan, B. (2013) You Can't Always Get What You Want: Riding on the Medicine Ball Caravan in The Music Documentary. London: Routledge.
- Sanjek, D. (2013) Zappa and the Freaks: Recording Wild Man Fisher in Paul Carr, ed., Frank Zappa and the And: Key Essays on the Contextualization of his Legacy. Aldershot: Ashgate.
- Sanjek, D. (2012) Groove Me: Listening to the Discs of Northern Soul in Transatlantic Routes of American Roots Music. Farnham: Ashgate.
- Sanjek, D. (2012) Putting It Together: The Institutionalization of the American Musical Theatre in Oxford Handbook of the American Musical Theatre. New York: Oxford University Press.
- Sanjek, D. (2012) Jimmy Bowen in Grove Dictionary of American Music. New York: Oxford University Press.... [and various other entries: Johnny Otis; the Orioles; Gene Vincent; Sister Rosetta Tharpe; Clyde McPhatter; Harold Melvin and the Blue Notes; Neville Brothers; Tracy Nelson; Doo Wop; Eddie Fisher; Ink Spots; Brenda Lee; Tony Brown; Allen Toussaint; Jim Denny; the Dells]
- Sanjek, D. (2011) African-American Music and the Recording Industry: An Introduction in Encyclopedia of African-American Music, Santa Barbara: Greenwood Press.
- Sanjek, D. (2011) African-American Music and the Recording Industry: 1919-1942 in: Encyclopedia of African-American Music,' Santa Barbara: Greenwood Press.
- Sanjek, D. (2011) African-American Music and the Recording Industry: 1942-68 in Encyclopedia of African-American Music. Santa Barbara: Greenwood Press.
- Sanjek, D. (2011) Jump Blues in Encyclopedia of African-American Music. Santa Barbara: Greenwood Press.
- Sanjek, D. (2011) What's Syd Got To Do With It?: King Records, Henry Glover and the Complex Achievement of Crossover in Hidden In The Mix: African American Country Music Traditions. Durham: Duke University Press.
- Sanjek, D. (2009) Bank Accounts and Black Narcissus: Jimmie Rodgers and the Professionalization of American Popular Music in Waiting For A Train: Jimmie Rodgers's America. Burlington, Mass.: Rounder Books, 65-81
- Sanjek, D. (2008) Shock Jocks: Making Mayhem Over the Radio in Battleground: The Media Volume 2 (O-Z). Upper Saddle River, New Jersey: Pearson/Prentice-Hall.
- Sanjek, D. (2005) I Give it a 94. It’s Got a Beat and You can Dance to It. Valuing Popular Music in Michael Berube, The Aesthetics of Cultural Studies: An Introduction. Oxford: Blackwell, p. 117-139.
- Sanjek, D. (2004) All the Memories Money Can Buy: Marketing Authenticity and Manufacturing Authorship in Eric Weisbard, ed., This is Pop, Harvard University Press, 155–172.
- Sanjek, D. (2004) In My Time of Dying: Johnny Cash, Johnny Paycheck, Gary Stewart and Cycles of Hipness Peper at American Studies Association Convention, November 13.
- Sanjek, D. (2002) Tell Me Something I Don’t Already Know in Norman Kelley, ed. Rhythm and Business: The Political Economy of Black Music. New York: Akashic Books.
- Sanjek, D. (1999) Institutions in T. Swiss and B. Horner, eds. Key Terms in Popular Music and Culture. Oxford: Blackwell, pp. 46–56
- Sanjek, D. (1998) Reeling in the Years: American Vernacular Music & Documentary Film, in Brophy, P. ed. Cinesonic: The World of Sound in Film. Sydney: AFTRS Publishing.
- Sanjek, D. (1998) Blue Moon of Kentucky Rising over the Mystery Train, in Cecilia Tichi, ed. Reading Country Music: Steel Guitars, Opra Stars and Honkytonk Bars. Duke University Press, p. 22-44
- Sanjek, D. (1998) Popular Music and the Synergy of Corporate Culture, in Thomas Swiss, J. Sloop and E. Herman, eds. Mapping the Beat: Popular Music and Contemporary Theory. Oxford: Blackwell,
- Sanjek, D. (1997) Can a Fujiama Mama be the Female Elvis? The Wild, Wild Women of Rockabilly in Whiteley, S. ed. Sexing the Groove. London: Routledge, pp. 137–167
- Sanjek, D. (1994) Don’t Have to DJ No More: Sampling and the Autonomous Creator in Martha Woodmansee and Peter Jansi, eds. The Construction of Authorship: Textual Appropriation in Law and Literature. Duke University Press.

=== Peer Reviewed Journals ===
- Sanjek, D. (2011) Hard of Hearing: Acoustic Legacies and Public Policies, Popular Music & Society.
- Sanjek, D. (2011) What Hath Phast Phreddie Wrought?: Los Angeles, Punk Music and the Recovery of Race Journal of Post-Punk.
- Sanjek, D. (2006) Ridiculing the White Bread Original: The Politics of Parody and Preservation of Greatness in Luther Campbell AKA Luke Skywalker et al. vs. Acuff-Rose Music, Inc.,' Cultural Studies 20, 2-3, pp. 262–281
- Sanjek, D. (2006) Ridiculing the White Bread Original: The Politics of Parody and Preservation of Greatness in Luther Campbell, AKA Luke Skyywalker et al vs. Acuff-Rose Music, Inc. Cultural Studies 20, 2-3, pp. 262–281.
- Sanjek, D. (2006) ‘Navigating the Channel: Recent Scholarship on African-American Popular Music,’ Journal of Popular Music Studies 11, 1, 167-192
- Sanjek, D. (1997) One Size Does Not Fit All: The Precarious Position of the African-American Entrepreneur in Post WW2 American Popular Music American Music 15, 4, 535-562
- Sanjek, D. (1992) Pleasure and Principles: Issues of Authenticity in the Analysis of Rock’n’Roll Journal of Popular Music Studies.

== Film Publications ==
=== Peer Reviewed Journals ===
- Sanjek, D. (2012) Review of Funny Pictures: Animation and Comedy in Studio-Era Hollywood. Daniel Goldmark and Charlie Keil, eds. Quarterly Review of Film and Video
- Sanjek, D. (2005) Getting Something Out [on Claude Chabrol] Pop Matters
- Sanjek, D. (2005) Thrills [on Harold Lloyd] Pop Matters
- Sanjek, D. (2004) Monkey King [on Jerry Lewis] Pop Matters
- Sanjek, D. (2003) The Doll and The Whip: Pathos and Ballyhoo in William Castle´s Homicidal Quarterly Review of Film and Video 20, 4, pp. 247–264
- Sanjek, D. (2003) A Brief Reign of Terror [on Gordon Hessler] Pop Matters
- Sanjek, D. (2002) Cold, Cold Heart: Joseph Losey’s The Damned and the Compensations of Genre Senses of Cinema 21
- Sanjek, D. (2002) Fate Wears a Fedora (on Jean Pierre Melville) Pop Matters
- Sanjek, D. (2002) Smile When You Say That: James Coburn (1908-2002) Pop Matters
- Sanjek, D. (2002) A Cynic’s Demise: Billy Wilder (1906-2002) Pop Matters
- Sanjek, D. (2001) Dario Argento's Blood on the Walls Bad Subjects
- Sanjek, D. (2001) Big Boss Man: Samuel J. Arkoff (1917-2001) Pop Matters
- Sanjek, D. (1996) Dr Hobbes Parasites: Victims, Victimization and Gender In David Cronenberg’s Shivers Cinema Journal 36, 1, 55-74.
- Sanjek, D. (1994) Torment Street Between Malicious and Crude: Sophisticated Primitivism in the Films of Samuel Fuller, Literature Film Quarterly 22, 3, pp. 187–194.
- Sanjek, D. (1994) Twilight of the Monsters: The English Horror Film 1968-1975 in Wheeler Winston Dixon, ed. Re-Viewing British Cinema 1900-1992. Albany: University of New York Press, p. 195-209.
- Sanjek, D. (1994) Foreign Detection: The West German Krimi and the Italian Giallo, Spectator 14, 2, 82-95
- Sanjek, D. (1990) ‘Fans’ Notes: The Horror Film Magazine Literature / Film Quarterly 18, 3, p. 150-160
