= A. Grove Day =

American historian

- Born: 1904; Philadelphia
- Died: March 26, 1994 (aged 89–90); Hawaii
- Education: Stanford University
- Occupations: Author, teacher, and authority on the history of Hawaii
- Writing career
- Language: English
- Subject: English
- Notable works: Pacific Science: A Quarterly Devoted to the Biological and Physical Sciences of the Pacific Region

Arthur Grove Day (1904 in Philadelphia – March 26, 1994 in Hawaii) was a writer, teacher, and authority on the history of Hawaii. He was also the founding editor in chief of Pacific Science: A Quarterly Devoted to the Biological and Physical Sciences of the Pacific Region.

Day earned his bachelor's and graduate degrees from Stanford University, where he befriended John Steinbeck. He moved to Hawaii in 1944 and was a professor in the English department of the University of Hawaii at Manoa, where he taught a course in "Literature of the Pacific". He chaired the English department from 1948 to 1953. In 1979, he won the Hawaii Award for Literature.

== Books ==
Day was a scholar of the South Pacific and wrote or edited more than fifty books, including

- History Makers of Hawaii
- Hawaiian Reader
- Mark Twain’s Letters from Hawaii (1966)
- Best South Sea Stories
- Mad About Islands: Of a Vanished Pacific, a collection of biographical essays on famous writers who spent time in the Pacific, including Jack London, Herman Melville, and Robert Louis Stevenson
- Rascals in Paradise, co-written with James Michener
- The Story of Australia
