= Asian Perspectives =

Journal

- Discipline: Archaeology
- Language: English
- Edited by: Francis Allard, Bérénice Bellina-Pryce, and Julie S. Field

Publication details
- Former name(s): Bulletin of the Far-Eastern Prehistory Association (American Branch)
- History: 1957–present
- Publisher: University of Hawaii Press (United States)
- Frequency: Biannual

Standard abbreviations
- ISO 4: Asian Perspect.

Indexing
- ISSN: 0066-8435 (print); 1535-8283 (web)
- OCLC no.: 898817061

Links
- Journal homepage; Online access at Project MUSE; Online access at ScholarSpace

Asian Perspectives: The Journal of Archaeology for Asia and the Pacific is an academic journal covering the history and prehistory of Asia and the Pacific region. In addition to archaeology, it features articles and book reviews on ethnoarchaeology, palaeoanthropology, physical anthropology, and ethnography. The journal was established in 1957 as the Bulletin of the Far-Eastern Prehistory Association (American Branch) under the editorship of Wilhelm G. Solheim II, then followed its editor to other institutions. Volumes II (1958) through VIII (1964) were published by Hong Kong University Press, and volumes IX (1966) through XI (1968) by the Social Science Research Institute at the University of Hawaii. The University of Hawaii Press became the publisher from volume XII (1969), adding the subtitle A Journal of Archaeology and Prehistory of Asia and the Pacific. In 1992, the editorship passed to Michael W. Graves and the subtitle was changed to The Journal of Archaeology for Asia and the Pacific. Miriam Stark at the University of Hawaiʻi served as editor from 2000 through 2006, then the editorship passed to three-person team: Deborah Bekken (Field Museum), Laura Lee Junker (University of Illinois at Chicago), and Anne P. Underhill (Yale University). Currently, editor-in-chiefs are Francis Allard (Indiana University of Pennsylvania), Bérénice Bellina-Pryce (University of Paris-Nanterre), and Julie S. Field (Ohio State University).

The journal appears biannually in March and September. Its first electronic edition appeared in 2000 (vol. 39) on Project MUSE. Back issues are being added to an open-access archive in the University of Hawaii at Mānoa's ScholarSpace institutional repository.
