= Charles A. Moore =

American historian

Charles Alexander Moore (March 11, 1901 – April 1967) was an American philosopher, historian, sinologist, and writer. He was a professor of comparative philosophy at the University of Hawaiʻi.

== Biography ==
He was born in Chicago, Illinois on March 11, 1901. Moore was educated at Yale University, where he received an A.B. in 1926 and a Ph.D. in 1932, then taught philosophy for three years. In 1936 he began his 30-year career at the University of Hawaiʻi, where he founded the East-West Philosophers' Conferences, directing the first four in 1939, 1949, 1959, and 1964. In 1951 he also founded a journal, Philosophy East and West, and served as its editor until his death.

In 1947 he received fellowships from the Guggenheim Foundation and the Watumull Foundation to do a year of postdoctoral work at Banaras Hindu University. He chaired the section on philosophy and religion at the UNESCO Conference in 1957, chaired the plenary session of the International Congress of Philosophy in Mexico City in 1963, and taught at various times as a visiting professor at Boston University, Cornell University, Duke University, and the University of Southern California. In 1967 Visva-Bharati University awarded him a D.Litt., and in 1969 the University of Hawaiʻi named a new building Moore Hall.

In 1957, Moore co-edited a book on Indian philosophy (along with Sarvepalli Radhakrishnan) entitled A Source Book In Indian Philosophy. It was published by the Princeton University Press.

He died in 1967 in Honolulu, Hawaii.

== See also ==
- American philosophy
- List of American philosophers
