= Artifact (archaeology) =

Objects used by humans

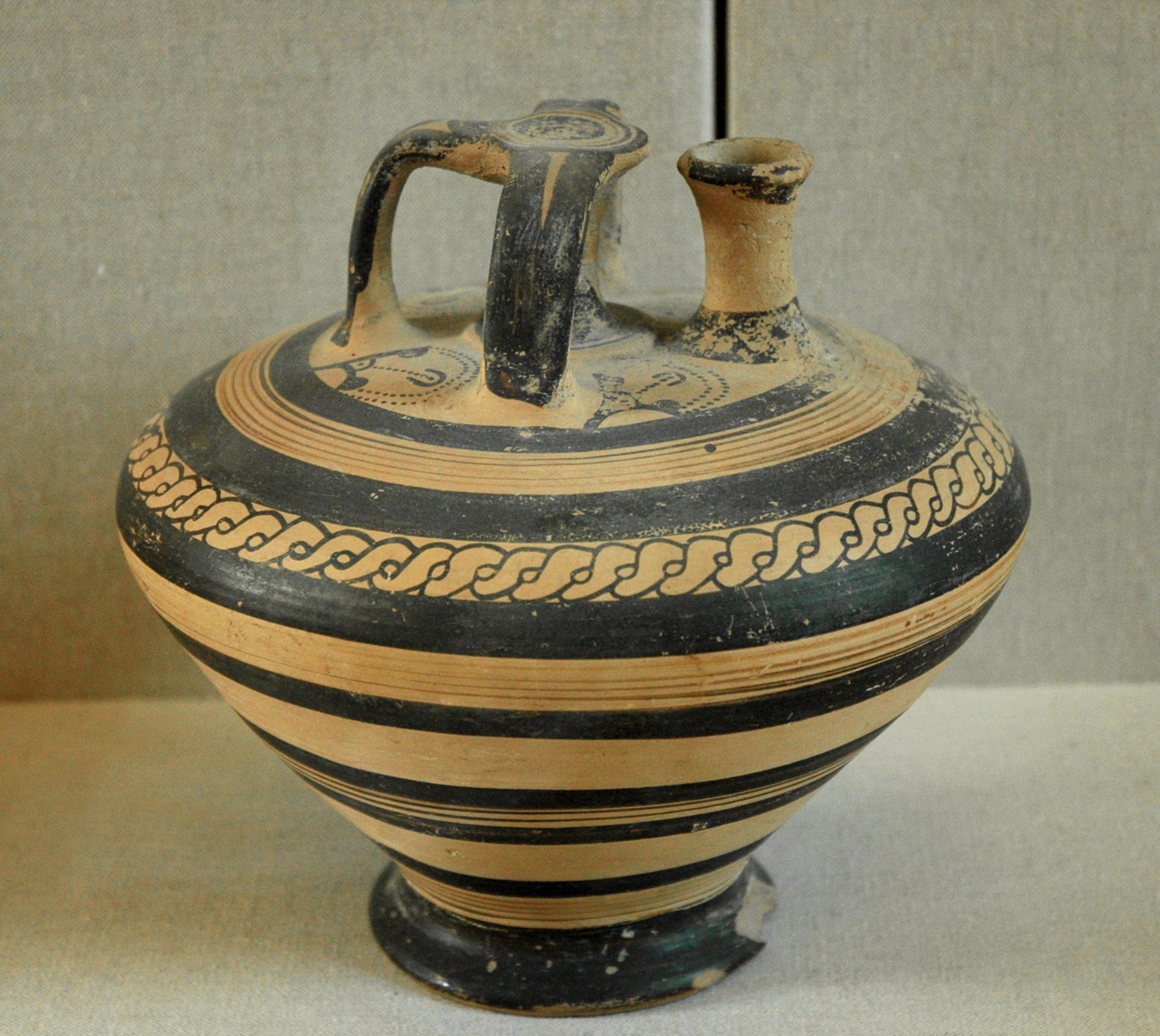
Mycenaean stirrup jar from Ras Shamra (Ugarit) Syria, 1400–1300 BC

An artifact (Note: From Latin phrase arte factum~ars facere to make) or artefact (British English) is a general term for an item made or given shape by humans, such as a tool or a work of art, especially an object of archaeological interest. In archaeology, the word has become a term of particular nuance; it is defined as an object recovered by archaeological endeavor, including cultural artifacts (of cultural interest).

"Artefact" is the general term used in archaeology, while in museums the equivalent general term is normally "object", and in art history perhaps artwork or a more specific term such as "carving". The same item may be called all or any of these in different contexts, and more specific terms will be used when talking about individual objects, or groups of similar ones.

Artefacts exist in many different forms and can sometimes be confused with ecofacts and features; all three of these can sometimes be found together at archaeological sites. They can also exist in different types of context depending on the processes that have acted on them over time. A wide variety of analyses take place to analyze artefacts and provide information on them. However, the process of analyzing artefacts through scientific archaeology can be hindered by the looting and collecting of artefacts, which sparks ethical debate.

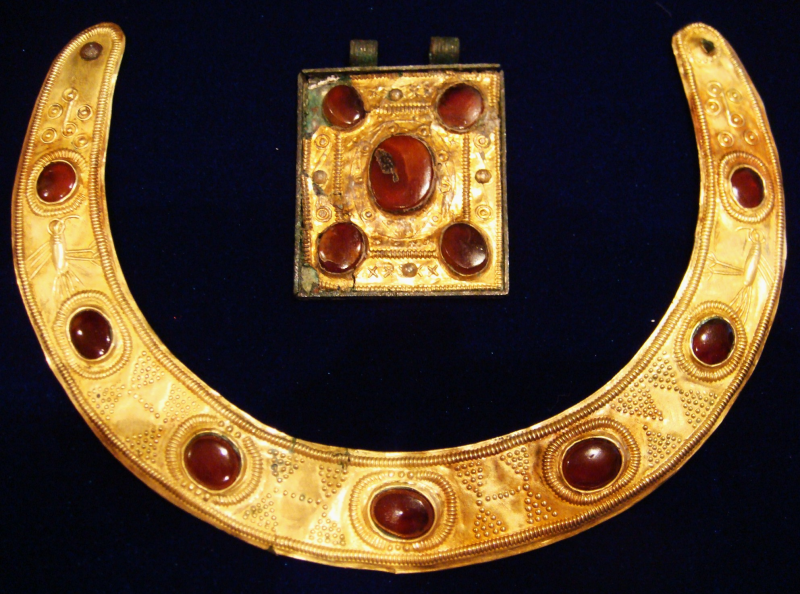
A 2nd century AD Sarmatian-Parthian gold necklace and amulet from the Black Sea region.

== History ==
From the emergence of the Hominids in the Stone Age, humanity has developed a handful of artifacts through time and place. There are archaeological sites and museums that obtain artifacts for physical evidence through past traces of civilizations, as well as norms and rituals, where objects attested a part of material culture.

== Context ==
Artifacts can come from any archaeological context or source such as:

- Buried along with a body
- From any feature such as a midden or other domestic setting
- Votive offerings
- Hoards, such as in wells

Examples include stone tools, pottery vessels, metal objects such as weapons and items of personal adornment such as buttons, jewelry and clothing. Bones that show signs of human modification are also examples. Natural objects, such as fire cracked rocks from a hearth or plant material used for food, are classified by archaeologists as ecofacts rather than as artifacts.

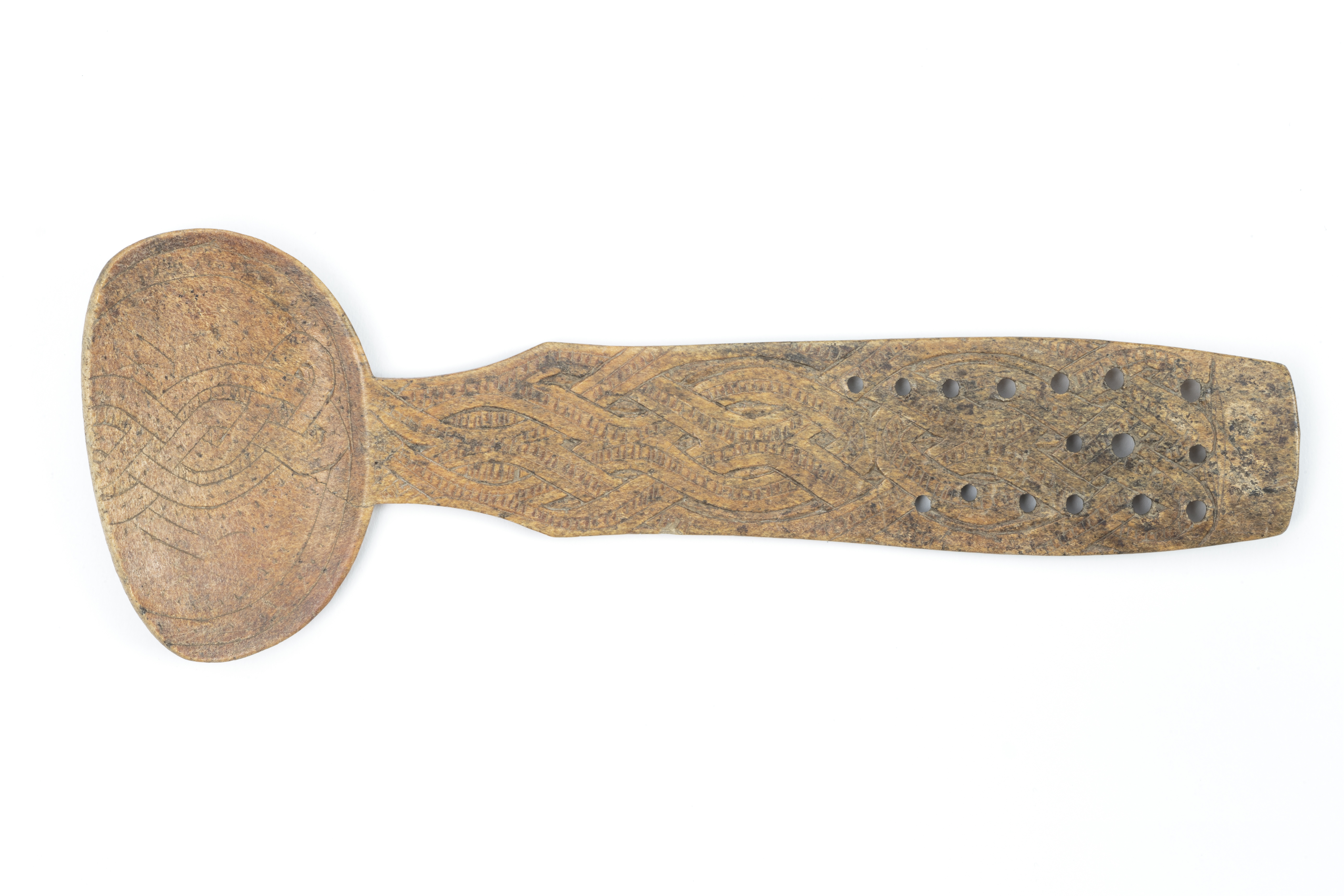
A Crusading Period spoon from 1017 that was found on archaeological excavation of Tursiannotko in Pirkkala, Finland.

Artifacts exist as a result of behavioural and transformational processes. A behavioural process involves acquiring raw materials, manufacturing these for a specific purpose and then discarding after use. Transformational processes begin at the end of behavioural processes; this is when the artifact is changed by nature and/or humans after it has been deposited. Both of these processes are significant factors in evaluating the context of an artifact.

The context of an artifact can be broken into two categories: primary context and secondary context. A matrix is a physical setting within which an artifact exists, and a provenience refers to a specific location within a matrix. When an artifact is found in the realm of primary context, the matrix and provenience have not been changed by transformational processes. However, the matrix and provenience are changed by transformational processes when referring to secondary context. Artifacts exist in both contexts, and this is taken into account during the analysis of them. Another important type of context for archaeologists, particularly from an art history perspective, is the term provenance, or the more general history of an artifact's ownership, location, and importance.

Artifacts are distinguished from stratigraphic features and ecofacts. Stratigraphic features are non-portable remains of human activity that include hearths, roads, deposits, trenches and similar remains. Ecofacts, also referred to as biofacts, are objects of archaeological interest made by other organisms, such as seeds or animal bone.

Natural objects that humans have moved but not changed are called manuports. Examples include seashells moved inland or rounded pebbles placed away from the water action that made them.

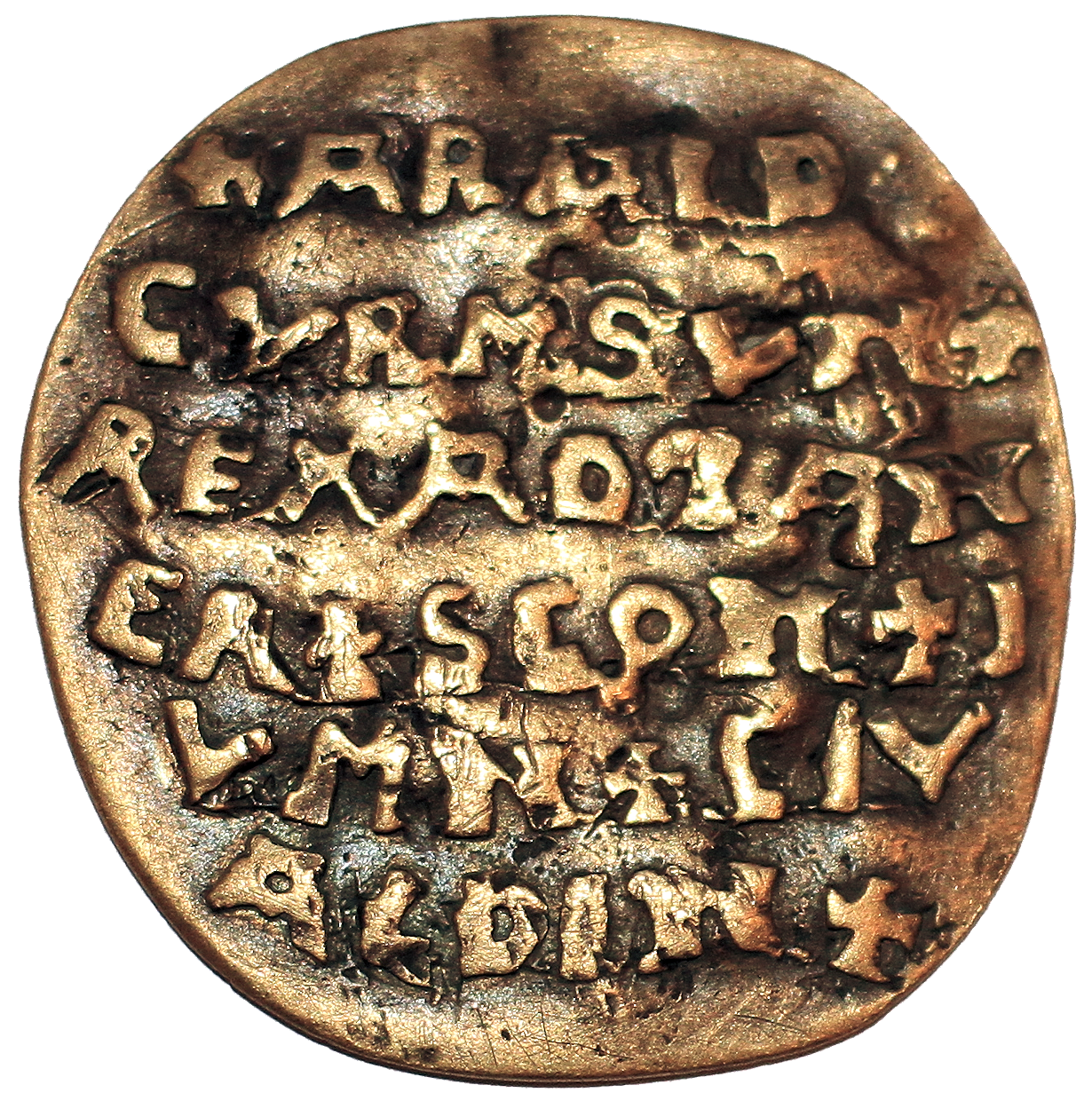
Curmsun Disc - Obverse, Jomsborg, 980s, Burial site of king Harald Bluetooth

These distinctions are often blurred; a bone removed from an animal carcass is a biofact but a bone carved into a useful implement is an artifact. Similarly there can be debate over early stone objects that could be either crude artifact or naturally occurring and happen to resemble early objects made by early humans or Homo sapiens. It can be difficult to distinguish the differences between actual human-made lithic artifact and geofacts – naturally occurring lithics that resemble human-made tools. It is possible to authenticate artifacts by examining the general characteristics attributed to human-made tools and local characteristics of the site.

Artifacts, features and ecofacts can all be located together at sites. Sites may include different arrangements of the three; some might include all of them while others might only include one or two. Sites can have clear boundaries in the form of walls and moats, but this is not always the case. Sites can be distinguished through categories, such as location and past functions. How artifacts exist at these sites can provide archaeological insight. An example of this would be utilizing the position and depth of buried artifacts to determine a chronological timeline for past occurrences at the site.

Modern archaeologists take care to distinguish material culture from ethnicity, which is often more complex, as expressed by Carol Kramer in the dictum "pots are not people."

== Analysis ==
Artifact analysis is determined by what type of artifact is being examined, the best.

Lithic analysis refers to analysing artifacts that are created with stones and are often in the form of tools. Stone artifacts occur often throughout prehistoric times and are, therefore, a crucial aspect in answering archaeological questions about the past. On the surface, lithic artifacts can help archaeologists study how technology has developed throughout history by showing a variety of tools and manufacturing techniques from different periods of time. However, even deeper questions can be answered through this type of analysis; these questions can revolve around topics that include how societies were organized and structured in terms of socialization and the distribution of goods. The following lab techniques all contribute to the process of lithic analysis: petrographic analysis, neutron activation, x-ray fluorescence, particle-induced x-ray emission, individual flake analysis and mass analysis.

Another type of artifact analysis is ceramic analysis, which is based around the archaeological study of pottery. This type of analysis can help archaeologists gain information on the raw materials that were used and how they were utilized in the creation of pottery. Laboratory techniques that allow for this are mainly based around spectroscopy. The different types of spectroscopy used include atomic absorption, electrothermal atomic absorption, inductively coupled plasma-atomic emission and x-ray fluorescence. Ceramic analysis does more than just provide information on raw materials and pottery production; it helps provide insight to past societies in terms of their technology, economy and social structure.

Additionally, faunal analysis exists to study artifacts in the form of animal remains. Just as with lithic artifacts, faunal remains are extremely common within the field of archaeology. Faunal analysis provides insight to trade due to animals being exchanged in different markets over time and being traded over long distances. Faunal remains can also provide information on social status, ethnic distinctions and dieting from previous complex societies.

Dating artifacts and providing them with a chronological timeline is a crucial part of artifact analysis. The different types of analyses above can all assist in the process of artifact dating. The major types of dating include relative dating, historical dating and typology. Relative dating occurs when artifacts are placed in a specific order in relation to one another while historical dating occurs for periods of written evidence; relative dating was the only form of dating for prehistoric periods of time. Typology is the process that groups together artifacts that are similar in material and shape. This strategy is based around the ideas that styles of objects match certain time periods and that these styles change slowly over time.

== Ethics ==
Artifact collecting and looting has sparked heavy debate in the archaeological realm. Looting in archaeological terms is when artifacts are dug up from sites and collected in private or sold before they are able to be excavated and analysed through formal scientific archaeology. The debate is centered around the difference in beliefs between collectors and archaeologists. Archaeologists are focused on excavation, context and lab work when it comes to artifacts, while collectors are motivated by varying personal desires. This brings many to ask themselves the archaeological question, "Who owns the past?"

There are also ethical issues over the display of artifacts in museums which have been taken from other countries in questionable circumstances, for example the display of the Parthenon (Elgin) Marbles by the British Museum. The display of objects belonging to indigenous peoples of non-European countries by European museums – particularly those taken during the European conquest of Africa – has also raised ethical questions. Pan-African activists such as Mwazulu Diyabanza and the Front Multi Culturel Anti-Spoliation (Multicultural Front Against Pillaging) have taken direct action against European museums, aiming to restitute items they believe to belong to Africa.

== See also ==
- Antiquities
- Biofact (archaeology)
- Chronological dating
- Excavation
- Out-of-place artifact
- Seriation
- Small finds
