= Pacific Science =

- Discipline: Natural sciences
- Language: English
- Edited by: David Duffy

Publication details
- History: 1947-present
- Publisher: University of Hawaiʻi Press (United States)
- Impact factor: 0.861 (2019)

Standard abbreviations
- ISO 4: Pac. Sci.

Indexing
- ISSN: 0030-8870 (print); 1534-6188 (web)
- LCCN: 51015581
- OCLC no.: 45666040

Links
- Journal homepage

Pacific Science is a quarterly multidisciplinary peer-reviewed scientific journal covering the biological and physical sciences of the Pacific basin, focusing especially on biogeography, ecology, evolution, geology and volcanology, oceanography, palaeontology, and systematics. It is published by the University of Hawaiʻi Press and was established in 1947. It is the official journal of the Pacific Science Association.

The founding editor-in-chief was A. Grove Day. Leonard D. Tuthill served as editor of vols. 2-7 (1948–1953); William A. Gosline edited vols. 8-10 (1954–1956) and vols. 22-25 (1968–1971); and O. A. Bushnell edited vols. 11-21 (1957–1967). The longest-serving editor was E. Alison Kay, who edited vols. 26-54 (1972–2000), stepping down only after she retired. Gerald D. Carr edited vols. 55-58 (2001–2004) and from vol. 59 (2005) was succeeded by Curtis C. Daehler. All editors have been faculty of the University of Hawaiʻi.

The journal's first electronic edition appeared in 2001 on Project MUSE, which continues to host archives of vols. 55 (2001) through 61 (2007). The most current electronic edition is available on BioOne, which also hosts archives going back to vol. 59 (2005).

Back issues of Pacific Science are archived online in the University of Hawaii at Mānoa's ScholarSpace institutional repository.
