= Association of Pacific Coast Geographers =

The Association of Pacific Coast Geographers (APCG) promotes scholarly research in geography and disseminates geographic information in the Pacific Coast region of North America.

== History ==
The organization was founded in 1935 at the University of California, Los Angeles and incorporated in 1962 at the University of Washington in Seattle. Since 1952, the APCG has also served as the Pacific Coast Regional Division of the Association of American Geographers, serving Alaska, Arizona, British Columbia, California, Hawaii, Idaho, Nevada, Oregon, Washington, and Yukon Territory. It is currently headquartered at California State University, Sacramento.

Donald W. Meinig and Otis Willard Freeman spoke at the APCG meeting in 1954. The 1967 meeting, at Chico State College, attracted about 300 attendees.

== Publications ==
The APCG produces a semiannual newsletter, Pacifica, and an annual journal, the Yearbook of the Association of Pacific Coast Geographers, published by the University of Hawaii Press.
