= Roger Sanjek =

Roger Sanjek is an American anthropologist. He is a former professor of anthropology at Queens College, City University of New York.

== Biography ==
Sanjek was born to Russell Sanjek, a longtime executive with Broadcast Music, Inc and a historian of the American music industry.

He received his B.A. and Ph.D. from Columbia University. He taught anthropology from 1972 to 2008 at Queens College. His fieldwork has taken him to Brazil, Ghana, and most recently, ethnically diverse immigrant neighborhoods in the United States such as Elmhurst, Queens and Corona, Queens, resulting in the book The Future of Us All (1998), which won the J. I. Staley Prize from the School for Advanced Research "to a living author for a book that exemplifies outstanding scholarship and writing in anthropology."

Sanjek received a Guggenheim Fellowship in 2003 in the "Anthropology and Cultural Studies" category.

His brother, David Sanjek, was a musicologist and professor of popular music at the University of Salford.
