= Pacific Science Association =

Asia-Pacific scientific organization

- Abbreviation: PSA
- Formation: 1920; 106 years ago
- Type: Non-profit
- Purpose: Advancing science, technology, and sustainable development in and of the Asia-Pacific region
- Headquarters: Honolulu, Hawaii, USA
- Region served: 42 countries (Asia-Pacific Rim and Basin countries and territories)
- Members: 28 nations
- President: Yonglong Lu
- Website: www.pacificscience.org

The Pacific Science Association (PSA) is a regional, non-governmental, scholarly organization that seeks to advance science and technology in support of sustainable development in the Pacific Rim. It was founded in 1920 and its secretariat is based at the Bishop Museum in Honolulu, United States.

== Activities ==
Through Congress and Inter-Congress meetings, and ongoing scientific Working Groups, PSA provides an interdisciplinary platform for scientists to discuss and review common concerns and priorities in the region. Through our scientific network, PSA links scientists from developed countries with those from developing countries, including the archipelagic and more remote states of the Pacific. PSA facilitates research initiatives on critical emerging issues for the region, such as biodiversity loss, climate change, infectious diseases, and the social implications of globalization, in which science can provide crucial information in a way that is required by both society and policymakers to make sound and informed decisions. PSA is a Scientific Associate of the International Council for Science (ICSU).

PSA's ongoing activities include:

Multi-symposia Pacific Science Congresses, held in a different location every four years. Somewhat smaller and more topically focused Inter-Congress meetings are also held in between each Congress. There have been 23 Congresses and 12 Inter-Congresses held since 1920, at venue ranging from Tokyo, Honolulu, Vancouver, Beijing, Kuala Lumpur, Tahiti, Fiji, Khabarovsk, and Valparaiso. The most recent 23rd Congress was held at the campus of Academia Sinica in Taipei, Taiwan in June 2016. The 24th Pacific Science Congress will be co-hosted by the China Association of Science and Technology held on the campus of Shantou University in Shantou, China from 28 June to 3 July 2021.

Pacific Science, the official journal of the PSA. Pacific Science is a quarterly journal devoted to the biological, physical, and social sciences of the Pacific Region.

== Membership ==
The Pacific Science Association is composed of national, individual, and NGO/corporate members. National members (i.e. 'adhering organizations') are typically represented by the National Academies of Science from each country, but some national members are universities located within countries which are also national members (for example, the University of the Ryukyus in Okinawa, Japan is a 'national member', although Japan itself is also a member). Individual and NGO/corporate memberships also form an important part of PSA's constituency.

The Pacific Science Council is the governing body of PSA, and is composed of one or several representatives from each Adhering Organization to PSA. Current national members to PSA include Australia, China-Beijing, China-Hong Kong, China-Taipei, France, Guam, Indonesia, Japan, Korea, Malaysia, Okinawa, Pacific Islands (Cook Islands, Fiji, Kiribati, Marshall Islands, Nauru, Niue, Samoa, Solomon Islands, Tokelau, Tonga, Tuvalu, Vanuatu), Russia, Singapore, Thailand, the United States, and Vietnam.

== Structure ==
The PSA structure consists of an executive board, Pacific Science Council, a secretariat, and national committees. PSA is composed of both national members, called adhering organizations, and individual members.

== Geographic scope ==
The geographic scope covered by PSA is "the Pacific" – broadly defined – and thus including all countries and islands within and bordering the Pacific Ocean as well as countries with strong research interest in the region. This definition thus includes many Asian and American countries as well, but specifically in the respect that some part of their territories exists in the Pacific region. Conversely, "the Pacific Islands" is used to refer to the small island states in Melanesia, Micronesia, and Polynesia.
