= Asian Theatre Journal =

- Discipline: performing arts
- Language: English
- Edited by: Man He

Publication details
- History: 1984–present
- Publisher: University of Hawaii Press (United States)
- Frequency: Biannual

Standard abbreviations
- ISO 4: Asian Theatre J.

Indexing
- ISSN: 0742-5457 (print); 1527-2109 (web)
- JSTOR: 07425457

Links
- Journal homepage

The Asian Theatre Journal is an academic journal dedicated to the performing arts of Asia, focusing upon both traditional and modern theatrical forms. It contains descriptive and analytical articles, original plays and play translations, as well as reviews of books and plays and reports of current theatrical activities in Asia.

== Background ==
The journal was established by James R. Brandon (University of Hawaii) in 1984 and serves as the official journal of the Association for Asian Performance, an affiliate of the Association for Theatre in Higher Education. It is published by the University of Hawaii Press. In 1992, the editorship passed to Samuel L. Leiter (Brooklyn College), who began the practice of included a translated play in each issue. Kathy Foley (University of California, Santa Cruz) served as editor from 2005 to 2018. Siyuan Liu (University of British Columbia) served as the editor until September 2025. Dr Man He is the current editor.

Asian Theatre Journal appears biannually in March and September. Its first electronic edition appeared in 2000 on Project MUSE. Back volumes up to three years behind the current volume are available in the JSTOR electronic archive.

== Abstracting and indexing ==
The journal is abstracted and indexed in:

- Scopus
- MLA - Modern Language Association Database
- International Bibliography of Theatre & Dance (IBTD)
