= Miriam Stark =

American archaeologist

- Born: September 14, 1962 (age 63)
- Education: Ph.D from University of Arizona (1993)
- Alma mater: University of Arizona University of Michigan
- Occupation: Professor of Anthropology
- Known for: Southeast Asian Archaeology Emphasis in Greater Angkor Region

Miriam T. Stark (born September 14, 1962) is an American archaeologist whose field experience and emphasis of studies have included locations in North America, the Near East and Southeast Asia. She is currently a professor of Southeast Asian Archaeology at the University of Hawai’i-Manoa, a position she has held since August 1995. Having first received her B.A. from the University of Michigan, she went on to complete her M.A and PhD from the University of Arizona. Stark has co-directed the Lower Mekong Archaeological Project (LOMAP), located in southern Cambodia for the past 12 years. Her research focus not only includes the various aspects of political economy, but also on the process of state formation.

From 2000 until 2006, Miriam T. Stark edited the Asian Perspectives and from 2007 until present, she has directed the Luce Asian Archaeology Program, with funding from the Henry Luce Foundation Initiative in East and Southeast Asian Archaeology. Prior to her current research in Cambodian archaeology, Stark conducted ethnoarchaeological research in the Philippines. Miriam Stark has also conducted fieldwork in various locations such as Israel, New Mexico, Turkey and Thailand.

Stark is a proponent of citizen science, or public support, for fieldwork and research conducted in various locales. She has been quoted as saying, "citizens become better stewards for our shared archaeological past by experiencing it directly. Archaeological fieldwork also requires many hands." She is a member of the Editorial Advisory Board of the archaeology journal Antiquity.

== Research ==
=== Cambodia ===
Beginning with her work co-directing the Lower Mekong Archaeological Project, in 1996, Stark has since conducted nine archaeological field seasons around Angkor Borei, between the years of 1996 and 2009. Her work actively blended research with student training, with over 50 students from various countries from Southeast Asia, including Cambodia, participating in the work. This work was centered on understanding why the Mekong Delta is critical to understanding Southeast Asian state formation. The Mekong Delta region was first noted in ancient Chinese accounts and may have been associated with the Funan kingdom. Stark stated that her goal in research conducted in this region was to "heighten public commitment to preserving the Cambodian archaeological heritage". Additionally, particularly in the Angkor Borei region, her goal was to better understand not only the impact of human beings on the landscape, but also political and economic organizations within the region.

Beginning in 2010, Miriam T. Stark joined the third phase of research investigating what was deemed the “demise of Angkor”. This research project was conducted by the University of Sydney and was labeled as the Greater Angkor Project. The study examined occupational patterning in the Greater Angkor region and focused on locations such as the Angkor Wat temple. In both 2010 and 2012, Stark worked as a GAP III co-investigator in the Greater Angkor region, testing habitations in an attempt to determine residence of Angkorian and Post-Angkorian societies. Locations studied and tested included but were not limited to Angkor Wat, Ta Prohm, Wat Athvea, and Wat Prei Einkosei. Prior to this research, very little work had been done in regards to the study of residence in these regions.

In 2013, more extensive work was done in the region with excavations conducted in and around Angkor Wat. This is of particular interest due to the utilization of LiDAR imaging to document the landscape.

=== Philippines ===
In 1987, Stark joined Bill Longacre's Kalinga Ethnoarchaeological Project, located in the Pasil municipality in the province of Kalinga, Philippines. There, she focused her study on the village of Dalupa, a moderately-sized village within Pasil with about 400 villagers. In Dalupa, the practice of pottery-making is a part-time specialization for its female inhabitants. Her work examined the uses, distribution, and production of the pottery across Kalinga as well as the social boundaries, household economies, and technological shifts in the lives of Kalinga's residents. This field-based research formed the basis of her doctoral dissertation work.

== Projects ==
=== Lower Mekong Archaeological Project (LOMAP) ===
The Cold War turmoil from 1965 to 1989 damaged Cambodia's archaeological sites suffered and nearly destroyed the country's archaeological community. Archaeological research and historic preservation activities halted for several decades. As the violence concluded, restoration slowly restarted with the help of UNESCO, the World Monuments Fund, and specialists from around the world. Demand for local expertise in Cambodian archaeology was high, so training local Cambodian archaeologists for future generations has been integral to preserving Cambodia's archaeological heritage.

The Lower Mekong Archaeological Project that Stark established with Chuch Phoeurn (Ministry of Culture and Fine Arts, Kingdom of Cambodia) was a direct outgrowth of the University of Hawaii/East-West Center/Royal University of Fine Arts Cambodia Project initiated in 1994 by Dr. Judy Ledgerwood (then of the East-West Center and Dr. P. Bion Griffin (Department of Anthropology, University of Hawaii). Funding for the project was initially provided by the East-West Center, and the Cambodia project was envisioned as the foundation for long-term research programs by faculty from the University of Hawaii’ that involve training graduates of the Royal University of Fine Arts (Phnom Penh) in archaeology, art history, cultural anthropology, and historic preservation. Training archaeology students has been a primary goal of the Royal University of Fine Arts (Phnom Penh) for more than a decade, since the temples of Angkor are the leading tourist attraction in Cambodia and the country lacks trained specialists to manage them. One of the many tragedies of the Khmer Rouge era was the disappearance of most of Cambodia’s archaeologists; it is said that only four trained archaeologists survived that era. They recognized the urgent need to train the next generation in archaeology to provide preservation specialists for the country’s archaeological heritage, and have actively sought international cooperating institutions to support this goal since the early 1990s.

=== Luce Asian Archaeology Program ===
Stark directs the Luce Asian Archaeology Program (LAAP) at the University of Hawai'i at Manoa, which was launched in July 2008. The project is funded by The Henry Luce Foundation's Luce Initiative on East and Southeast Asian Archaeology and Early History as well as other participating entities of the University of Hawaiʻi at Mānoa. These include the Department of Anthropology, Center for Southeast Asian Studies, Art & Art History, American Studies, History, Asian Studies, and Center for Chinese Studies.

The LAAP is primarily aimed toward helping archaeological professionals at the junior-level to develop the skills required for grant seeking and international collaborative research. The program has three specific objectives: to enhance the English skills of participating students, so it can lead to their international collaboration in the archaeological field; to provide archaeological training within the class setting to prepare students for a variety of subjects that enhance professional development; and to provide field experience after completing the academic training at the university through field training . A total of 12 East and Southeast Asian archaeologists participated in the LAAP from 2009-2012; many have continued their training in postgraduate archaeology programs internationally.

=== Greater Angkor Project III ===
From 2010 to 2014, Stark was involved with the Greater Angkor Project (GAP) Phase III, which was funded by the Discovery Project of the Australian Research Council. This project sought to investigate the habituation patterns of the Angkor civilization, which, as the capital of Khmer founded in the 9th century CE, was one of the world's biggest pre-industrial civilizations. The capital was abandoned around half a millennium ago; the period, rate, and processes of its collapse is largely unknown. Prior research had primarily focused on the inscriptions, monuments, and sculptures of Angkor; however, GAP III was focused more upon the habituation locations and well-known temple enclosures, including research done at Angkor Wat in 2013.

The three objectives of the project are:

1. To identify the ancestry of Angkor's spatial and social organization in the first millennium BCE.
2. To explore how the Angkor urban complex operated.
3. To discover how, when, and why the region was abandoned, and to explore its transformations through the 16th and 19th centuries which resulted in the modern landscape seen today.

=== Khmer Production and Exchange ===
Miriam Stark has worked with colleagues Peter Grave, Lisa Kealhofer and Ea Darith since 2012 on the Khmer Production and Exchange Project, whose goal is to understand Angkorian political economy through studying the production and distribution of Khmer stoneware ceramics. Working with colleagues across projects to develop a robust sample of kiln-based and consumption-site stonewares that establishes a set of geochemical signatures for Angkorian kilns (production centers) against which to compare geochemical patterning in geographically discrete areas of the Angkorian state (consumption centers. Currently identified Angkorian kilns cluster in the hinterland of Angkor, in and around Kulen, in NE Thailand (in provinces just north of the Dangrek Mountains), and in the Phnom Penh region. Scholars agree that most major Angkorian provincial temples probably had associated kilns, from long-used ritual localities like Sambor Prei Kuk and major provincial centers like Phimai to secondary provincial temples. Ultimately our work should bring together geochemical, radiometric and vessel form information on Khmer stonewares and their kiln complexes.

== Service ==
=== Community service ===
Miriam Stark has also served on the Committee on the Status of Women in Archaeology for the American Anthropological Association from 1997-2000 as well as multiple roles for the Society of American Archaeology, including Committee on Meetings Development, Committee for Excellence in Archaeological Research and Analysis, and Board Member at Large. From 2013-2016, Stark served on the Cultural Heritage Policy Committee of the Archaeological Institute of America, which primarily based its focus on the area of Southeast Asia. The committee sought to stop global trafficking of illegal artifacts, particularly of pre-Angkorian and Angkorian art in Cambodia.

She is a member of the Society for American Archaeology, the Indo-Pacific Prehistory Association, Sigma Xi, Phi Beta Kappa, American Anthropological Association, American Women in Science, Archaeological Institute of America, and the American Association of University Women. She has facilitated training workshops in the US and in Cambodia since 2012 and organized sessions and symposia at major conferences for more than 25 years. She currently serves on eight editorial advisory boards for international journals and was an Archaeological Institute of America national lecturer twice (2013-1014, 2015-2016). Dr. Stark currently directs the University of Hawai'i's Center for Southeast Asian Studies.

=== Teaching ===
Stark serves as undergraduate advisor in the department of anthropology at the University of Hawaiʻi at Mānoa, and has served in university service roles for the UHM College of Social Sciences Research Council, UHM/CSEAS Foreign Language Area Fellowships Committee, and the UHM Center for Southeast Asian Studies Executive Board. She teaches introductory courses in the four field approach of anthropology, in addition to archaeological courses such as Archaeological Theory and Interpretation, and Landscape Archaeology. Her emphasis on Southeast Asia is present in courses such as Southeast Asian Archaeology, Asian Archaeology, and East Asian Archaeology.

Miriam Stark advises graduate students as well as Ph.D candidates specializing in Southeast Asia, particularly in research involved in Cambodian and the Philippines. As recently as February 2018, Stark has conducted several lectures regarding Angkorian Khmers in the Mekong Delta at the University of California, Los Angeles (UCLA), the University of Southern California (USC) and various other institutions.

=== Spreading the Research ===
Dr. Stark has made major contributions to Southeast Asian archaeology, so in order to spread the word, she gives lectures about her team's findings. Stark and her team have done extensive research in Angkor, and have actively gone out to teach others about what they have done. The following contains her research from recent lectures.

She proposed that the Mekong Basin was a watery world, which lead to distinct patterns that made up everyday life there. The land surrounding the area where the Mekong River meets the sea, flooded for as long as four months per year. This led to the flooding of houses, which required rafts to provide transportation for the 17 million people who lived there. Due to saltwater intrusion, farming was made difficult and nearly impossible. The Tonle Sap, another one of Cambodia’s major rivers connected to the Mekong River, also experienced floods over both its river and lake components. Despite Cambodia's monsoon filled climate, Stark claims that the discovery of speleothems are the first records of droughts existing in Cambodia. This discovery was long before the drought experienced in the present-day region. Furthermore, the culture of these people considered water to be divine. They believed water management consisted of the belief that water came down from the source, and it was blessed by one of the gods (i.e. Shiva). Dr. Stark's research contains evidence that the Angkorian Khmers lived in, worshiped, and managed a watery world.

More of Stark's research describes the cosmology of water became part of this region’s culture, thereby elevating the importance of this natural element in Angkor. The region had various religious practices regarding the use of water. Before Buddhism became the central religion, these practices included the washing of religious statues with perfume water, making offerings to the temple that resulted in the spiritual spray of water, and the belief in spirits from the lakes and rivers that were derived from animism. The reintroduction of the Khok Thlok origin story tells the story of the Naga Princess, also known as the serpent princess, and her marriage to a foreign prince after taking him to her underwater kingdom. This further highlights how important water was to the sacred origins of the Angkorian Khmers.

Dr. Stark’s main project as of 2018 is the Greater Angkor Project and the epistemology that surrounds Angkor’s water system. She has described the 20 year process of making the Angkorian Urbanism Archaeological Map of Greater Angkor that has allowed archaeologists to understand urbanism and residential patterning in Southeast Asian states. Some of the information derived form this source is the possibility of low-density urbanism, the widespread and long term rural settlement configuration with deep historical roots, and the presence of a hamlet based pattern centered on a prasat shrine in Angkor. Living situations have also been described as a systematic map of mounds and depressions where temples served as magnets with people living around them in order to support these sacred buildings. For example, the spirits housed in these temples had to be fed daily, thus the need for support staff to live nearby. Households were also organized around ponds, and these ponds were critical to the living experiences of those who called Angkorian Cambodia home. Additionally, to be a king in this historical region, Stark has stated that contenders had to be able to use water storage as a form of protection for the people and as a replication of the cosmos.

Stark has found evidence for the reconstruction of the water system in this region that began in the 8th and 9th centuries. The Khmers began working with the rivers that already existed, and it eventually evolved into the 12th-century elaborate manipulation of water. The manipulation included the use of moats to keep water away from the city.

== Select publications ==
=== Articles ===
Murphy, Stephen A.; Stark, Miriam T. (2016/10). "Introduction: Transitions from late prehistory to early historic periods in mainland Southeast Asia, c. early to mid-first millennium CE". Journal of Southeast Asian Studies. 47 (3): 333–340. doi:10.1017/S0022463416000229. ISSN 0022-4634.

International encyclopedia of the social & behavioral sciences. Wright, James D., (Second edition ed.). Amsterdam. ISBN 9780080970868. OCLC 904209795.

Ikehara-Quebral, Rona M.; Stark, Miriam T.; Belcher, William; Vuthy, Voeun; Krigbaum, John; Bentley, R. Alexander; Douglas, Michele Toomay; Pietrusewsky, Michael (2017-10-25). "Biocultural Practices during the Transition to History at the Vat Komnou Cemetery, Angkor Borei, Cambodia". Asian Perspectives. 56 (2): 191–236. doi:10.1353/asi.2017.0008. ISSN 1535-8283.

Cultural transmission and material culture : breaking down boundaries. Stark, Miriam T., Bowser, Brenda J., 1957-, Horne, Lee., Kramer, Carol, 1943-2002. Tucson: University of Arizona Press. 2008. ISBN 0816526753. OCLC 226389404.

Aung-Thwin, Michael A.; Stark, Miriam T. (2001-05-01). "Editorial: Recent Developments in the Archaeology of Myanma Pyay (Burma): An Introduction". Asian Perspectives. 40 (1): 1–7. doi:10.1353/asi.2001.0001. ISSN 1535-8283.

=== Reviews ===
Stark, Miriam T. (2017-10-25). "Before Siam: Essays in Art and Archaeology ed. by Nicolas Revire, Stephen A. Murphy (review)". Asian Perspectives. 56 (2): 260–262. doi:10.1353/asi.2017.0010. ISSN 1535-8283. S2CID 165645904.

Sanderson, D.C.W.; Bishop, P.; Stark, M.T.; Spencer, J.Q. "Luminescence dating of anthropogenically reset canal sediments from Angkor Borei, Mekong Delta, Cambodia". Quaternary Science Reviews. 22 (10-13): 1111–1121. doi:10.1016/s0277-3791(03)00055-6.Professor of Anthropology at the University of Hawaii Manoa. Professor of Anthropology at the University of Hawaii Manoa.
