= University of Hawaiʻi Press =

Academic publisher

- Parent company: University of Hawaiʻi
- Founded: 1947; 79 years ago
- Country of origin: United States
- Headquarters location: Honolulu
- Distribution: self-distributed (US, Asia); Scholarly Book Services (Canada); Eurospan Group (EMEA)
- Publication types: Books, Academic journals
- Official website: uhpress.hawaii.edu

The University of Hawaiʻi Press is a university press that is part of the University of Hawaiʻi.

The University of Hawaiʻi Press was founded in 1947, publishing research in all disciplines of the humanities and natural and social sciences in the regions of Asia and the Pacific. In addition to scholarly monographs, the press publishes educational materials and reference works such as dictionaries, language texts, classroom readers, atlases, and encyclopedias.

The press is currently a member of the Association of University Presses.

== History ==
The press was established in 1947 at the initiative of University of Hawaiʻi president Gregg M. Sinclair. Its first publications included a reprint of The Hawaiian Kingdom by Ralph Kuykendall and Insects of Hawaii, by Elwood C. Zimmerman, both of which have become classics. Other enduring classics from its early years include the Hawaiian-English Dictionary, by Mary Kawena Pukui and Samuel Elbert, first published in 1957, last revised and enlarged in 1986, then reprinted 16 times; and Shoal of Time: A History of the Hawaiian Islands, by Gavan Daws, whose Press edition was first published in 1974 and reprinted 19 times.

In 1971, the University of Hawaiʻi Press combined operations with the East-West Center Press and renamed itself the University Press of Hawaiʻi, thus adding greater coverage of Asia to its previous strength in Hawaiʻi and the Pacific. In 1981, the East-West Center withdrew its subsidy, and the name reverted to University of Hawaiʻi Press, but the focus on Asia continued to grow, so that at least half its titles now focus on Asia, with the other half devoted to Hawaiʻi (30%) and the Pacific (20%).

UH Press output included journals from the very beginning. Most of the press's inaugural budget appropriation was allocated to the journal Pacific Science, whose first issue appeared in 1947. However, Pacific Science did not bear the UH Press imprint until 1953, two years after Philosophy East and West made its debut from UH Press (Kamins & Potter 1998: pages 234–240).

The number of journals gradually expanded over the next few decades, with the acquisition of Oceanic Linguistics (in volume V) in 1966 and Asian Perspectives (in volume XII) in 1969, and the founding of Korean Studies in 1977, Biography in 1978, Buddhist-Christian Studies in 1981, and Asian Theatre Journal in 1984, all initiated at the University of Hawaiʻi. Flush State budgets in the late 1980s and early 1990s permitted several further initiatives by other campus departments. The literary journal Mānoa and the "island affairs" journal The Contemporary Pacific made their debut in 1989, followed by the Journal of World History in 1990, and then China Review International in 1994, just before severe budget cutbacks eliminated all university subsidies to the Journals Department.

Journals production struggled along, with some editorial offices assuming more of the burden, until Press subsidies were partially restored in 1998 and the department was restaffed. All 12 journals made their debut in the Project MUSE database of journals in the humanities and social sciences in 2000–2001, but Pacific Science switched to the BioOne collection of natural science journals in 2008. The Yearbook of the Association of Pacific Coast Geographers began publishing with UH Press in 2000 (in volume 62) and made its debut in Project MUSE in 2004. The Asia Society's Archives of Asian Art began publishing with UH Press in 2007 (in volume 57).

== Book Editorial Program ==
During the 2007 fiscal year, the press considered approximately 1,300 manuscripts and proposals, of which 60 were accepted for publication by the editorial board. As of 30 June 2007, 122 books were in press. Each book undergoes rigorous review, including preliminary evaluation by an in-house editor. Manuscripts that show promise are then evaluated by two external readers who are specialists in the subject matter. Those that receive two positive peer reviews are presented to the press's academic editorial board, which makes the final determination about whether to publish.

East Asia is an especially important regional focus. During 2000–2005, the press published 184 academic monographs on the region, 82 on China, 81 on Japan, and 21 on Korea. The three principal subject areas were language and literature (with 23 on China, 25 on Japan, and 7 on Korea); religion and philosophy (with 21 on China, 13 on Japan, and 2 on Korea); and history and fine arts (with 20 on China, 20 on Japan, and 7 on Korea) (Chen & Wang 2008:38).

The monograph series published by the press indicate some principal areas of concentration.

- ABC Chinese Dictionary Series (ed. by Victor Mair)
- Critical Interventions (ed. by Sheldon Lu)
- Dimensions of Asian Spirituality (ed. by Henry Rosemont, Jr.)
- Hawai‘i Studies on Korea (with the UH Center for Korean Studies)
- Intersections (with the UCLA Asian American Studies Center)
- KLEAR Textbooks in Korean Language (with the Korean Language Education and Research Center)
- Kuroda Classics in East Asian Buddhism and Studies in East Asian Buddhism (with the Kuroda Institute for the Study of Buddhism and Human Values)
- Modern Korean Fiction (ed. by Bruce Fulton)
- Monographs of the Biographical Research Center (Honolulu)
- Monographs of the Center for Southeast Asian Studies (with the Kyoto University Center for Southeast Asian Studies)
- Monographs of the Society for Asian and Comparative Philosophy
- Nanzan Library of Asian Religion and Culture (with the Nanzan Institute for Religion and Culture, Nagoya)
- Oceanic Linguistics Special Publications (with the UH Department of Linguistics)
- PALI Language Texts (with the UH Social Science Research Institute)
- Pacific Islands Monograph Series (with the UH Center for Pacific Islands Studies)
- South Sea Books (with the UH Center for Pacific Islands Studies)
- Perspectives on the Global Past (ed. by Jerry H. Bentley and Anand Yang)
- Pure Land Buddhist Studies (with the Institute of Buddhist Studies, Berkeley)
- Studies in the Buddhist Traditions (with the University of Michigan Institute for the Study of the Buddhist Traditions)
- Spatial Habitus: Making and Meaning in Asia's Architecture (ed. by Ronald Knapp and Xing Ruan)
- Southeast Asia: Politics, Meaning and Memory (ed. by Rita Smith Kipp and David P. Chandler)
- Topics in Contemporary Buddhism (ed. by George Tanabe, Jr.)
- Writing Past Colonialism (with the Institute for Colonial Studies, Melbourne)
- The World of East Asia (ed. by Joshua Fogel)

== Marketing and sales ==
The press is represented in North America and Hawai‘i by independent commission sales representatives; in Europe, Africa, and the Middle East by London-based Eurospan Publishers Group; and in the Pacific and Asia region by its sales subsidiary, East-West Export Books (EWEB). EWEB also represents 55 other university presses and scholarly publishers in Asia and the Pacific. The press maintains stock in warehouses in Pennsylvania, Honolulu, Canada, and England, and serves as a distributor for over 50 publishers and several individuals, providing sales, marketing, promotion, warehouse, and business services on a commission basis.

Each year the press displays its recently published books and journals at a range of professional meetings and trade shows held throughout the world, reaching a combined total of about 700,000 attendees at those events. The annual meeting of the Association for Asian Studies is its most important academic exhibit each year. Other major scholarly venues include the American Academy of Religion, American Anthropological Association, American Historical Association, American Library Association, Association for Asian American Studies, and College Art Association. Principal trade show venues have included the Australian Book Fair, BookExpo America, Canadian Booksellers Association Trade Fair, Frankfurt Book Fair, Los Angeles Times Festival of Books, and Taipei International Book Fair.

For the 2007 fiscal year, the top five bestselling books by dollar revenue were the revised and enlarged edition of the Hawaiian Dictionary by Mary Kawena Pukui and Samuel H. Elbert; the Beginning 1 volume of the Integrated Korean textbook series by the Korean Language Education and Research Center (KLEAR); Broken Trust by Samuel P. King and Randall W. Roth; the 4th edition of Japanese Culture by Paul Varley, and the 3rd edition of the Atlas of Hawaiʻi by Sonia P. Juvik, James O. Juvik, and Thomas R. Paradise.

== Journals ==
The Journals Department currently handles production, manufacturing, fulfillment, and delivery for the following scholarly journals.

- Archives of Asian Art, sponsored by the Asia Society
- Asian Perspectives: The Journal of Archaeology for Asia and the Pacific
- Asian Theatre Journal, journal of the Association for Asian Performance
- Biography: An Interdisciplinary Quarterly, sponsored by the Biographical Research Center
- Buddhist-Christian Studies, journal of the Society for Buddhist-Christian Studies
- China Review International, reviews of scholarly literature in Chinese studies
- The Contemporary Pacific: A Journal of Island Affairs, sponsored by the UH Center for Pacific Islands Studies
- Cross-Currents: East Asian History and Culture Review, sponsored by Research Institute of Korean Studies, Korea University, and Institute of East Asian Studies, University of California, Berkeley
- Journal of World History, journal of the World History Association
- Korean Studies, sponsored by the UH Center for Korean Studies
- Language Documentation & Conservation, sponsored by the UH National Foreign Language Resource Center
- Mānoa: A Pacific Journal of International Writing
- Oceanic Linguistics, sponsored by the UH Department of Linguistics
- Pacific Science, journal of the Pacific Science Association
- Philosophy East and West, sponsored by the UH Department of Philosophy
- Yearbook of the Association of Pacific Coast Geographers

The department also distributes two journals.

- Azalea: Journal of Korean Literature & Culture for the Korea Institute, Harvard University
- Journal of Korean Religions for the Institute for the Study of Religion at Sogang University

== See also ==
- List of English-language book publishing companies
- List of university presses
