= Yearbook of the Association of Pacific Coast Geographers =

Journal

- Discipline: geography
- Language: English

Publication details
- History: 1935-present
- Publisher: University of Hawaii Press (United States)
- Frequency: Annual

Standard abbreviations
- ISO 4: Yearb. Assoc. Pac. Coast Geogr.

Indexing
- CODEN: YAPGAJ
- ISSN: 0066-9628 (print); 1551-3211 (web)
- LCCN: 37013376
- OCLC no.: 01518443

Links
- Journal homepage; Online access at Project MUSE

The Yearbook of the Association of Pacific Coast Geographers is a peer-reviewed annual academic journal covering education and research in geography. It is an official journal of the Association of Pacific Coast Geographers (APCG) and was established in 1935. It has been published annually except during the war years of 1943–1946. Its first editor-in-chief was Otis Willard Freeman (Eastern Washington University; vols. 1–5, 1935–1940). Its longest-serving editor was Darrick Danta (California State University, Northridge; vols. 59–68, 1997–2006). The current editor is James Craine (California State University, Northridge).

From 1965 through 1996 (vols. 27–58) the yearbook was published by Oregon State University Press, from 1997 through 1999 (vols. 59–61) by the APCG, and since 2000 (vol. 62) by the University of Hawaiʻi Press. Its first electronic edition appeared in 2004 on Project MUSE.
