= Association for Asian Performance =

The Association for Asian Performance (AAP) is an international non-profit organization dedicated to the dissemination and preservation of Asian theatre, performance techniques, and history. The Association focuses on scholarship, education, and exposure to these techniques through their conferences and lectures at Association for Theatre in Higher Education (ATHE) and their recurring official publication, the Asian Theatre Journal.

== Association History ==
The Association for Asian Performance went through several name iterations from its formation in 1965 through the present. From 1969 to 1987, different titles and organization intentions were chosen following a unanimous 1969 split of the Afro-Asian Theatre Project into separate cultural organizations, structural changes and debt failures with their first sponsor, the American Educational Theatre Association (AETA), second sponsor American Theatre Association, and finally, their journey to ATHE sponsorship.

The different versions of the AAP from 1965 to present are:

Sponsored by AETA:

- Afro-Asian Theatre Project (1965 – 1969)
- Asian Theatre Project (1969 – 1971)

Sponsored by ATA:

- Asian Theatre Program (1972 – 1986)

Sponsored by ATHE:

- Association for the Study of Asian Performance (1986 – 1987)
- Association for Asian Performance (1987 – present)

== Publication history ==
The organization’s first published journal was the Afro-Asian Theatre Bulletin (1965 – 1970). In 1971, Sam Leiter, professor at Brooklyn College-CUNY, became the next editor of the new version of the Association’s journal, the Asian Theatre Bulletin. The Bulletin struggled to survive during an upheaval of ATA sponsor funding during the Asian Theatre Program years. Members were concerned that the budget cuts from within their division of ATA, the University and College Theatre Association (UCTA), would shut out the voices and stories of minority programs within ATA. Eventually, funding was cut entirely and publication halted altogether.

Following this period, in 1984, the Asian Theatre Program established its first independent subscription of the Asian Theatre Journal, a publication for all peer-reviewed articles relating to the art of Asian theatre performance. The Founding Co-Editors of the Asian Theatre Journal were James R. Brandon and Elizabeth Wichmann-Walczak.
