= List of Japanese apple cultivars =

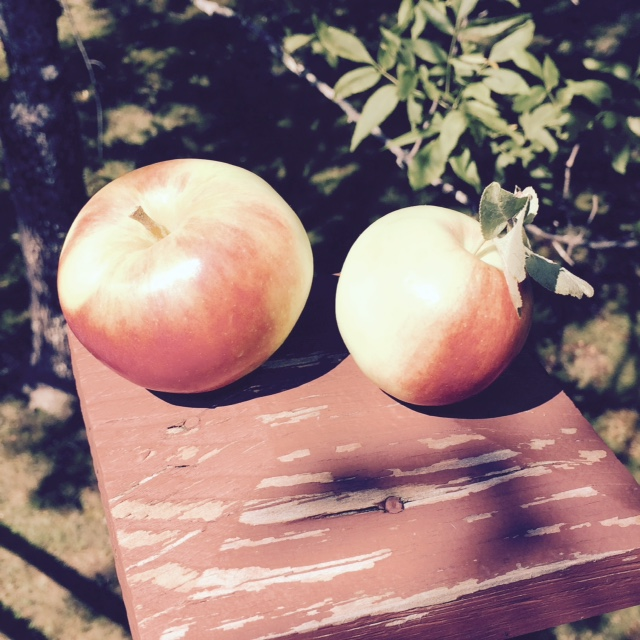
Sansa apples in a Connecticut orchard (2016)

This is a list of Japanese apple cultivars which includes apple cultivars, as well as hybrid cultivars, invented in Japan.

== List ==
- Hokuto
- Akane which is named for the word Akane (meaning deep red).
  - Sansa
- Fuji which is named after Fujisaki, Aomori.
  - Yataka Fuji
  - Daybreak Fuji
  - Yahagi
- Indo
- Mutsu or Crispin which is named after the Mutsu Province.
  - Shizuka
- Orin
- Sekai Ichi
- Shinano Sweet
- Tsugaru
- Toki
