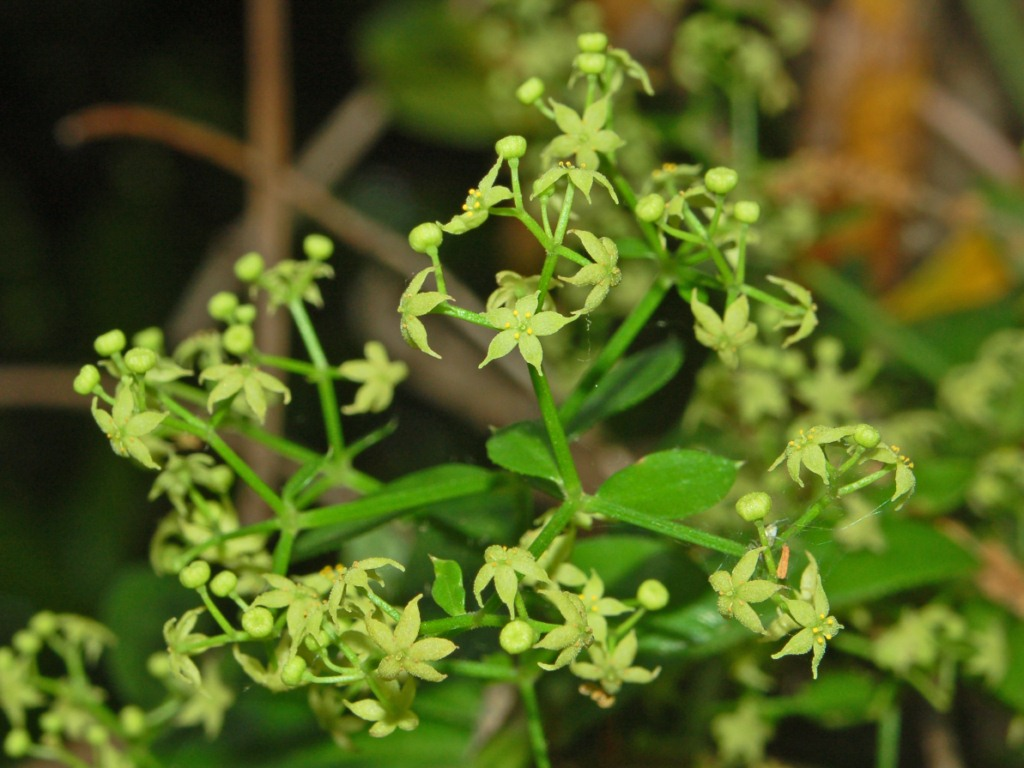
- Flowers of Rubia peregrina

Scientific classification
- Kingdom: Plantae
- Clade: Tracheophytes
- Clade: Angiosperms
- Clade: Eudicots
- Clade: Asterids
- Order: Gentianales
- Family: Rubiaceae
- Genus: Rubia
- Species: R. peregrina

Binomial name
- Rubia peregrina L.

= Rubia peregrina =

Species of flowering plant in the coffee family

Rubia peregrina, the common wild madder, is a herbaceous perennial plant species belonging to the bedstraw and coffee family Rubiaceae.

== Etymology ==
The genus name Rubia derives from the Latin ruber meaning "red", as the roots of some species (mainly Rubia tinctorum) have been used since ancient times as a vegetable red dye. The specific epithet is the Latin adjective peregrinus, -a, -um meaning "foreign, alien, exotic, strange."

== Description ==
The stem is woody, hairless, square and climbing and reaches on average 50–250 centimetres (20–98 in) long. The evergreen leaves are sessile, glossy, leathery, oval-lanceolate and toothed on the margins. They are arranged in whorls, usually with five or more leaves radiating from a single node. The small flowers have five petals and are pale green-yellowish, about 5–7 mm in diameter, arranged at the top of long stalks. The flowering period extends from April through June. The hermaphroditic flowers are pollinated by insects (entomogamy). The fruits are fleshy green berries, black when ripe, about 5 mm (0.20 in) in diameter.

== Distribution ==
It is mainly present in Mediterranean Europe (Portugal, Spain, France, Italy, Greece and former Yugoslavia), in Great Britain and in North Africa.

== Habitat ==
This stress resistant weed is typical of Mediterranean scrub. It grows in thickets, bushes, hedges, stony grounds and along the roads and paths. It prefers dry soils, at an altitude of 0–1,000 metres (0–3,281 ft) above sea level.

== Gallery ==
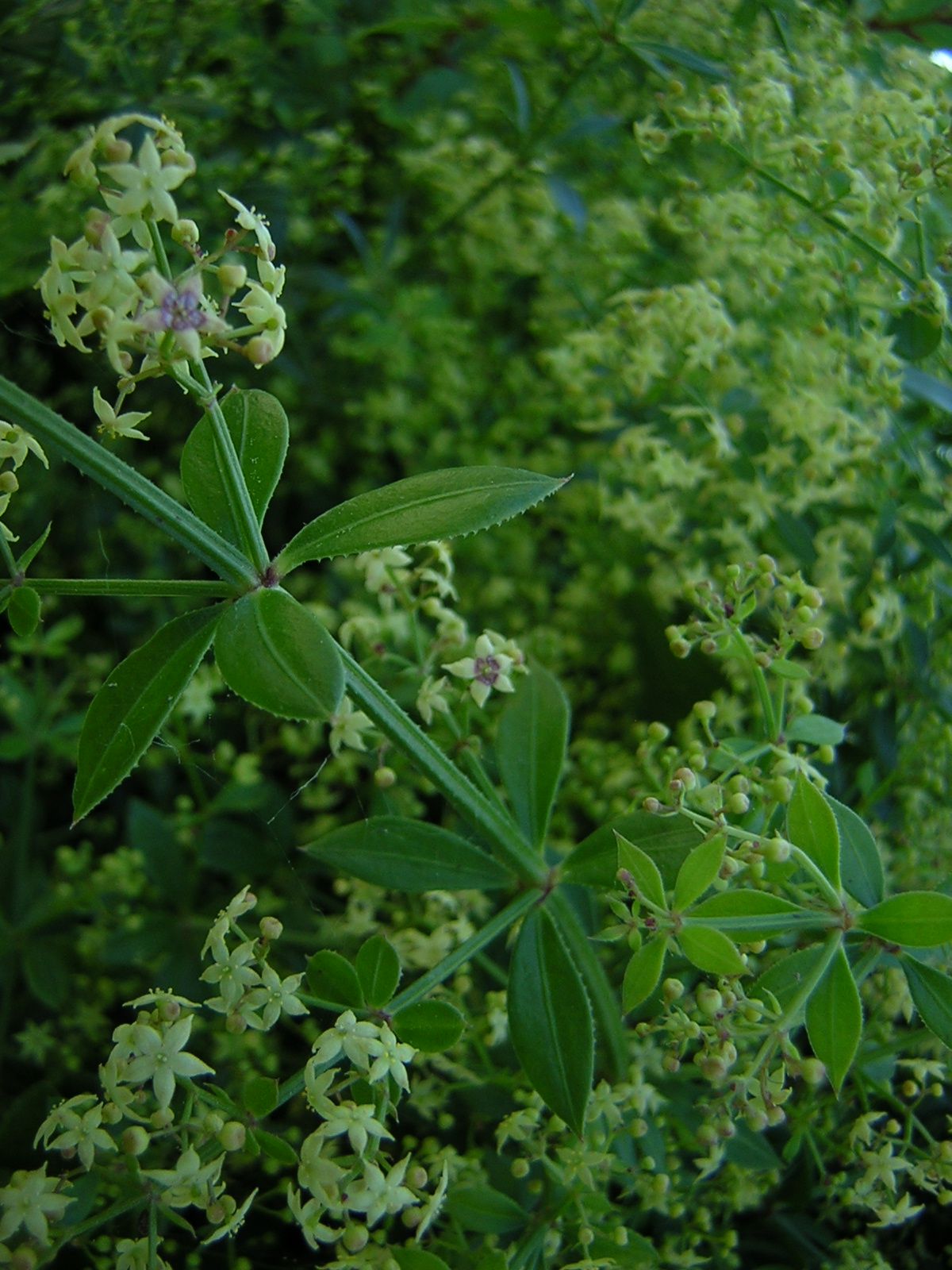
Plant of Rubia peregrina

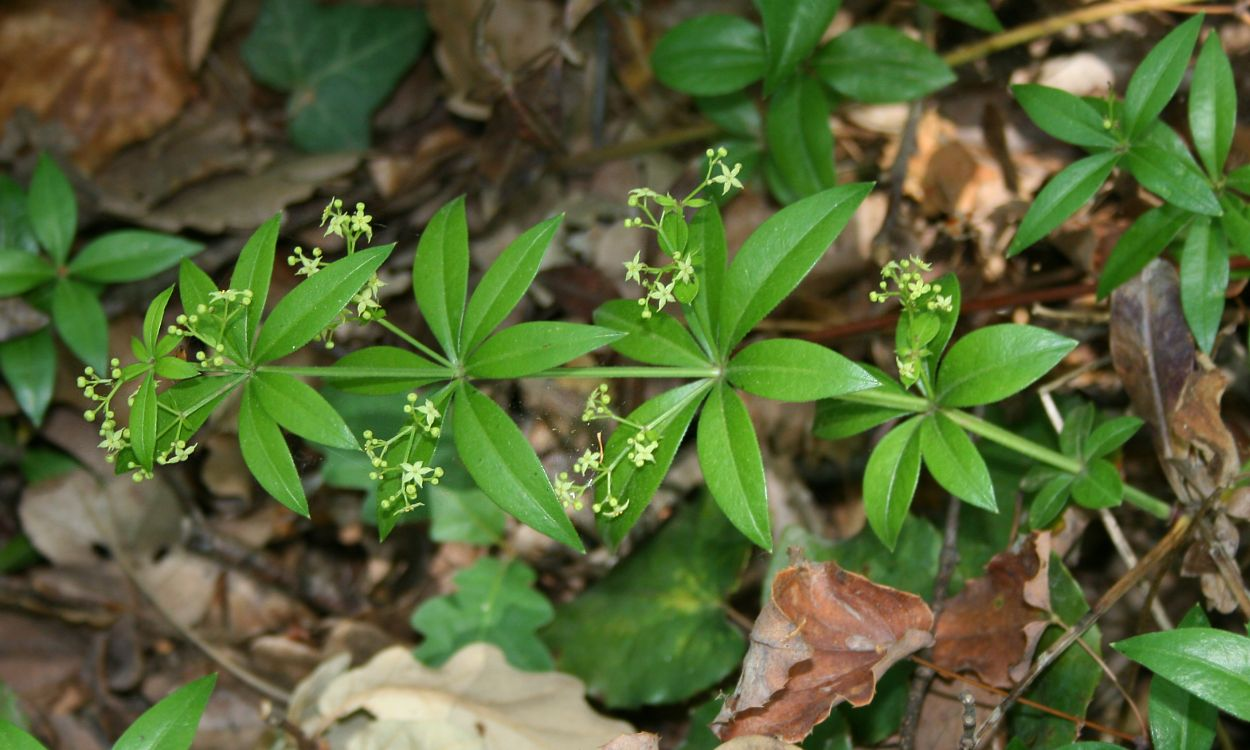
Plant of Rubia peregrina

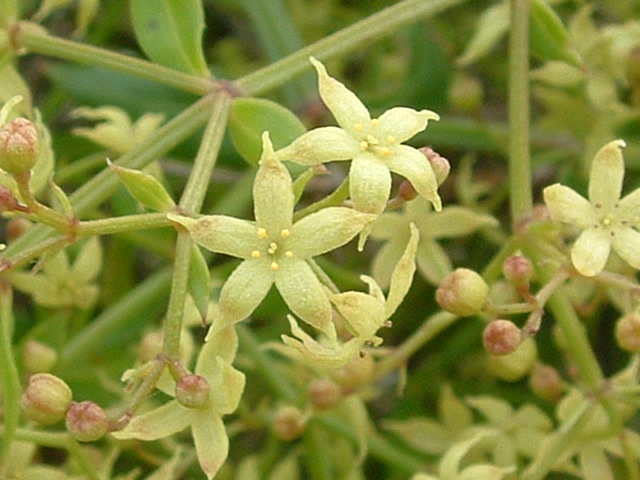
Close-up on a flowers of Rubia peregrina

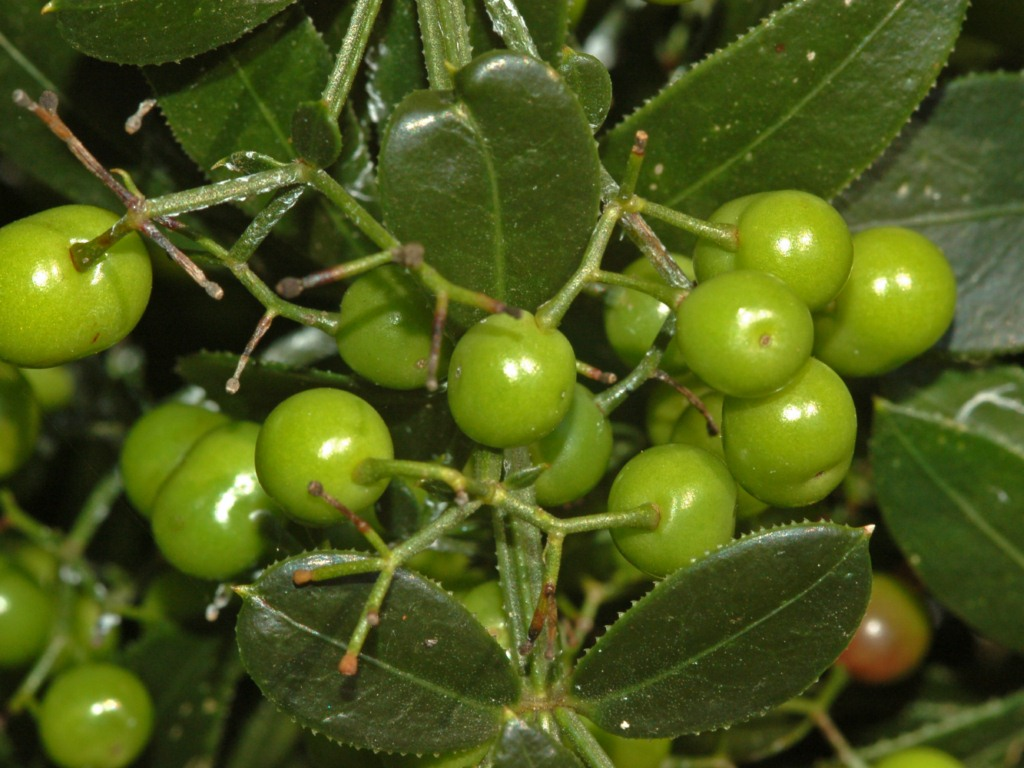
Fruits of Rubia peregrina

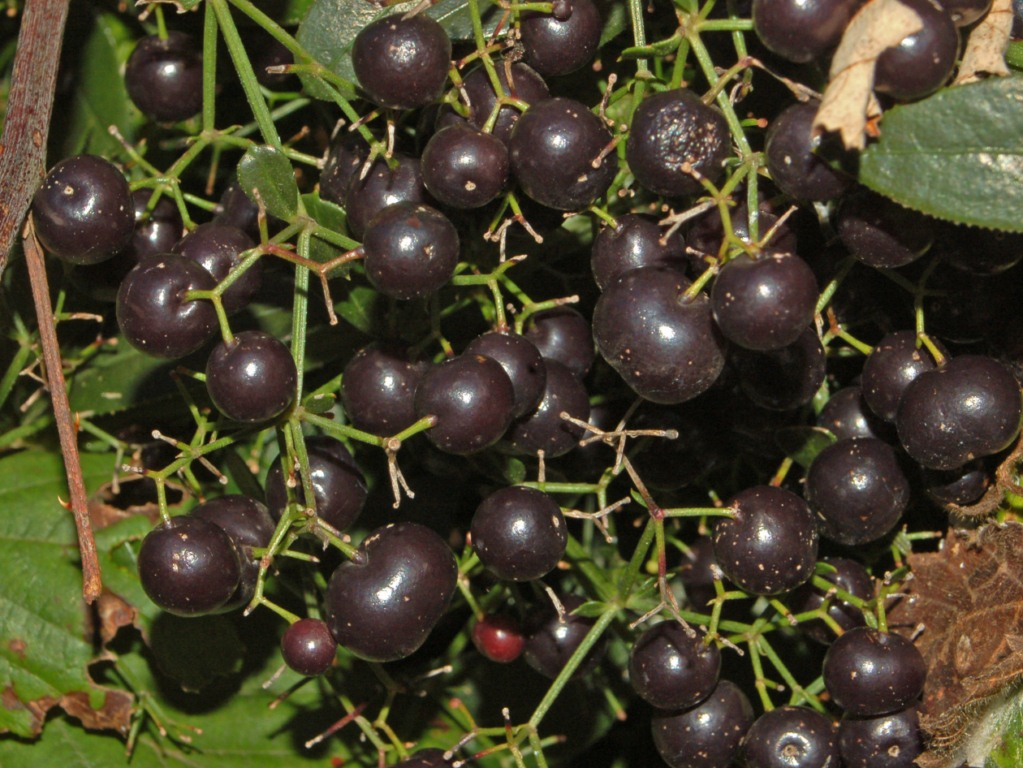
Ripe fruits of Rubia peregrina

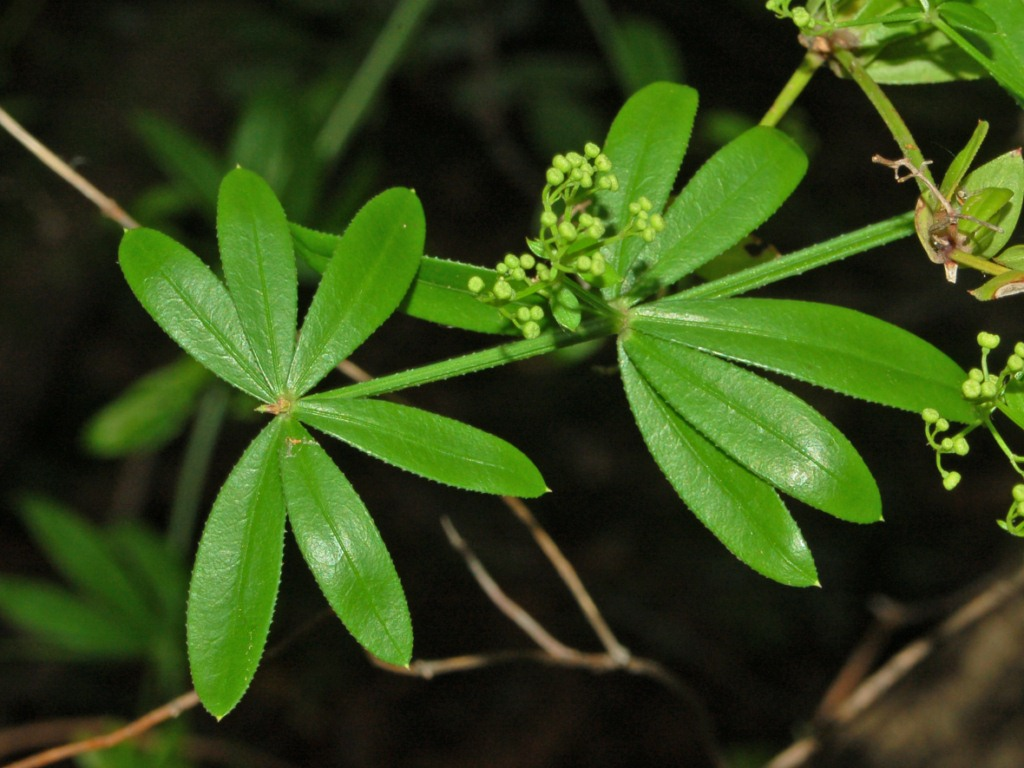
Leaves of Rubia peregrina

== Synonyms ==
- Rubia anglica Huds. (1762)
- Rubia angustifolia L. (1767)
- Rubia lucida L. (1767)
- Rubia bocconii Petagna (1787)
- Rubia longifolia Poir.
- Rubia splendens Hoffmanns. & Link (1824)
- Rubia requienii Duby (1830)
- Rubia dalmatica Scheele (1844)
- Rubia angustifolia var. requienii (Duby) Nyman (1879)
- Rubia peregrina var. dalmatica (Scheele) Nyman (1879)
- Rubia peregrina var. lucida (L.) Nyman (1879)
- Rubia peregrina var. splendens (Hoffmanns. & Link) Nyman (1879)
- Rubia erratica Bubani (1899)
- Rubia reiseri Halácsy ex Hayek (1930)
- Rubia peregrina subsp. longifolia (Poir.) O.Bolòs (1969)
- Rubia peregrina var. requienii (Duby) Cardona (1974)
- Rubia peregrina subsp. requienii (Duby) Cardona & Sierra (1980)
- Rubia agostinhoi Dans. et Silva
- Rubia peregrina subsp. agostinhoi (Dans. et Silva) Valdés et G.López
