= Akane (disambiguation) =

Akane is a Japanese surname and given name, from the Japanese word for deep red.

Akane may also refer to:

- Akane (apple), a Japanese apple cultivar
- "Akane", a song by Miyu Nagase
- a synonym of Rubia argyi, a source of the dye madder

== See also ==
- Akanés, a Greek sweet
- Akanye, a sound change in Slavic languages
