= Zenodochium (disambiguation) =

Zenodochium is a genus of moths in the family Blastobasidae.
