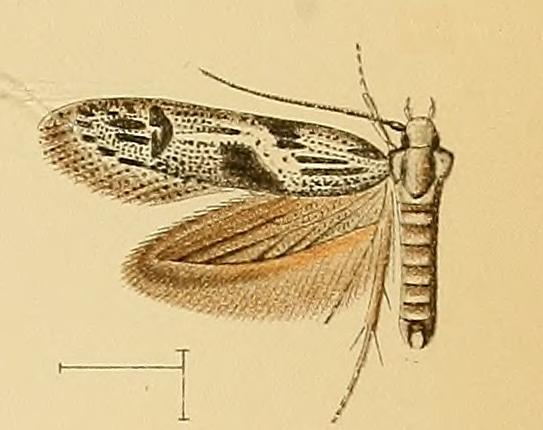

Scientific classification
- Domain: Eukaryota
- Kingdom: Animalia
- Phylum: Arthropoda
- Class: Insecta
- Order: Lepidoptera
- Family: Blastobasidae
- Genus: Zenodochium
- Species: Z. polyphagum

Binomial name
- Zenodochium polyphagum Walsingham, 1908

Synonyms
- Blastobasis polyphagum

= Zenodochium polyphagum =

Species of moth

Zenodochium polyphagum is a moth in the family Blastobasidae. It is found on the Canary Islands.

The wingspan is 13–20 mm. The forewings are usually dirty whitish, but may vary from clear white to a dull ash colour. The hindwings are brownish grey.

Larvae have been reared on debris of various plants, including Artemisia canariensis, Allagopappus dichotomus, Senecio kleinia, Sonchus gummifer, Pinus canariensis, Rubia fruticosa, Cytisus proliferus and Rhus coriaria. They may bore into the stem of a host plant before pupation.
