= Sumire =

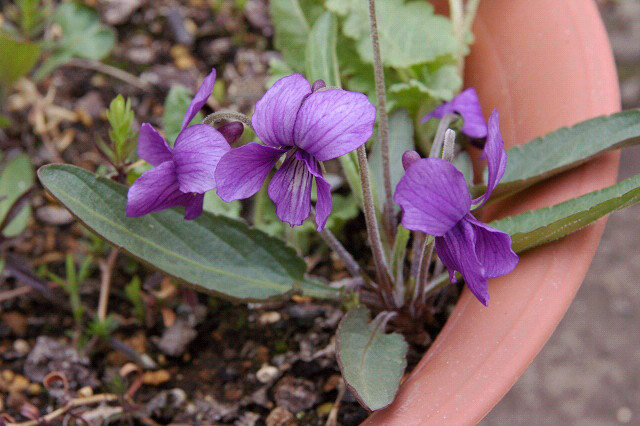
- Viola mandshurica (Fuji Dawn)
- Pronunciation: IPA: [sɨmʲiɾe̞] approx: SOO-MEE-REH
- Gender: Female
- Language: Japanese

Origin
- Meaning: It can have many different meanings depending on the kanji used.
- Region of origin: Japanese

Other names
- Related names: Akane; Tsubaki; Sakura

Sumire (菫, すみれ, スミレ) is a feminine Japanese given name.

== Written forms ==
Sumire can be written using different kanji characters and can mean:

- 菫, "violet"

as a name

- 紫花, "purple, flower"
- 純麗, "purity, lovely"
- 澄玲, "lucidity, sound of jewels"
- 澄麗, "lucidity, lovely"

The name can also be written in hiragana or katakana.

== People with the name ==
- Sumire (model) (純恋; 1987–2009), Japanese fashion model
- Sumire Haruno (春野 寿美礼; born 1972), Japanese actress
- Sumire Hata (秦澄美鈴; born 1996), Japanese track and field athlete
- Sumire Kikuchi (菊池 純礼; born 1996), Japanese speed skater
- Sumire Kita (喜田 純鈴; born 2001), Japanese rhythmic gymnast
- Sumire Matsubara (松原 すみれ; born 1990), better known as Sumire, Japanese fashion model and actress
- Sumire Miyachi (宮地すみれ; born 2005), Japanese idol
- Sumire Morohoshi (諸星 すみれ; born 1999), Japanese voice actress
- Sumire Nakamura (仲邑 菫; born 2009), Japanese Go player
- Sumire Natsu (夏 すみれ; born 1992), Japanese professional wrestler
- Sumire Satō (佐藤 すみれ; born 1993), Japanese idol
- Sumire Suto (須藤 澄玲; born 1997), Japanese pair skater
- Sumire Tsuji (辻 すみれ; born 1999), Japanese fencer
- Sumire Uesaka (上坂 すみれ; born 1991), Japanese voice actress
- Sumire Yoshida (吉田 菫; born 1992), Japanese musician

== Fictional characters ==
- Sumire (スミレ), a character in the anime film Garakowa: Restore the World
- Sumire, protagonist of the novel Sputnik Sweetheart
- Sumire Hanano (花野 菫), a character in the manga series Chihayafuru
- Sumire Hara (原 寿美鈴), a character in the manga series Assassination Classroom
- Sumire Heanna (平安名 すみれ), a character in the media franchise Love Live! Superstar!!
- Sumire Hikami (氷上 スミレ), a character in the anime series Aikatsu!
- Sumire Hirose (弘世 菫), a character in the manga series Saki
- Sumire Hoshino (星野 スミレ), a character in the manga series Perman
- Sumire Iwaya (巌谷 澄麗), protagonist of the manga series Tramps Like Us
- Sumire Kakei (筧 スミレ), a character in the manga series Boruto
- Sumire Kano (狩野 すみれ), a character in the light novel series Toradora!
- Sumire Kanzaki (神崎 すみれ), a character in the media franchise Sakura Wars
- Sumire Kasugano (春日野 すみれ), a character in the anime series Sally the Witch
- Sumire Nekoyashiki (猫屋敷すみれ), a character in the anime series Wonderful Pretty Cure!
- Sumire Nono (野乃すみれ), a character in the anime series Hug! Pretty Cure
- Sumire Otohana (乙花 スミレ), a character in the game series Blue Archive
- Sumire Ryuzaki (竜崎 スミレ), a character in the manga series The Prince of Tennis
- Sumire Saitō (斉藤 菫), a character in the manga series K-On!
- Sumire Saitozaki, a character in the video game Yandere Simulator
- Sumire Shinohara (篠原 スミレ), a character in the anime series Super Doll Licca-chan
- Sumire Shouda (正田 スミレ), a character in the manga series Gakuen Alice
- Sumire Takahana (鷹花 スミレ), protagonist of the manga series Venus Versus Virus
- Sumire Uemoto (上本 スミレ), a character in the manga series The World God Only Knows
- Sumire Yoshizawa (芳澤 すみれ), a character in the video game Persona 5 Royal
- Sumire (スミレ), the main protagonist from the manga series, The Splendid Work of a Monster Maid
