= Sansa =

Sansa may refer to:

== Arts, entertainment, and media ==
- Sansa (film), 2003 French film
- Sansa Stark, a fictional character from A Song of Ice and Fire book series, and the adaptation, Game of Thrones

== Brands and enterprises ==
- Sansa Airlines (Servicios Aéreos Nacionales S.A.), an airline based in San José, Costa Rica
- SanDisk portable media players, now known as SanDisk Clip, formerly Sansa

== People ==
- Honinbo Sansa, a Buddhist priest
- Maya Sansa, an Italian actress

== Other uses ==
- Sansa (temple), Korean Buddhist temples
- Sansa, a mbira or "thumb piano"
- Sansa, Pyrénées-Orientales, a commune in France
- Sansa, Turkey, a village in Üzümlü District in Turkey
- Sansa apple, a dessert apple, cross of the Japanese Akane and New Zealand Gala varietals
- South African National Space Agency, or SANSA
