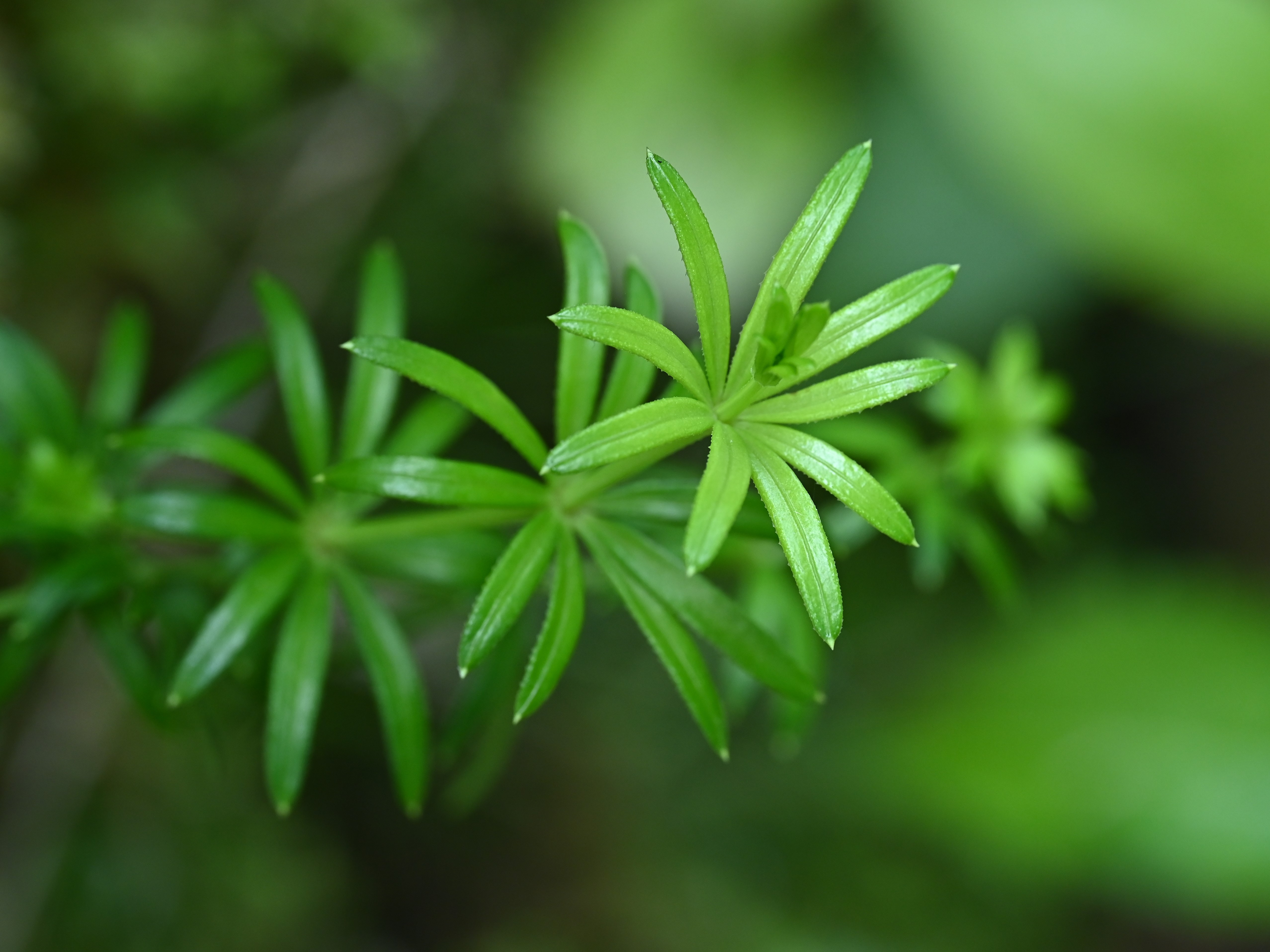

Scientific classification
- Kingdom: Plantae
- Clade: Embryophytes
- Clade: Tracheophytes
- Clade: Spermatophytes
- Clade: Angiosperms
- Clade: Eudicots
- Clade: Asterids
- Order: Gentianales
- Family: Rubiaceae
- Genus: Rubia
- Species: R. agostinhoi

Binomial name
- Rubia agostinhoi Dansereau and A. R. Pinto da Silva

Synonyms
- Rubia peregrina subsp. agostinhoi (Dans. & P.Silva) Valdés Berm. & G.López

= Rubia agostinhoi =

Species of plant

Rubia agostinhoi is a climbing plant species of the Rubiaceae family endemic to the Azores It was described by ecologists Pierre Dansereau and Pinto da Silva in 1977.

== Description ==
Rubia agostinhoi has branched, glabrous, brushed or smooth stems, up to 3 metres (9.8 ft) long. It has narrowly elliptical to linear or oblanceolate leathery, dark green leaves with very small, slightly revolted spines in the margins. Leaves of the side shoots are shorter and smaller in length than those of the main stem. Flower stems are 1–6 centimetres (0.39–2.36 in) long and usually very flowery. Fruits are 5–10 millimetres (0.20–0.39 in), globose and shiny black when ripe.

== Distribution and habitat ==
It is present in all of the Azorean islands, except Graciosa. It is commonly found in ravines, craters, natural forests and heather bushes. From sea level to altitudes above 1,000 metres (3,300 ft).
