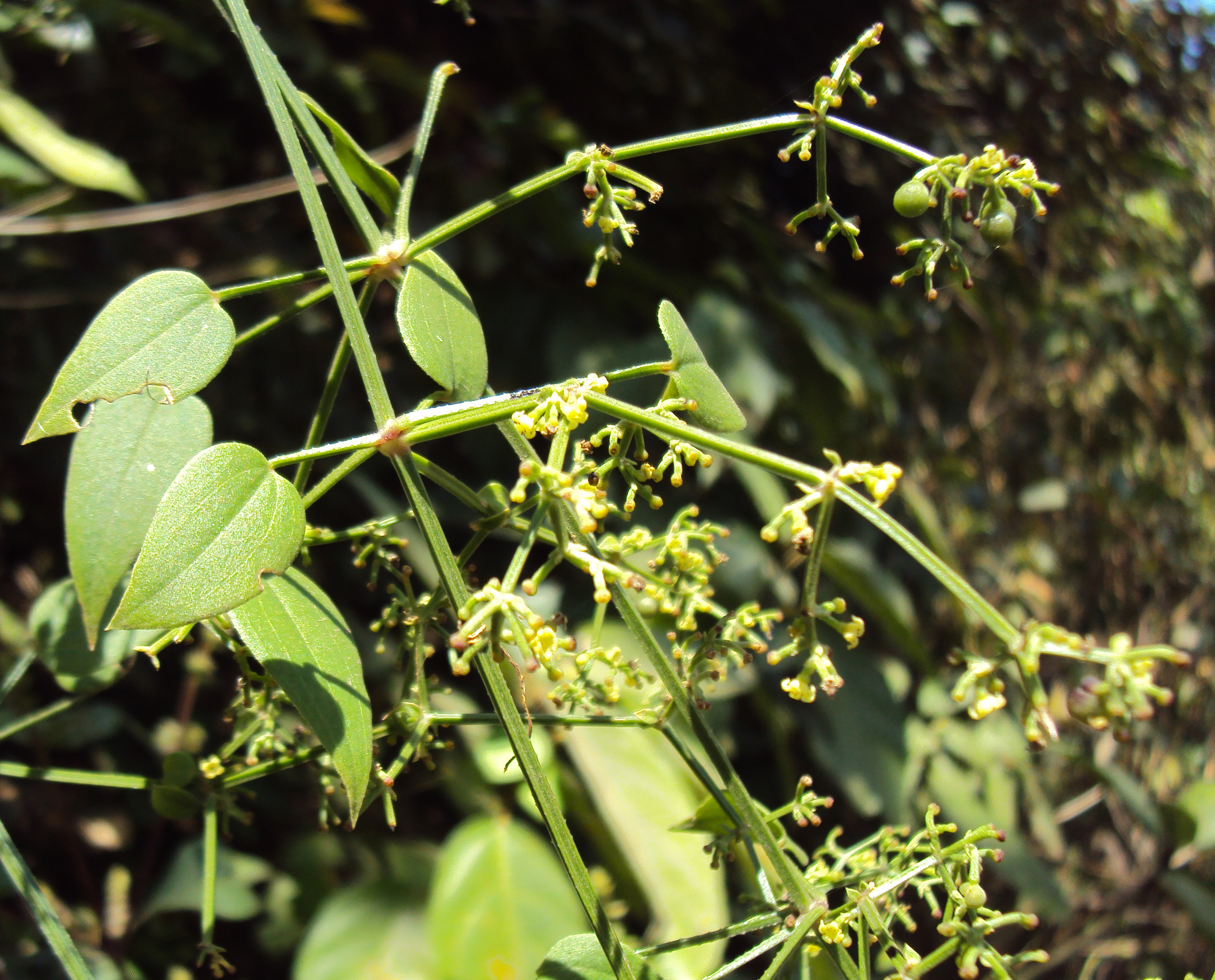

Scientific classification
- Kingdom: Plantae
- Clade: Tracheophytes
- Clade: Angiosperms
- Clade: Eudicots
- Clade: Asterids
- Order: Gentianales
- Family: Rubiaceae
- Genus: Rubia
- Species: R. cordifolia

Binomial name
- Rubia cordifolia L.

= Rubia cordifolia =

Species of flowering plant

Rubia cordifolia, known as Indian madder, is a species of flowering plant in the coffee family, Rubiaceae. It has been cultivated for a red pigment derived from roots.

== Description ==
It can grow to 3.5 m in height. The evergreen leaves are usually lanceolate or ovate and are 1.5–4 cm long and 0.5–1.5 cm broad, produced in whorls of 4-8 starlike around the central stem. It climbs with tiny hooks at the leaves and stems. The flowers are small (3–5 mm across), with five pale yellow petals, in dense racemes, arranged in a panicle. They consist of several to many flowers, found at both the ends of branches and in the leaf axils. The flowers appear from August to September, followed by small (4–6 mm diameter) red to black berries from October to November. The roots can be over 1 m long, up to 12 mm thick. It prefers loamy soils with a constant level of moisture. Madders are used as food plants for the larvae of some Lepidoptera species including Hummingbird hawk moth.

== Uses ==
Rubia cordifolia was the source of an economically important red pigment in many regions of Asia, Europe and Africa. It was extensively cultivated from antiquity until the mid-nineteenth century. The plant's roots contain an anthraquinone called purpurin (1,2,4-Trihydroxyanthraquinone) that gives it its red colour when used as a textile dye. It was also used as a colourant, especially for paint, that is referred to as Madder lake. The substance was also derived from other species; Rubia tinctorum, also widely cultivated, and the Asiatic species Rubia argyi (H. Léveillé & Vaniot) H. Hara ex Lauener [synonym = Rubia akane Nakai, based on the Japanese Aka (アカ or あか) = red, and ne (ネ or ね) = root]. The invention of a synthesized duplicate, an anthracene compound called alizarin, greatly reduced demand for the natural derivative.

The roots of Rubia cordifolia are also the source of a medicine used in Ayurveda; this is commonly known in Ayurvedic Sanskrit as Manjistha (or Manjista or Manjishta) and the commercial product in Hindi as Manjith.

It is known as btsod (Tibetan: བཙོད་, Wylie: btsod, THL: tsö) in Traditional Tibetan Medicine where it is used to treat blood disorders; spread heat (Tibetan: འགྲམས་ཚད་, Wylie: 'grams tshad, THL: dram tshe), excess heat in the lungs, kidneys, and intestines; reduce swelling; and is a component of the three reds (Tibetan: དམར་གསུམ་, Wylie: dmar gsum, THL: mar sum), a subcompound included in many Tibetan preparations in order to remove excess heat in the blood.

== Pharmacologic properties ==
The following properties were described in various cellular and animal models:

- urolithiasis
- immunomodulatory
