= Zenodochium sostra =

Scientific classification
- Domain: Eukaryota
- Kingdom: Animalia
- Phylum: Arthropoda
- Class: Insecta
- Order: Lepidoptera
- Family: Blastobasidae
- Genus: Zenodochium
- Species: Z. sostra

Binomial name
- Zenodochium sostra Walsingham, 1910

Synonyms
- Blastobasis sostra

Species of moth

Zenodochium sostra is a moth in the family Blastobasidae. It is found on the Canary Islands.

The wingspan is about 10 mm. The forewings are white with a faint shade of pale greyish fuscous dusting. The hindwings are shining white.
