= Rubia laurae =

Scientific classification
- Kingdom: Plantae
- Clade: Tracheophytes
- Clade: Angiosperms
- Clade: Eudicots
- Clade: Asterids
- Order: Gentianales
- Family: Rubiaceae
- Genus: Rubia
- Species: R. laurae

Binomial name
- Rubia laurae (Holmboe) Airy Shaw

Synonyms
- Galium laurae Holmboe

Species of plant

Rubia laurae, the Cyprus madder, is a trailing perennial with a woody rootstock, stems 10–100 cm long. Leaves 4-whorled, simple, irregularly serrulate, glaucous, coriaceous, sessile, with a broad asymmetrical base, 8–30 x 2–8 mm. Flowers in terminal cymes, small, yellow-brownish, with a 5-merous corolla. Flowers May–August. Fruit a black, globose, fleshy, drupe.

== Habitat ==
Rocky and stony, dry hillsides, in garigue, vineyard edges or pine forests at 0–1200 m altitude.

== Distribution ==
Endemic to Cyprus where it occur in Lysos, Panayia, Arminou, Mesa Potamos, Kato Amiandos, Platres area, the Limassol Forest, Erimi, the Pentadaktylos Range.
