= Zenodochium xylophagum =

Scientific classification
- Domain: Eukaryota
- Kingdom: Animalia
- Phylum: Arthropoda
- Class: Insecta
- Order: Lepidoptera
- Family: Blastobasidae
- Genus: Zenodochium
- Species: Z. xylophagum

Binomial name
- Zenodochium xylophagum Walsingham, 1908

Synonyms
- Blastobasis xylophagum

Species of moth

Zenodochium xylophagum is a moth in the family Blastobasidae. It is found in Spain.

The wingspan is 15–16 mm. The forewings are whitish cinereous (ash grey) densely irrorated (speckled) with mouse-grey. The hindwings are pale brassy brown.
