= Zenodochium monopetali =

Scientific classification
- Domain: Eukaryota
- Kingdom: Animalia
- Phylum: Arthropoda
- Class: Insecta
- Order: Lepidoptera
- Family: Blastobasidae
- Genus: Zenodochium
- Species: Z. monopetali

Binomial name
- Zenodochium monopetali Walsingham, 1908

Synonyms
- Blastobasis monopetali

Species of moth

Zenodochium monopetali is a moth in the family Blastobasidae. It is found in Spain.

The wingspan is 14–16 mm. The forewings are pale ochreous, dusted with brownish scales. The hindwings are shining pale greyish cinereous. The antennae, head, and thorax are pale ochreous, but the thorax has a brownish fuscous patch above. The abdomen is blackish, with pale ochreous bars. The legs are pale ochreous, shaded brownish on their outer sides.
