= Hokuto (apple) =

Variety of apple

Malus domestica
- Species: Malus domestica
- Hybrid parentage: Fuji × Mutsu
- Marketing names: Hokuto
- Origin: (Japan) Aomori Prefecture, 1983

The Hokuto apple (Japanese: 北斗) is a variety of apple that originated in Aomori, Japan. It was first introduced in 1983 as a cross between the Fuji and Mutsu varieties. The Hokuto apple is known for its large size and has even been recognized by the Guinness World Records as the world's heaviest apple. Besides its size, the Hokuto apple is known for its crisp texture and sweet flavor.

== History ==
The Hokuto apple was developed at the Aomori Apple Experiment Station in Japan in 1983. It was created by crossing the Fuji and Mutsu apple varieties, resulting in an apple that combined the crisp texture of the Fuji with the large size and round shape of the Mutsu, as well as the sweetness of both.

== Characteristics ==
The Hokuto apple is large and round, with a red color. Its flesh is pale yellow, crisp, and very sweet due to its high sugar content. The Hokuto apple is typically available in late October and is mainly used for fresh eating as a snack.

== Cultivation ==
The Hokuto apple is mainly grown in Japan. However, it is also grown in other countries.

== See also ==
- Akane (apple)
- Fuji (apple)
- Sekai Ichi
- Tsugaru (apple)
