= Akane =

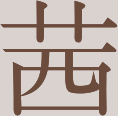
- Akane in Kanji meaning Madder Plant
- Pronunciation: ah-KAH-nay
- Gender: Female

Origin
- Origin: Japan
- Meaning: Different meanings depending on the kanji used.

Other names
- See also: Sumire; Tsubaki

Akane (あかね, アカネ) is the Japanese word for 'deep red' (茜, Akane, Rubia cordifolia) and is associated with red (from the red dye made from its roots) and brilliant red. Akane (written in a variety of forms) is both a female Japanese given name, ranked #9 of names to give girls in Japan, as well as a surname. In fiction, the name Akane has been used for various characters in anime, manga, games, books, and comics. Notable people with the name include:

== Given name ==
- Akane Araki (荒木 茜羽; born 1996), Japanese badminton player
- Akane Chihaya (千早 茜; born 1979), Japanese writer
- Akane Fujita (wrestler) (藤田 あかね; born 1987), Japanese professional wrestler
- Akane Fujita (藤田 茜; born 1993), Japanese voice actress
- Akane Hirose (廣瀬 茜), member of the Japanese rock band Band-Maid
- Akane Hosoyamada (細山田 茜; born 1992), Japanese ice hockey player
- Akane Hotta (堀田 茜; born 1992), Japanese actress, model and tarento
- Akane Konishi (小西 あかね; born 1995), Japanese ice hockey player
- Akane Kumada (熊田 茜音; born 2000), Japanese voice actress and singer
- Akane Kuroki (黒木 茜; born 1978), Japanese Olympic dressage rider
- Akane Matsunaga (松永 あかね; born 2001), Japanese voice actress
- Akane Moriya (守屋 茜), Japanese idol and model
- Akane Nakashima (中嶋 茜; born 1990), Japanese goalball player
- Akane Nishino (西野 朱音; born 2002), Japanese professional footballer
- Akane Ogura (小椋 アカネ), Japanese manga artist
- Akane Omae (大前 茜, born 1982), Japanese voice actress
- Akane Osawa (大沢 あかね), member of the Japanese pop music duet Tomboy
- Akane Saito (齊藤 あかね; born 1993), Japanese women's footballer
- Akane Sakanoue (坂ノ上 茜; born 1995), Japanese actress
- Akane Shibata (柴田 あかね), Japanese field hockey player
- Akane Shiga (志賀 紅音; born 2001), Japanese ice hockey player
- Akane Sugazaki (菅崎 茜, born 1989), Japanese pop singer and songwriter
- Akane Takada (高田 茜) Japanese ballet dancer
- Akane Takayanagi (高柳 明音), member of the Japanese girl idol group SKE48
- Akane Tomonaga (友永 朱音), Japanese voice actress
- Akane Watanabe (渡邉 あかね; born 1994), Japanese badminton player
- Akane Yamaguchi (山口 あかね), Japanese badminton player who competed in the 2012 Japan Super Series
- Akane Yanagisawa (柳澤 明希; born 1998), Japanese competitor in synchronized swimming
- Akane Yamao (山尾 朱子; born 1974), Japanese rhythmic gymnast
- Akane Yoshida (born 1994), Japanese weightlifter

== Surname ==
- Hotaru Akane (紅音 ほたる; born 1983), Japanese model and AV actress
- Kazuki Akane (赤根 和樹; born 1962), Japanese anime director

== Fictional characters ==
- Akane, the main heroine from the video game Akane the Kunoichi
- Akane, senior geisha in the Westworld series
- Akane (あかね), Hikaru's younger sister in Parodius
- Akane (アカネ), the fox and guardian angel from Angel Tales (Tenshi no Shippo)
- Akane (アカネ), the Japanese name of Whitney, a character in Pokémon
- Akane Aizawa (相沢 あかね), in Dai Sentai Goggle-V
- Akane Aoi (蒼井 茜), a male character in the manga and anime series Toilet-Bound Hanako-kun
- Akane Aki (秋 あかね), a character in the manga series Dash Kappei
- Akane Asahina (朝比奈 あかね), a classmate from the series Kanokon
- Akane Fujita (藤田 アカネ), Takoyaki shop owner from the series Pretty Cure (2004 TV series)
- Akane Higurashi (日暮 あかね) from the anime and manga series My-HiME
- Akane Hino (日野 あかね), one of the main characters of the series Smile PreCure!
- Akane Hino (日野 茜), a character in the 2011 mobile game The Idolmaster Cinderella Girls
- Akane Hououji (鳳凰寺 紅葉), a character in the manga series The Café Terrace and Its Goddesses
- Akane Houzuki (宝月 茜) (Ema Skye), a character in the Ace Attorney franchise
- Akane Inuwaka (犬若 あかね), a character in the video game series Arcana Heart
- Akane Isshiki (一色 あかね), a main character in the anime series Vividred Operation
- Akane Kimidori (木緑 あかね), in manga and anime series Dr. Slump
- Akane Kino (木野 茜), the younger sister of the main character in the manga series Voice Over! Seiyu Academy
- Akane Kiryu (桐生 茜) of Fatal Frame II
- Akane Kishida (岸田 茜) from Kitchen Princess
- Akane Kobayashi (小林 あかね), a character in Doki Doki School Hours
- Akane Kurashiki (倉式 茜), a major character from the video game series Zero Escape
- Akane Kurokawa (黒川 あかね), a character in the manga and anime series Oshi no Ko
- Akane Mishima (美嶋 紅音), one of the main characters of Kampfer
- Akane Mizuhara (水原 明鐘), a main character in the visual novel Final Approach
- Akane Motomiya (元宮 あかね), a main character in the video game, anime and manga series Haruka: Beyond the Stream of Time
- Akane Nakiko, a comic book character from Witchblade
- Akane Narita (成田 茜), in Hot Gimmick
- Akane Nishino (西野 アカネ), a major character in the light novel series The Eminence in Shadow
- Akane Nonohara (野々原 茜), a character from The Idolmaster Million Live!
- Akane Osaki (桜咲 朱音), the main character of the manga series Akane-banashi
- Akane Owari (終里 赤音), a character from the Danganronpa series
- Akane Ryuuku, a roleplay character of Gumball Watterson from The Amazing World of Gumball
- Akane Ryuzoji (龍造寺 朱音), a character in the manga series World's End Harem
- Akane Sakurada (櫻田 茜), the main character of the anime and manga series Castle Town Dandelion
- Akane Sano (佐野 茜), a main character in the manga series Black God
- Akane Satomura (里村 茜), a main character in the visual novel One: Kagayaku Kisetsu e
- Akane Sawatari (沢渡 アカネ), a character in the Chainsaw Man anime and manga series
- Akane Serizawa (芹沢 茜), a minor character in the anime and manga series Pani Poni
- Akane Shinjō (新条 アカネ), a character in the anime series SSSS.Gridman
- Akane Shinome (篠目 アカネ), a character in the anime series Little Battlers Experience WARS
- Akane Soir (アカネ・ソワール, Akane Sowāru), a character in the anime and manga series My-Otome
- Akane Sonozaki (園崎 茜), in the anime, manga, and visual novel series Higurashi When They Cry
- Akane Suzumiya (涼宮 茜), a character in Kimi ga Nozomu Eien and Akane Maniax
- Akane Takigawa (滝川 あかね), in the manga and anime series Cross Game
- Akane Tachibana (立花 茜), lead character in basketball manga series I'll
- Akane Tendo (天道 あかね), in manga and anime series Ranma ½
- Akane Toriyasu, a character in the video game Yandere Simulator
- Akane Tsunemori (常守 朱), a character in the anime Psycho-Pass
- Akane "Jubei" Yagyu (柳生 茜), from the video game, Onimusha: Dawn of Dreams
- Akane Yamano (山野 茜), a character in Dual!
- Akane Yamamoto (山本 茜), a character in the manga series Haikyū!!
- Akane Yanagi (柳 明音), a male character in the manga and anime series Hori-san to Miyamura-kun
- Akane Yashiro (家城 茜), a character in the film Godzilla Against Mechagodzilla
- Lady Akane, a concubine in the Tales of the Otori
