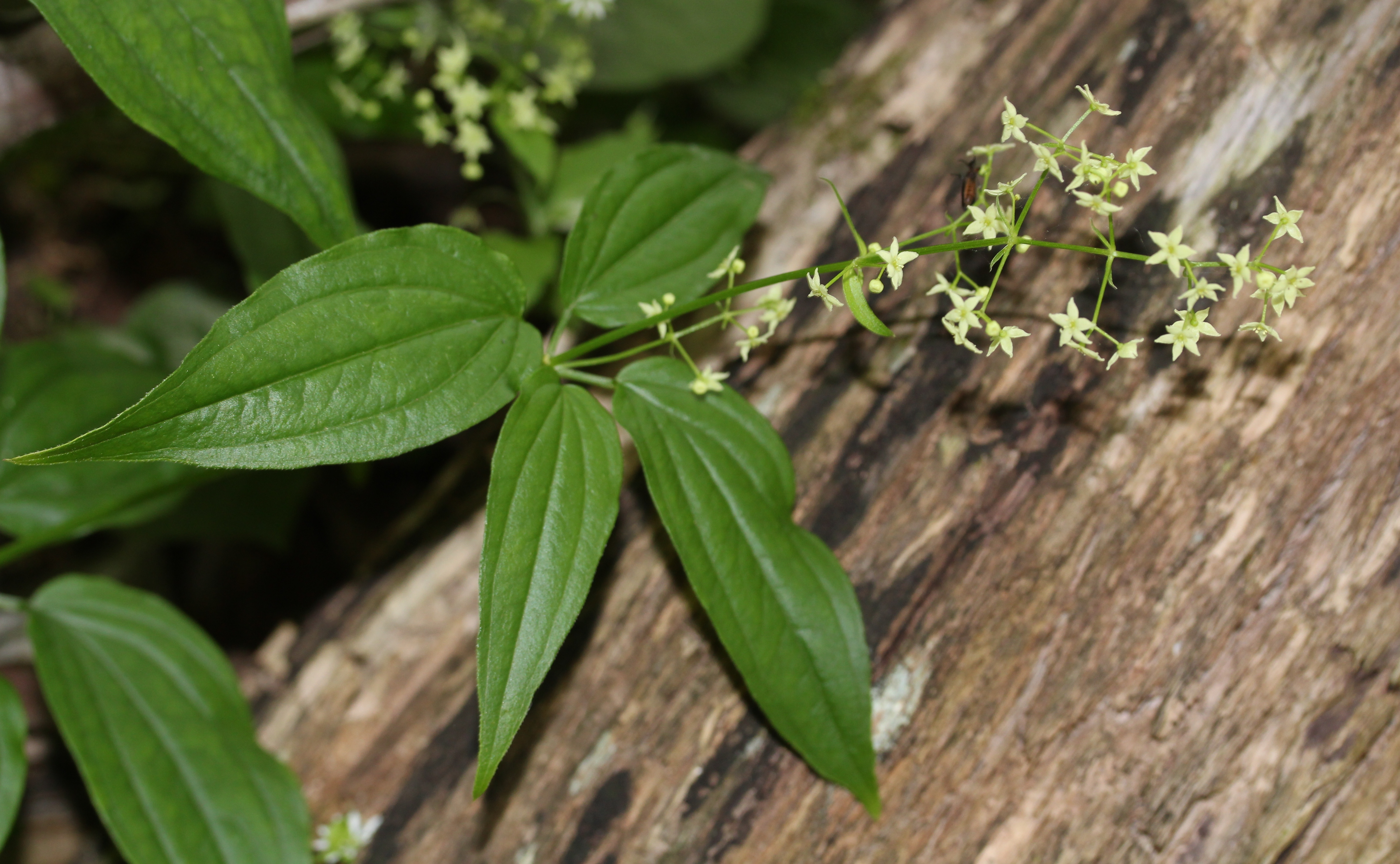
- Rubia chinensis in Japan

Scientific classification
- Kingdom: Plantae
- Clade: Tracheophytes
- Clade: Angiosperms
- Clade: Eudicots
- Clade: Asterids
- Order: Gentianales
- Family: Rubiaceae
- Genus: Rubia
- Species: R. chinensis

Binomial name
- Rubia chinensis Regel & Maack

= Rubia chinensis =

Species of plant

Rubia chinensis is a species of flowering plants belonging to the family Rubiaceae.

It is native to Southern Russian Far East.
