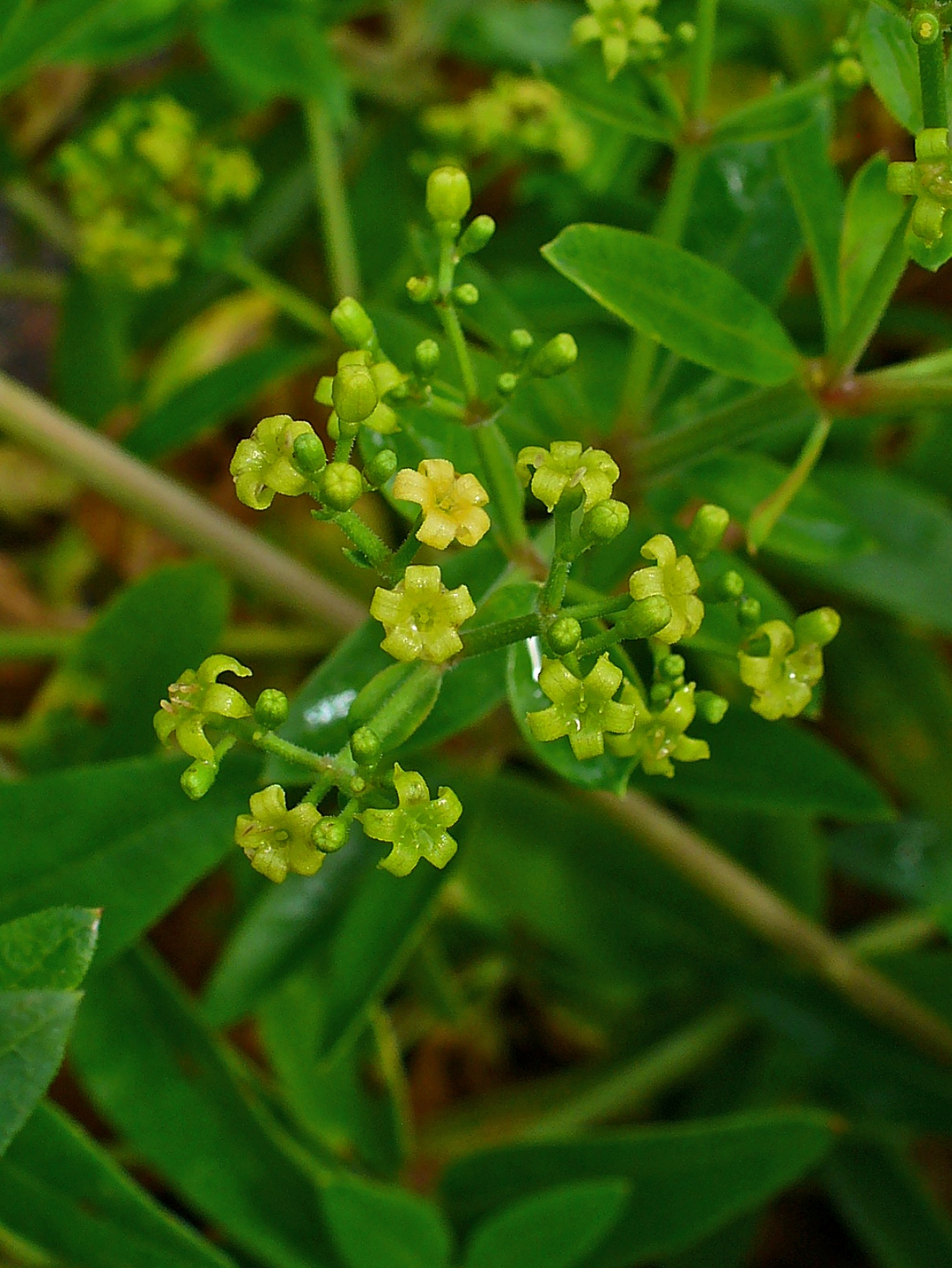
- Rubia tinctorum

Scientific classification
- Kingdom: Plantae
- Clade: Tracheophytes
- Clade: Angiosperms
- Clade: Eudicots
- Clade: Asterids
- Order: Gentianales
- Family: Rubiaceae
- Subfamily: Rubioideae
- Tribe: Rubieae
- Genus: Rubia; L.

Type species
- Rubia tinctorum L.

= Rubia =

Genus of flowering plants in the coffee family

Rubia is the type genus of the Rubiaceae family of flowering plants, which also contains Coffea (coffee). It contains around 80 species of perennial scrambling or climbing herbs and subshrubs native to the Old World.

The genus and its best-known species are commonly known as madder, e.g. Rubia tinctorum (common madder), Rubia peregrina (wild madder), and Rubia cordifolia (Indian madder).

== Uses ==
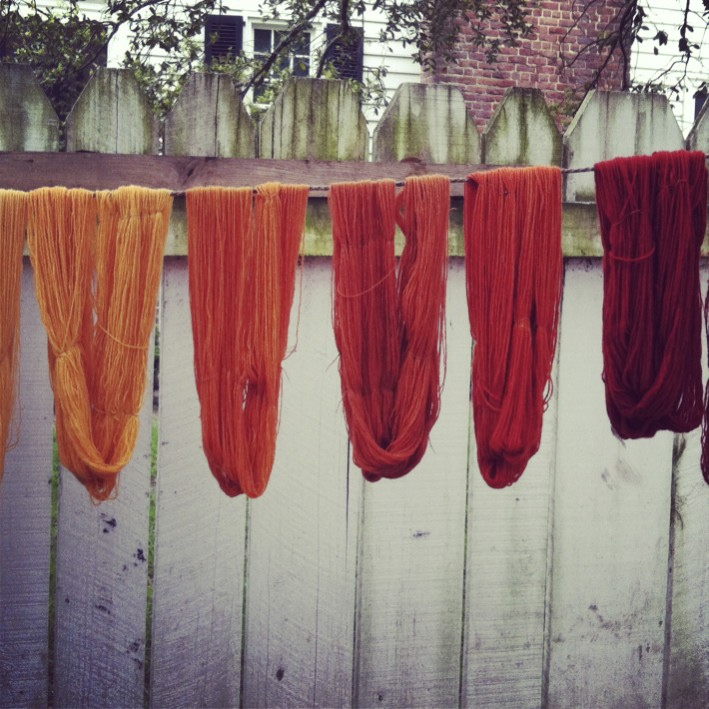
Skeins of yarn dyed with madder root, Rubia tinctorum

Rubia was an economically important source of a red pigment in many regions of Asia, Europe and Africa. The genus name Rubia derives from the Latin ruber meaning "red".

The plant's roots contain an anthracene compound called alizarin that gives its red colour to a textile dye known as Rose madder. It was also used as a colourant, especially for paint, that is referred to as Madder lake. The synthesis of alizarin greatly reduced demand for the natural compound.

In Georgia and Armenia, Rubia is used for dying Easter eggs red.

== History ==
Several species, such as Rubia tinctorum in Europe, Rubia cordifolia in India, and Rubia argyi in East Asia, were extensively cultivated from antiquity until the mid nineteenth century for red dye, commonly called madder. Cloth dyed with it has been found on Egyptian mummies. It was the ereuthedanon (ἐρευθέδανον) used for dyeing the cloaks of the Libyan women in the days of Herodotus. It is the erythrodanon (ἐρυθρόδανον) of Pedanius Dioscorides, who wrote of its cultivation in Caria, and of Hippocrates, and the Rubia of Pliny. R. tinctorum was extensively cultivated in south Europe, France, where it is called garance, and the Netherlands, and to a small extent in the United States. Large quantities were imported into England from Smyrna, Trieste, Livorno, etc. The cultivation, however, decreased after alizarin was made artificially.

Madder was employed medicinally in ancient civilizations and in the Middle Ages. In his Natural History, Pliny described it as a diuretic and is capable of treating jaundice and lichen planus. John Gerard, in 1597, wrote of it as having been cultivated in many gardens in his day, and describes its many supposed virtues, but any pharmacological or therapeutic action which madder may possess is unrecognizable. Its most remarkable physiological effect was found to be that of colouring red the bones of animals fed upon it, as also the claws and beaks of birds. This appears to be due to the chemical affinity of calcium phosphate for the colouring matter. This property was used to enable physiologists to ascertain the manner in which bones develop, and the functions of the various types of cell found in growing bone.

== Species ==
- Rubia agostinhoi Dans. & P.Silva
- Rubia aitchisonii Deb & Malick
- Rubia alaica Pachom.
- Rubia alata Wall.
- Rubia albicaulis Boiss.
- Rubia angustisissima Wall. ex G.Don
- Rubia argyi (H.Lév. & Vaniot) Hara ex Lauener
- Rubia atropurpurea Decne.
- Rubia balearica (Willk.) Porta
- Rubia caramanica Bornm.
- Rubia charifolia Wall. ex G.Don
- Rubia chinensis Regel & Maack
- Rubia chitralensis Ehrend.
- Rubia clematidifolia Blume ex Decne.
- Rubia cordifolia L.
- Rubia crassipes Collett & Hemsl.
- Rubia cretacea Pojark.
- Rubia danaensis Danin
- Rubia davisiana Ehrend.
- Rubia deserticola Pojark.
- Rubia discolor Turcz.
- Rubia dolichophylla Schrenk
- Rubia edgeworthii Hook.f.
- Rubia falciformis H.S.Lo
- Rubia filiformis F.C.How ex H.S.Lo
- Rubia florida Boiss.
- Rubia fruticosa Aiton
- Rubia garrettii Craib
- Rubia gedrosiaca Bornm.
- Rubia haematantha Ary Shaw
- Rubia hexaphylla (Makino) Makino
- Rubia himalayensis Klotzsch
- Rubia hispidicaulis D.G.Long
- Rubia horrida (Thunb.) Puff
- Rubia infundibularis Hemsl. & Lace
- Rubia jesoensis (Miq.) Miyabe & Kudo
- Rubia komarovii Pojark.
- Rubia krascheninnikovii Pojark.
- Rubia laevissima Tschern.
- Rubia latipetala H.S.Lo
- Rubia laurae (Holmboe) Airy Shaw
- Rubia laxiflora Gontsch.
- Rubia linii J.M.Chao
- Rubia magna P.G.Xiao
- Rubia mandersii Collett & Hemsl.
- Rubia manjith Roxb. ex Fleming
- Rubia maymanensis Ehrend. & Schönb.-Tem.
- Rubia membranacea Diels
- Rubia oncotricha Hand.-Mazz.
- Rubia oppositifolia Griff.
- Rubia ovatifolia Z.Ying Zhang ex Q.Lin
- Rubia pallida Diels
- Rubia pauciflora Boiss.
- Rubia pavlovii Bajtenov & Myrz.
- Rubia peregrina L.
- Rubia petiolaris DC.
- Rubia philippinensis Elmer
- Rubia podantha Diels
- Rubia polyphlebia H.S.Lo
- Rubia pterygocaulis H.S.Lo
- Rubia rechingeri Ehrend.
- Rubia regelii Pojark.
- Rubia rezniczenkoana Litv.
- Rubia rigidifolia Pojark.
- Rubia rotundifolia Banks & Sol.
- Rubia salicifolia H.S.Lo
- Rubia schugnanica B.Fedtsch. ex Pojark.
- Rubia schumanniana E.Pritz.
- Rubia siamensis Craib
- Rubia sikkimensis Kurz
- Rubia sylvatica (Maxim.) Nakai
- Rubia tatarica (Trevir.) F.Schmidt
- Rubia tenuifolia d'Urv.
- Rubia tenuissima ined.
- Rubia thunbergii DC.
- Rubia tibetica Hook.f.
- Rubia tinctorum L.
- Rubia transcaucasica Grossh.
- Rubia trichocarpa H.S.Lo
- Rubia truppeliana Loes.
- Rubia wallichiana Decne.
- Rubia yunnanensis Diels
