= Tsubaki =

Tsubaki (つばき or ツバキ) may refer to:

== People ==
- Tsubaki Miki (三木 つばき; born 2003), Japanese snowboarder
- Tsubaki Nekoi (猫井 椿; born 1969), the pen name used by a member of the all-female manga-creating team Clamp
- Andrew T. Tsubaki (1931–2009), Japanese theatre scholar
- Ayako Tsubaki (椿 文子; born 1969), Japanese speed skater
- Ayana Tsubaki (椿姫 彩菜; born 1984), a Japanese transgender TV personality
- Tsubaki Chinzan (椿 椿山; 1801–1854), Japanese painter
- Hiroshi Tsubaki (born 1991), Japanese former professional cyclist
- Izumi Tsubaki (椿 いづみ), a Japanese manga artist
- Naoki Tsubaki (椿 直起; born 2000), Japanese footballer
- Risa Tsubaki (椿 理沙; born 1979), Japanese voice actress
- Takayuki Tsubaki (椿 隆之; born 1982), a Japanese actor known for playing Kazuma Kenzaki in the Japanese tokusatsu television series Kamen Rider Blade

== Fictional characters ==
=== Given name ===
- Tsubaki Domyoji, from Boys Over Flowers
- Tsubaki Kakyouin or "Tsubaki-hime", a character from Descendants of Darkness
- Tsubaki Nakatsukasa, from Soul Eater (manga)
- Tsubaki Oribe, from Please Twins!
- Tsubaki Yayoi, from BlazBlue
- Tsubaki Tokisaka, minor character of The SoulTaker miniseries
- Tsubaki Sawabe, a main character in Your Lie in April
- Tsubaki, an antagonist character of the 2011 manga and 2016 anime Servamp
- Tsubaki, one of the main characters of In the Heart of Kunoichi Tsubaki

=== Surname ===
- Akira Tsubaki, a character from Mysterious Girlfriend X
- Issei Tsubaki, a character from Full Metal Panic!
- Sadamitsu Tsubaki, the main character of Sadamitsu the Destroyer
- Sasuke Tsubaki, a character from Sket Dance
- Tsubaki, a character from the hentai anime MeiKing (part of the Vanilla Series)
- Sanjūrō Tsubaki, a character from the film Sanjuro

== Other uses ==
- Tsubaki (band), a Japanese rock (J-rock) trio
- Tsubaki Grand Shrine, a Shinto shrine in Suzuka, Japan, which is the principal shrine of the deity Sarutahiko-no-Ōkami
- Tsubaki Grand Shrine of America, the first Shinto shrine built in the mainland United States after World War II
- Camellia japonica or tsubaki, a species of flowering plants
- Japanese destroyer Tsubaki
- Tsubakimoto Chain, brand name "Tsubaki", a manufacturer of industrial drive chains, and other power transmission products
- Goto Tsubaki Airport, the airport of Fukue in the Goto Islands of far western Japan
