= Mutsu (apple) =

Apple cultivar

Malus domestica 'Mutsu'
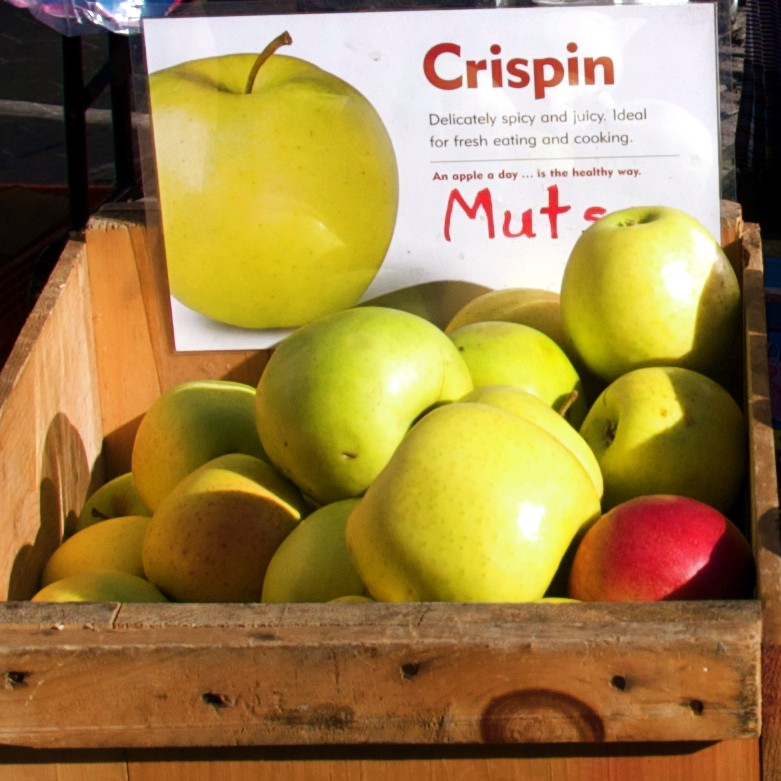
- Hybrid parentage: 'Golden Delicious' × 'Indo'
- Cultivar: 'Mutsu'
- Origin: (Japan) Aomori Prefecture, 1949

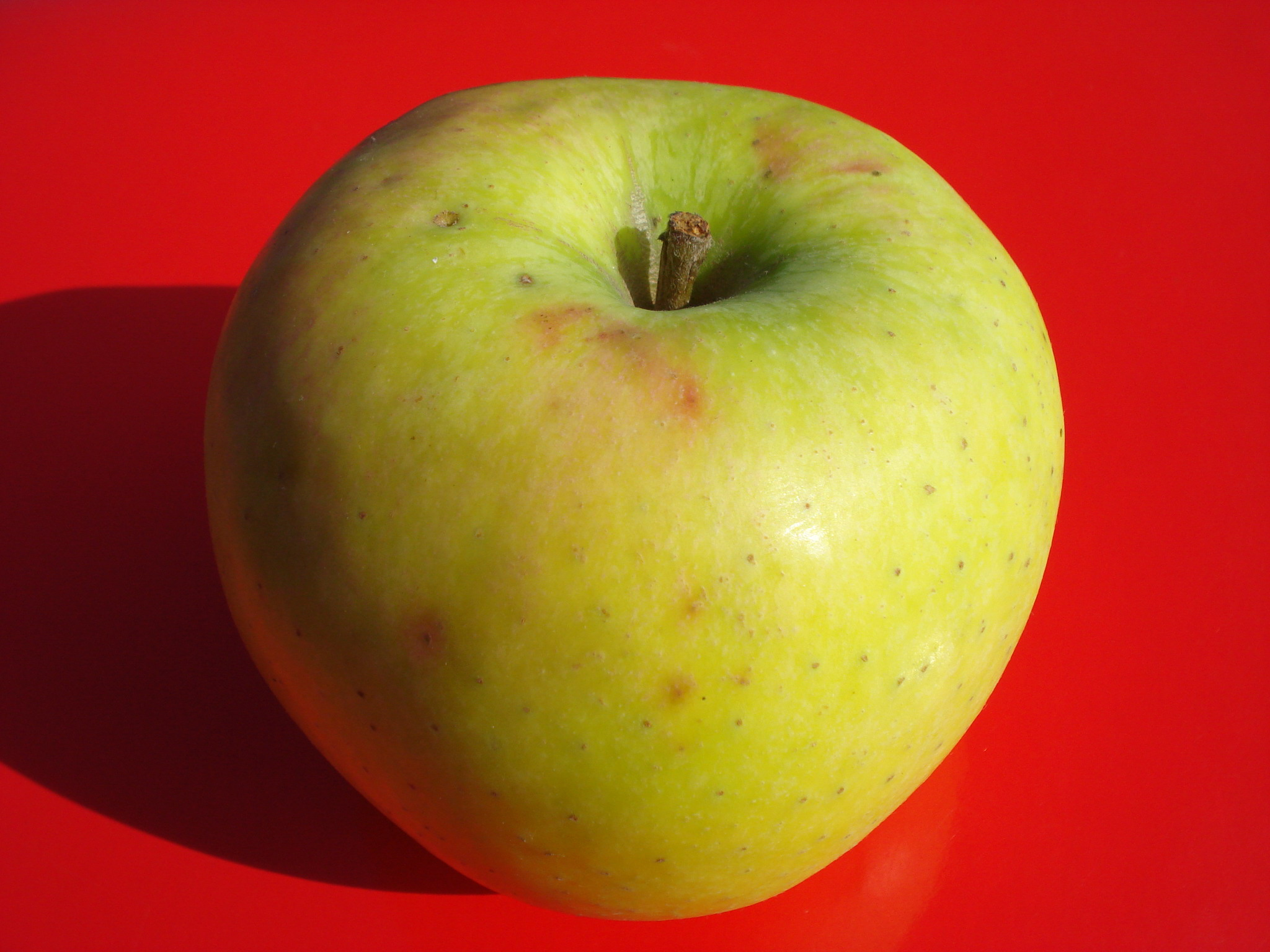
A Mutsu apple grown in Croatia

The Mutsu (陸奥, ムツ) apple (also known as Crispin) was introduced in 1949 and is a cross between the 'Golden Delicious' and the 'Indo' apple cultivars first grown in Aomori Prefecture, Japan. The apple's name is the former name of a large section of the Tōhoku region, Mutsu Province, which Aomori was created from during the Meiji Restoration.

'Mutsu' is a triploid cultivar. It is highly susceptible to the disease Blister Spot.

'Mutsu' is a medium to large green apple with flesh varying in color from white to greenish yellow. It can be round, conical, or oblong, and have unequal sides. It is generally not uniform in shape or size. The russeting on a 'Mutsu' apple covers little to none of the skin and when it is present is light gray to brown.

== Usage ==
'Mutsu' is aromatic, sweet, and sharp, with juicy flesh. It is suitable for eating on its own, juicing, drying, or cooking, as it maintains its shape well when cooked. It can be kept for up to three months before going bad.

== Cultivation ==
'Mutsu' can be grown in temperate or warm climates. It flowers in the middle of the growing season and is harvested late in the season. It is self-sterile and poor at pollinating others. It tends to bear fruit biennially.
