= Sansa apple =

Apple cultivar

Sansa
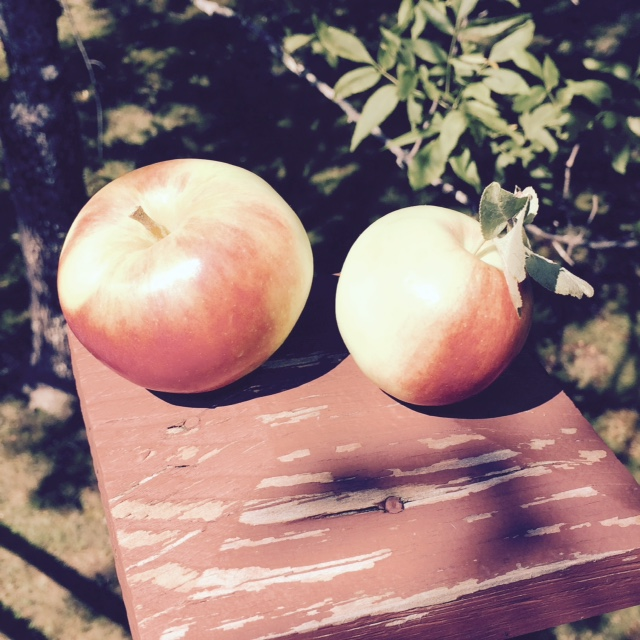
- In a Connecticut orchard 2016
- Species: Malus domestica
- Hybrid parentage: Cross of the Japanese Akane and New Zealand Gala
- Cultivar: 'Sansa'

The Sansa apple is a red apple with yellow streaks, first released commercially in 1988. They ripen early in New England, starting in August, and by autumn they are no longer available.
