= Japanese destroyer Tsubaki =

Two Japanese destroyers have been named Tsubaki:

- Japanese destroyer Tsubaki (1918), an Enoki-class destroyer launched in 1918 she was stricken in 1935
- Japanese destroyer Tsubaki (1944), a Matsu-class destroyer launched in 1944 and scrapped in 1948
