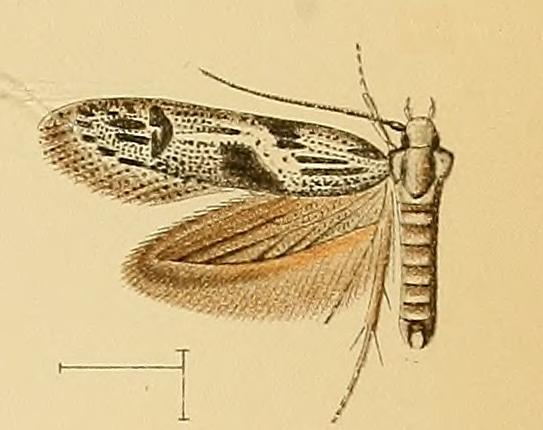
- Zenodochium polyohagum

Scientific classification
- Domain: Eukaryota
- Kingdom: Animalia
- Phylum: Arthropoda
- Class: Insecta
- Order: Lepidoptera
- Family: Blastobasidae
- Tribe: Blastobasini
- Genus: Zenodochium; Walsingham, 1908

Synonyms
- Xenodochium T. B. Fletcher, 1929

= Zenodochium =

Moth genus in family Blastobasidae

Zenodochium is a genus of moths in the family Blastodacnidae described by Lord Walsingham in 1908.

== Species ==
- Zenodochium monopetali Walsingham, 1908
- Zenodochium polyphagum Walsingham, 1908
- Zenodochium sostra Walsingham, 1910
- Zenodochium xylophagum Walsingham, 1908
