= Sekai Ichi =

Apple cultivar

Sekai ichi
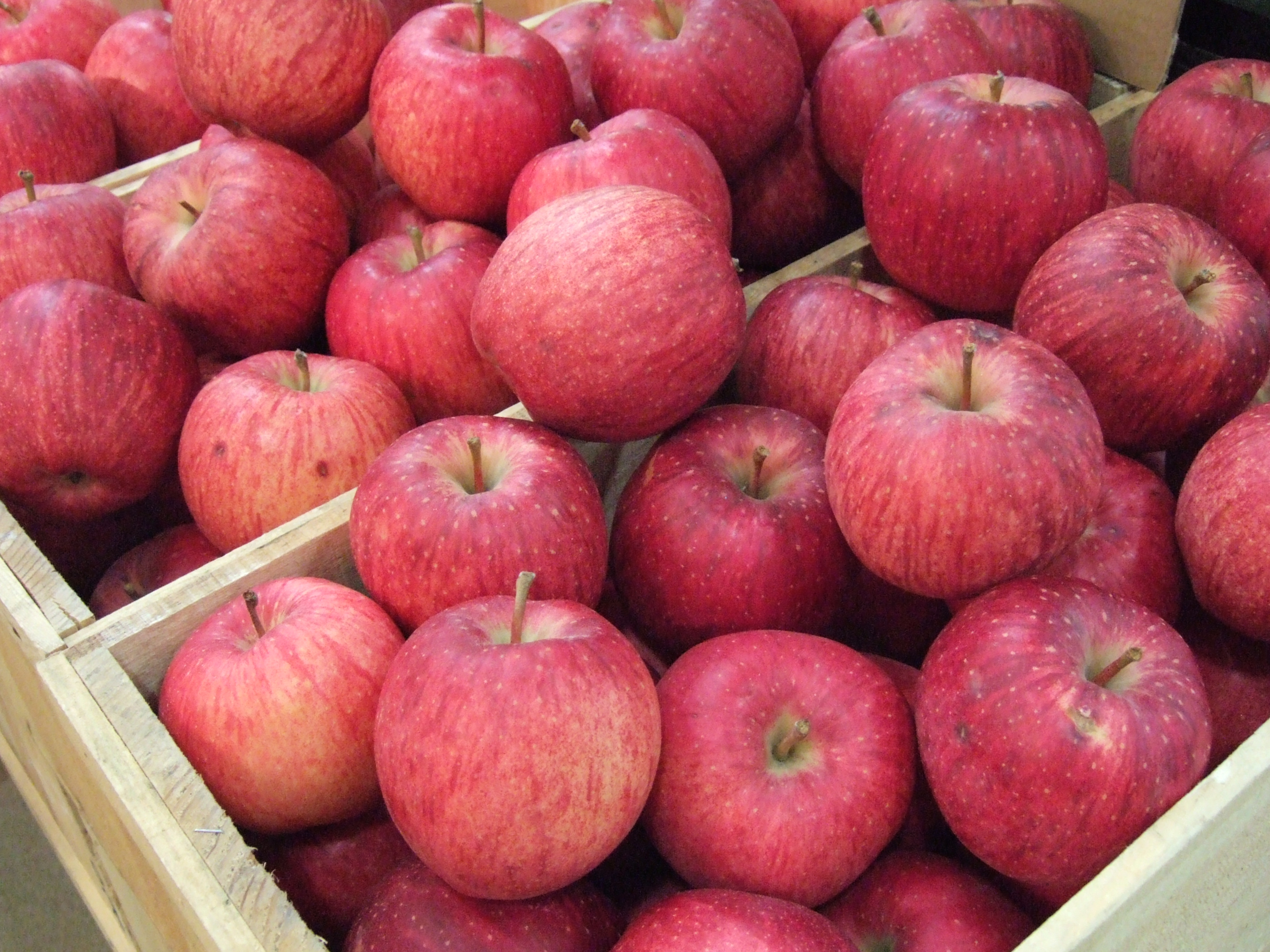
- Species: Malus domestica
- Hybrid parentage: Red Delicious × Golden Delicious (suspected)
- Cultivar: Aori No.4
- Marketing names: Sekai Ichi (World's Number One)
- Origin: (Japan) Morioka, 1930

Sekai ichi (Japanese: 世界一) is a cultivated variety or cultivar of apples from Japan. It was first planted in Morioka in 1930 and released to market in 1974. It is one of the largest varieties of apples, with an average circumference of 30 to 46 centimetres (12 to 18 in) and weight of 900 grams (2 lb 0 oz). Sekai ichi means "world's number one" in Japanese.

== Description ==
Sekai Ichi apples are pale pink/red with red stripes; they are juicy, sweet, and not as crisp or crunchy as other cultivars. They are low in acid and mild in taste. The variety came from a cross between the Red Delicious and Golden Delicious varieties.

== Cultivation and consumption ==
The Sekai Ichi is not just a premium apple variety but is one of the most expensive in the world due to the complex techniques and stringent requirements for cultivation. It is mostly grown in the Aomori Prefecture of Japan, and is exported to Asian countries, notably China and Singapore. It is also grown at a small number of farms in the United States, though not under the same strict conditions.

In Asia, it is used as a lavish gift on special occasions, such as major business transactions. At certain five-star hotels in Shanghai and Hong Kong, it is available as a luxurious fruit.

== See also ==
- Hokuto, another large variety
- Fuji, a premium variety
