= António Rodrigo Pinto da Silva =

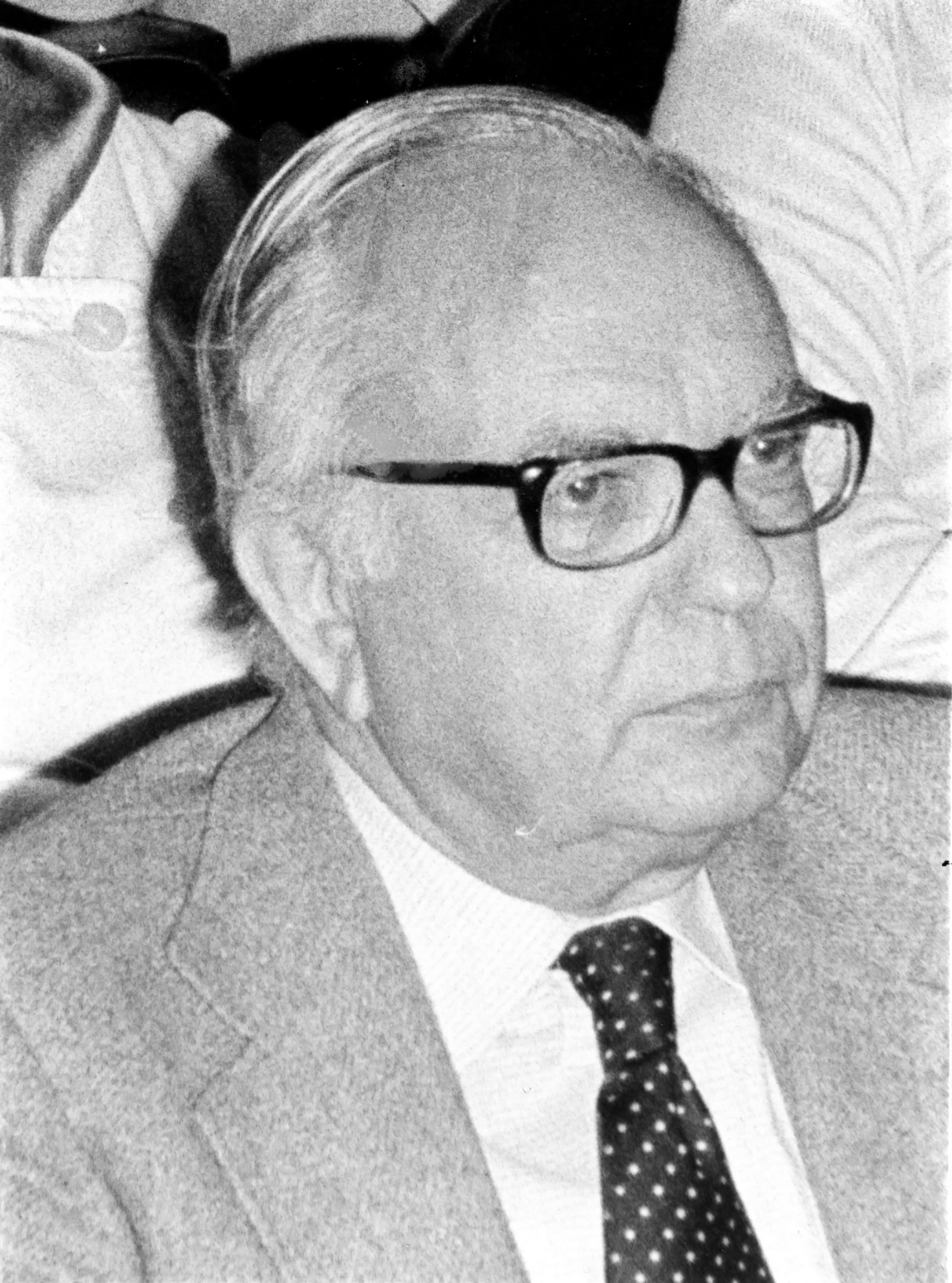
António Rodrigo Pinto da Silva (c. 1980).

António Rodrigo Pinto da Silva (Porto, 13 March 1912 – Lisbon, 28 September 1992), often referred to as A.R. Pinto da Silva or P. Silva, was a Portuguese botanist who distinguished himself as a taxonomist and phytosociologist when he collaborated with Swiss botanist Josias Braun-Blanquet and also with Pierre Dansereau.

His studies on taxonomy and floristic yielded a substantial number of new taxa and a better knowledge about many plants and its nomenclature. He organized the Estação Agronómica Nacional's (National Agronomic Station) herbarium, which he rose from 3000 to almost 100,000 entries. He was a pioneer on ethnobotany studies in Portugal and published several contributions on vernacular nomenclature of Portuguese flora, cultivated plants and popular use of wild plants as food. For half a century he helped archaeologists, having published numerous works on paleoethnobotany, among more than 300 articles, notes and communications published throughout his life both in Portuguese and foreign publications.

== Biography ==
A. R. Pinto da Silva was born in 1912 in the parish of Cedofeita at Porto. He graduated in agricultural engineering at Instituto Superior de Agronomia, Technical University of Lisbon in 1937. Married to biologist Quitéria of Jesus Gonçalves Pinto da Silva, they established in Lisbon. In 1968 he became principal investigator at the National Agronomic Station, where he worked from 1937 to 1982, year of his retirement. Since its founding in 1939, he became head of the Phytosystematics and Geobotany departments, devoting himself to studies of flora and vegetation of mainland Portugal and also in the Azores. Besides the results of his activities, he sought to stimulate others in these and other fields of research, with considerable results.

== Studies in taxonomy, floristics and ethnobotany ==
His studies in taxonomy and floristics yielded a substantial number of new taxa, among which stand out the Silene rothmaleri Pinto da Silva, Convolvulus fernandesii Pinto da Silva & Teles and Digitalis heywoodii (Pinto da Silva & M. Silva), including new taxa for the flora of Portugal and the Azores and a better knowledge of the area of many plants and their nomenclature. Since 1958, despite the shortage of staff, he assembled a Phytochorion Atlas covering more than half the area of Portugal. He organized the herbarium of the National Agronomic Station, which under his action went from just over 3,000 to almost 100,000 entries. He also developed complementary collections (diaspore in Portuguese flora, paleoethnobotany, etc.) and miscellaneous files. He edited the Index Seminum and organized the service of exchange and registration of seeds of that station from 1939 to 1982. First with the help of the principal investigator eng. AN Telles, then as a member of the Technical Council of the League for the Protection of Nature, of which he was one of the founders, established the first lists of Portuguese botanical areas to protect. Regarding the vegetation, he began systematic studies of phytosociology in Portugal with the collaboration of the Swiss botanist Josias Braun-Blanquet, having studied various plant communities and associations as oak forest, rivers, woods, Quercus coccifera forests, dunes, salty, vegetation, limestone soils and ultramafic rocks, vineyards, meadows, pastures.

In addition to the floristic and taxonomic research and phytosociology, he devoted to the naming of cultivated plants and botany nomenclature, having submitted numerous proposals for amendments to the International Code of Botanical Nomenclature and intervening in the discussion and vote during the sessions of Nomenclature of the International Botanical Congress of Stockholm - where he represented the National Agricultural Station and the Botanical Institutes of Coimbra and Porto - and Paris, representing the National Agricultural Station. In that Congress was appointed to the Committee for Spermatophyta of which was part from 1950 to 1969 and who presided until requested excuse.

== Dedicated taxa ==
Several taxon were dedicated to A.R. Pinto da Silva:

- Statice × pinto-silvae Rothm. (1940)
- Anabaena pintoi Guerrero (1951)
- Taraxacum pinto-silvae van Soest (1956)
- Coniothyrium pinto-silvae Sousa Dias & Silva Teixeira (1958)
- Hieracium pintodasilvae De Retz (1974)
- Alyssum pintodasilvae Dudley (1986)

== Memberships ==
- Botanical Society of the British Isles
- International Association for Plant Taxonomy
- Organization for the Phyto-Taxonomic Investigation of the Mediterranean Area
- Hunt Institute for Botanical Documentation
- Sociedade Broteriana
- Sociedade Portuguesa de Ciências Naturais
- Liga para a Protecção da Natureza
- Quercus
- Academia das Ciências de Lisboa
