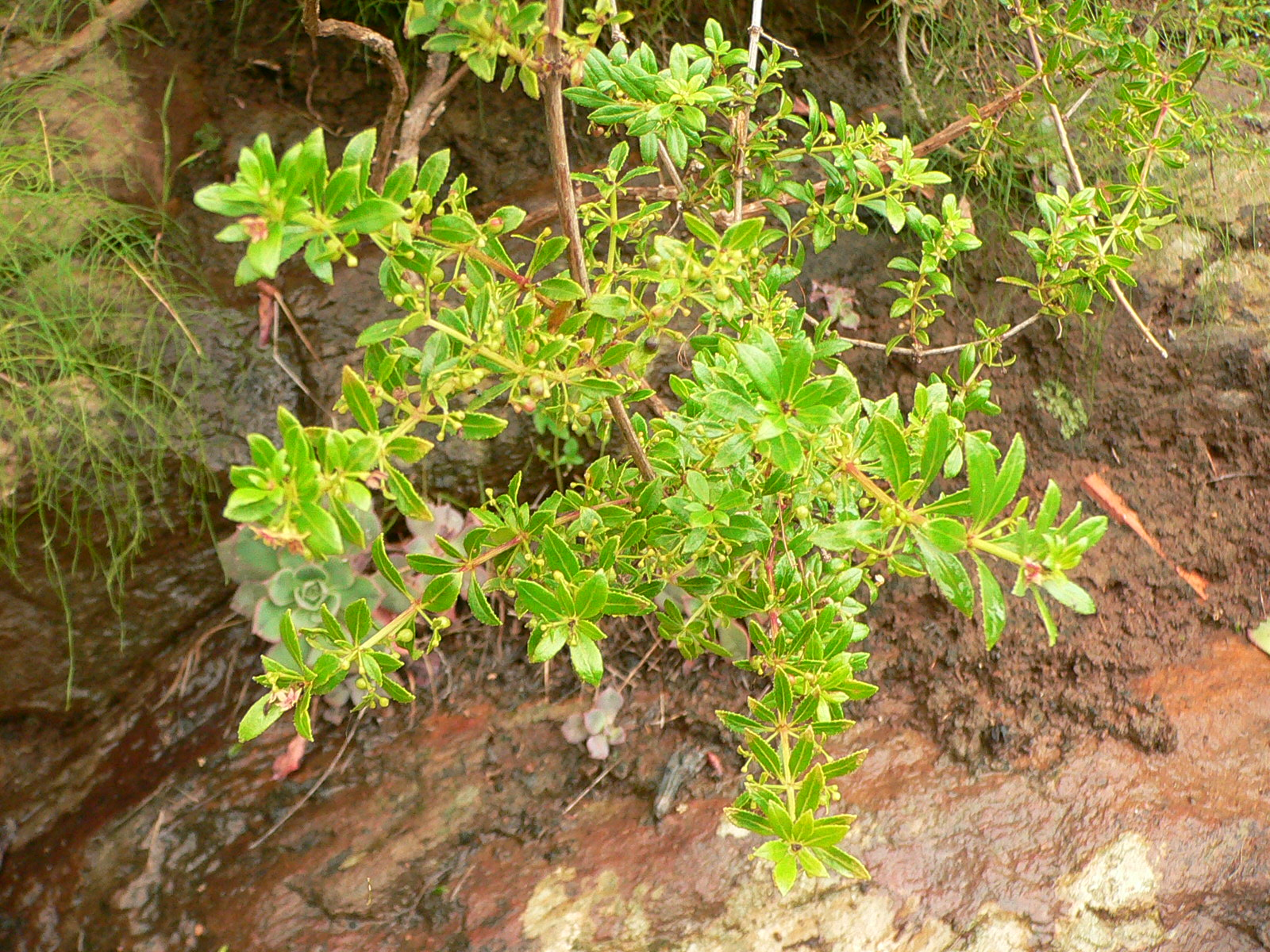

Scientific classification
- Kingdom: Plantae
- Clade: Tracheophytes
- Clade: Angiosperms
- Clade: Eudicots
- Clade: Asterids
- Order: Gentianales
- Family: Rubiaceae
- Genus: Rubia
- Species: R. fruticosa

Binomial name
- Rubia fruticosa Aiton

= Rubia fruticosa =

Species of plant

Rubia fruticosa is a species of flowering plant in the family Rubiaceae, native to the Canary Islands, Madeira and the Savage Islands.
