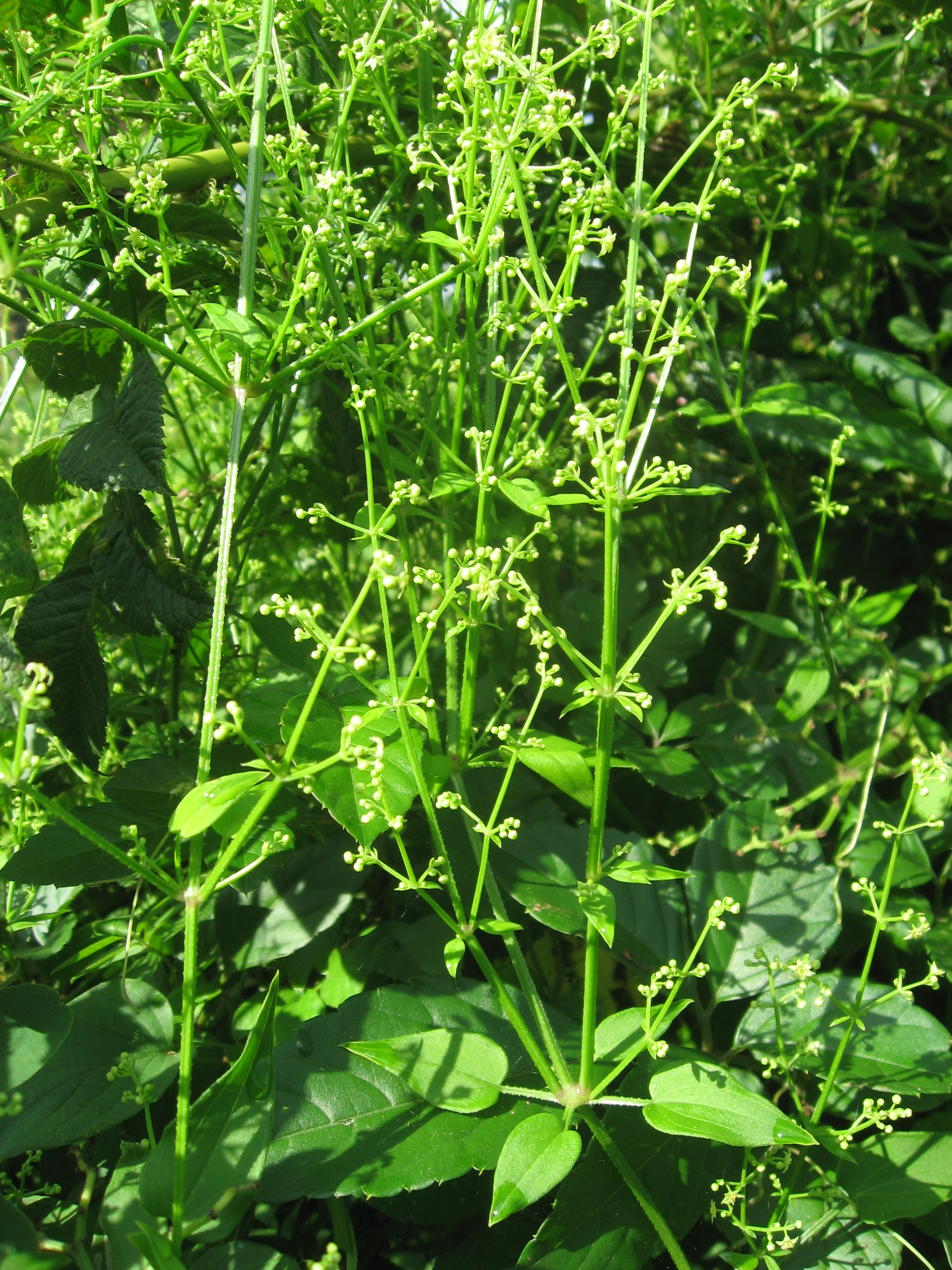
- In Japan

Scientific classification
- Kingdom: Plantae
- Clade: Embryophytes
- Clade: Tracheophytes
- Clade: Angiosperms
- Clade: Eudicots
- Clade: Asterids
- Order: Gentianales
- Family: Rubiaceae
- Genus: Rubia
- Species: R. argyi

Binomial name
- Rubia argyi (H.Lév. & Vaniot) H.Hara

Synonyms
- Galium argyi H.Lév. & Vaniot; Rubia chekiangensis Deb; Rubia akane Nakai; Rubia nankotaizana Masam.

= Rubia argyi =

Species of plant

Rubia argyi is a species of flowering plant of the family Rubiaceae. Its common names may include East Asian madder. It occurs in southern and eastern China, Taiwan, Japan, and Korea.

Rubia argyi is a herbaceous, perennial vine. The stem can grow to a length of 2 m (6 ft 7 in) or more.
