= Indo (apple) =

Apple cultivar

Malus domestica 'Indo'
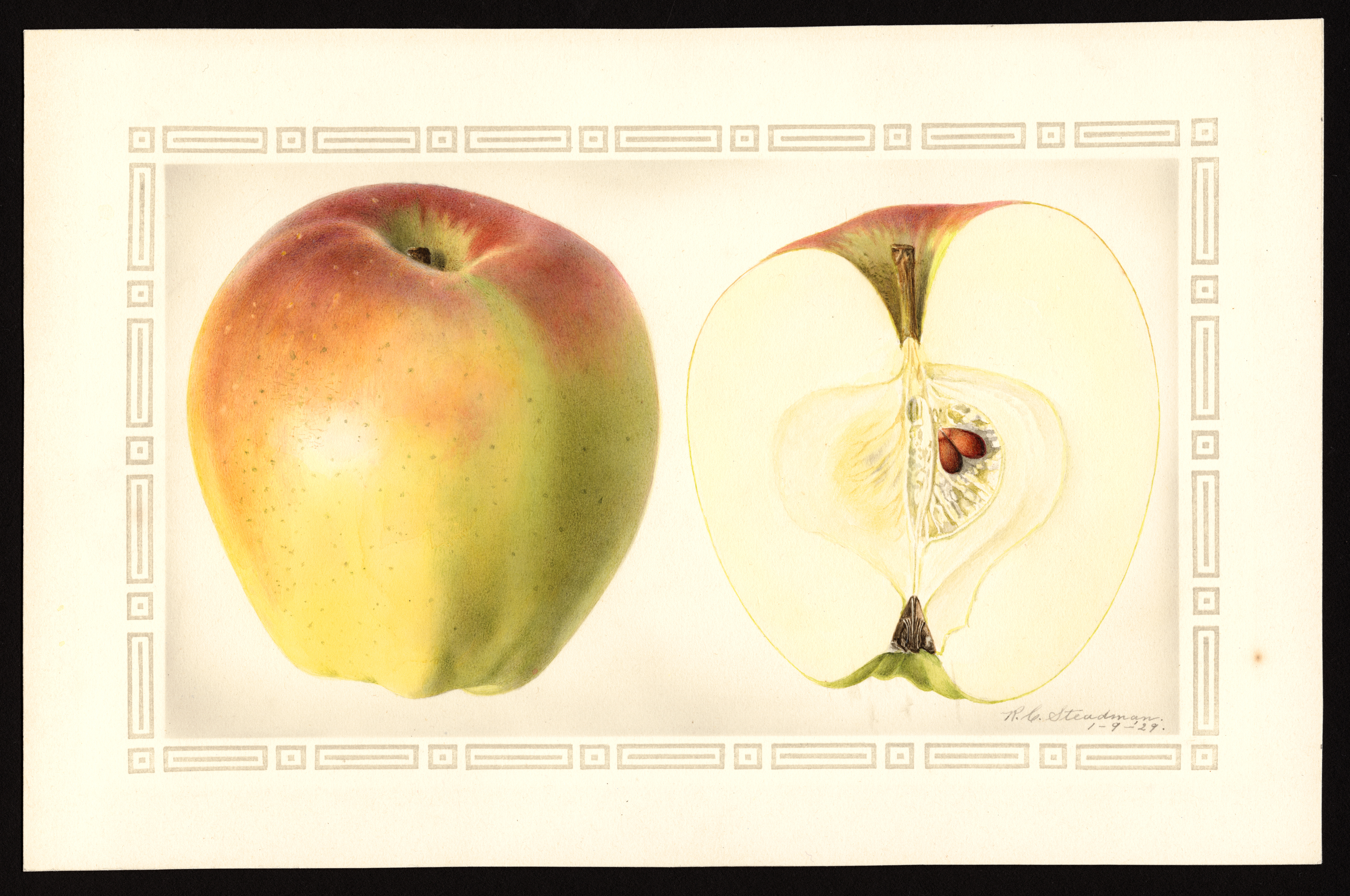
- Hybrid parentage: 'White Winter Pearmain' × ?
- Cultivar: 'Indo'
- Origin: Japan

The 'Indo' apple cultivar has been known since 1930. The fruit is very sweet.
