= Pierre Dansereau =

Canadian ecologist (1911–2011)

Pierre Dansereau CC GOQ FRSC
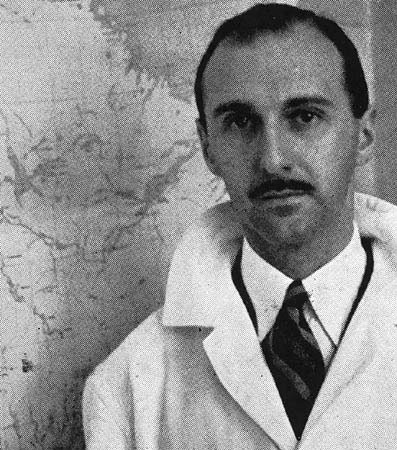
- Dansereau, circa 1942–43
- Born: October 5, 1911; Outremont, Quebec, Canada
- Died: September 28, 2011 (aged 99)
- Education: University of Geneva
- Known for: ecology
- Scientific career
- Workplaces: Montreal Botanical Garden; University of Michigan; Université du Québec à Montréal

Pierre Dansereau CC GOQ FRSC (October 5, 1911 – September 28, 2011) was a Canadian ecologist from Quebec known as one of the "fathers of ecology".

== Biography ==
Born in Outremont, Quebec (now part of Montreal), he received a Bachelor of Science in Agriculture (B.Sc.A.) in 1936 and a Ph.D. in Biological Science in 1939 from the University of Geneva. From 1939 until 1942 he worked at the Montreal Botanical Garden. From 1943 until 1950 he taught at the Université de Montréal. From 1950 until 1955 he worked at the University of Michigan Botanical Gardens. From 1955 until 1961 he worked in the Faculty of Science and as the director of the Botanical Institute at the Université de Montréal. In 1961 he returned to the United States as the assistant director of the New York Botanical Garden and as a professor of botany and geography at the Columbia University. From 1972 until 1976 he was the Director of the Research Centre for Sciences and the Environment at the Université du Québec à Montréal (UQAM). In 1988 he was made a Professor Emeritus at UQAM, but he still worked there after mandatory retirement (in 1976, at 65 years old) to year 2004, aged 93.

He was the subject of a 2001 documentary An Ecology of Hope by his cousin, Quebec filmmaker Fernand Dansereau.

On September 28, 2011, Pierre Dansereau died, one week before his 100th birthday, after 76 years of marriage, and three months after his wife (a painter) became a centenarian — they had no children.

UQAM's Complexe des sciences Pierre-Dansereau was named for him.

== Honours ==
In 1987 the Canadian Botanical Association awarded him the George Lawson Medal.

- 1949 - Made a Fellow of the Royal Society of Canada (MSRC)
- 1959 - Awarded an Honorary Doctor of Laws from the University of Saskatchewan
- 1965 - Awarded the Léo-Pariseau Prize
- 1969 - Made a Companion of the Order of Canada
- 1971 - Awarded honorary doctorate from Sir George Williams University, which later became Concordia University.
- 1972 - Delivered the Massey Lecture
- 1973 - Awarded the Royal Canadian Geographical Society's Massey Medal
- 1974 - Won the Molson Prize
- 1983 - Awarded the Université de Sherbrooke's prix Esdras-Minville
- 1983 - Won the Government of Quebec's Prix Marie-Victorin
- 1985 - Made a Knight of the National Order of Quebec; promoted to Grand Officer in 1992
- 1985 - Awarded the Canada Council for the Arts' Killam Prize
- 1986 - Awarded the Canadian Botanical Association's George Lawson Medal
- 1995 - Awarded the Royal Society of Canada's Sir John William Dawson Medal
- 2001 - Inducted into the Canadian Science and Engineering Hall of Fame
- 2012 - Fellow of the Ecological Society of America
