= Akane (apple) =

Apple cultivar

Malus pumila 'Akane'
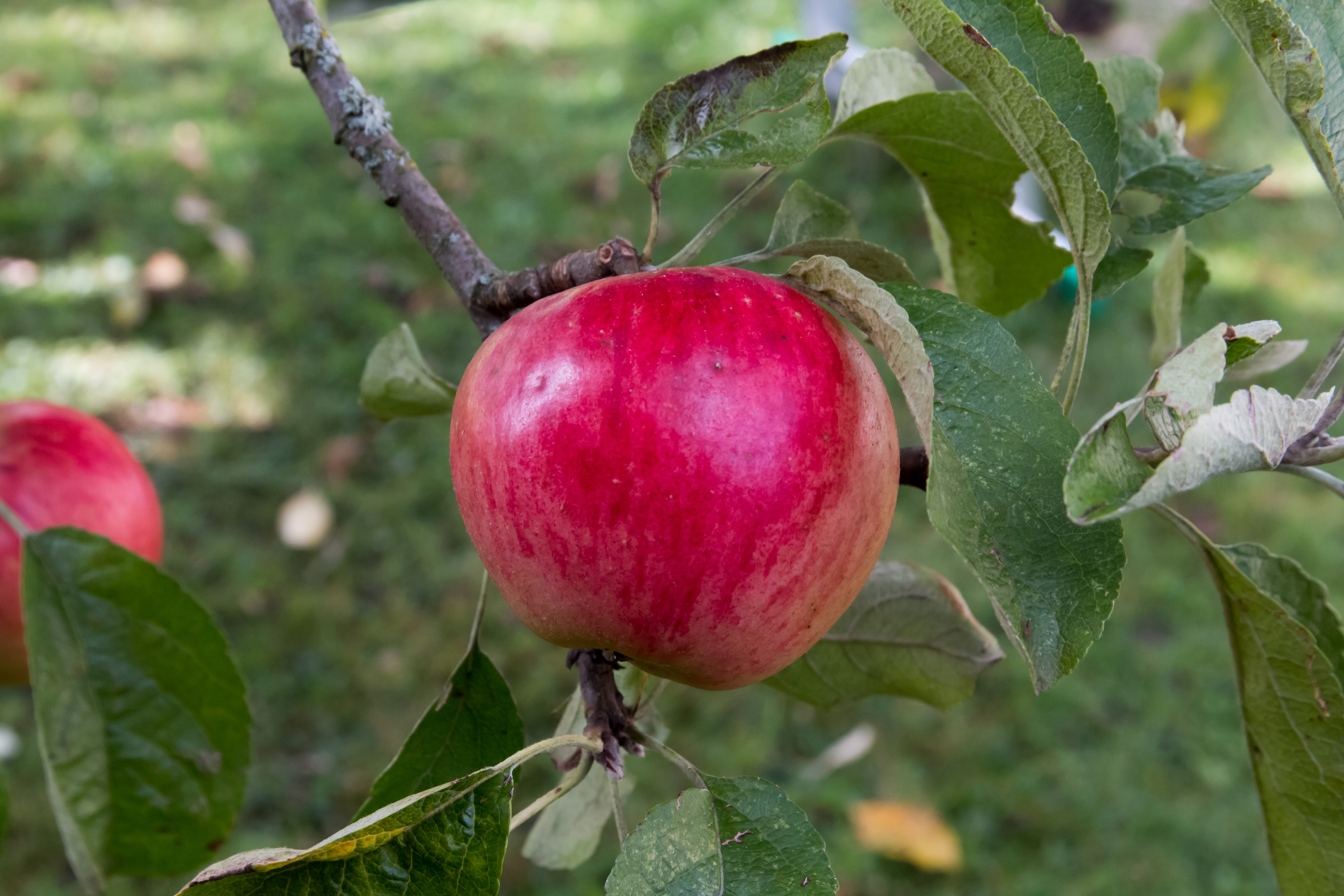
- Species: Malus pumila
- Hybrid parentage: 'Jonathan' × 'Worcester Pearmain'
- Cultivar: 'Akane'
- Origin: Japan, 1939

'Akane', also known as 'Tokyo Rose', 'Tohoku No.3' and 'Prime Red', is a Japanese cultivar of domesticated apple, that according to Orange Pippin is one of the best early season apples.

'Akane' was developed by the Morioka Experimental Station of Japan sometime in 1939,by crossing a Jonathan apple with a Worcester Pearmain, and was introduced to the United States, where it is very popular.

== Description ==
'Akane' is of moderately good disease resistance, best at warm climates but tolerates cold also. It flowers mid-late season, and should be harvested early-mid season. It is self-sterile and needs to be cross pollinated.

It produces heavy crop of variable sized fruits, usually more to the smaller side, but good sized apples can be obtained by thinning.

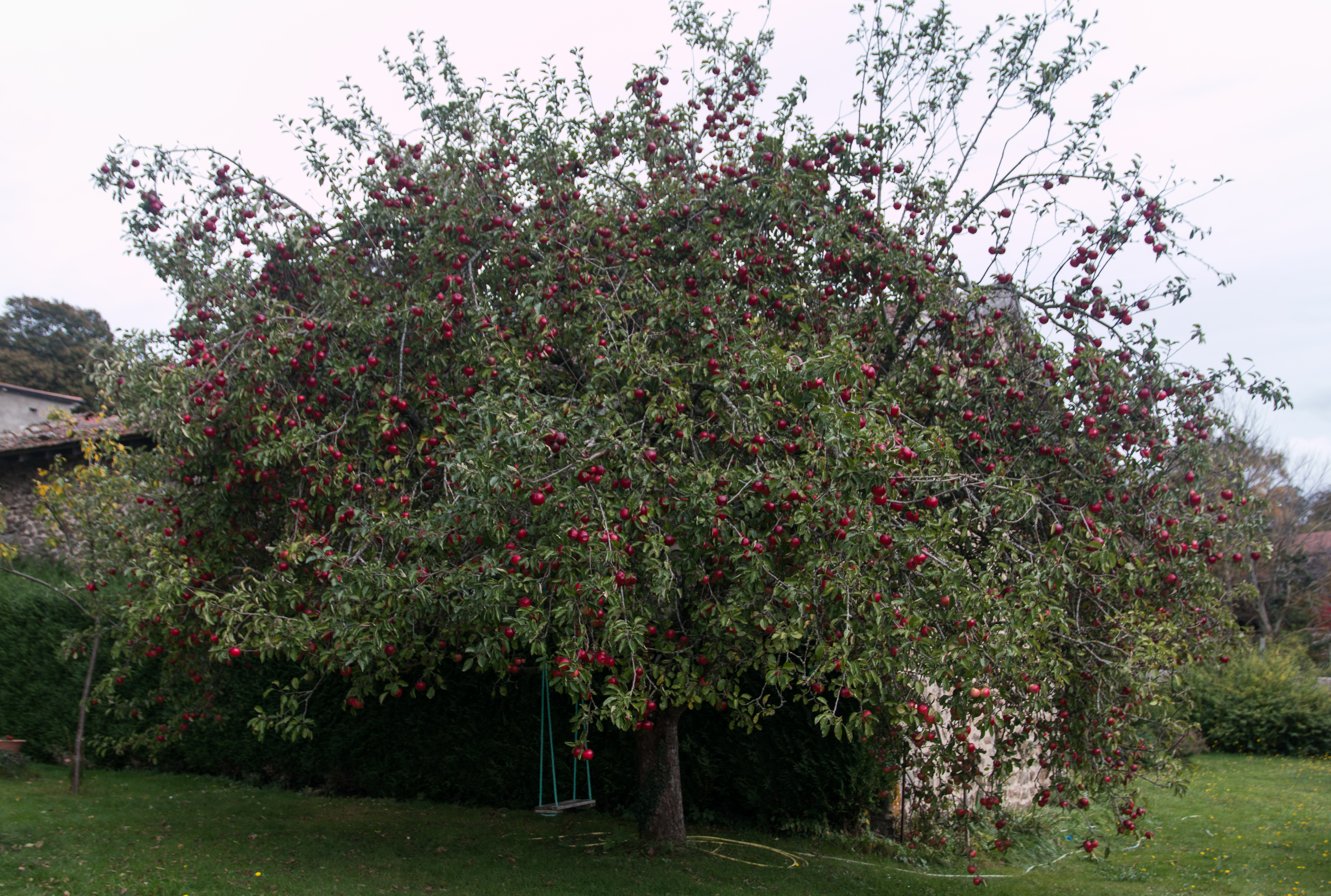
'Akane' apple tree.

'Akane' carries the fruit shape of the English 'Worcester Pearmain', with its sweet and sharp flavor influenced by the American 'Jonathan'. Shape ranges from flattened to heart-shaped. The apple can be used in both eating and cooking. Skin color is red; flesh color is white, with a yellow tinge. The flesh does not oxidize quickly.

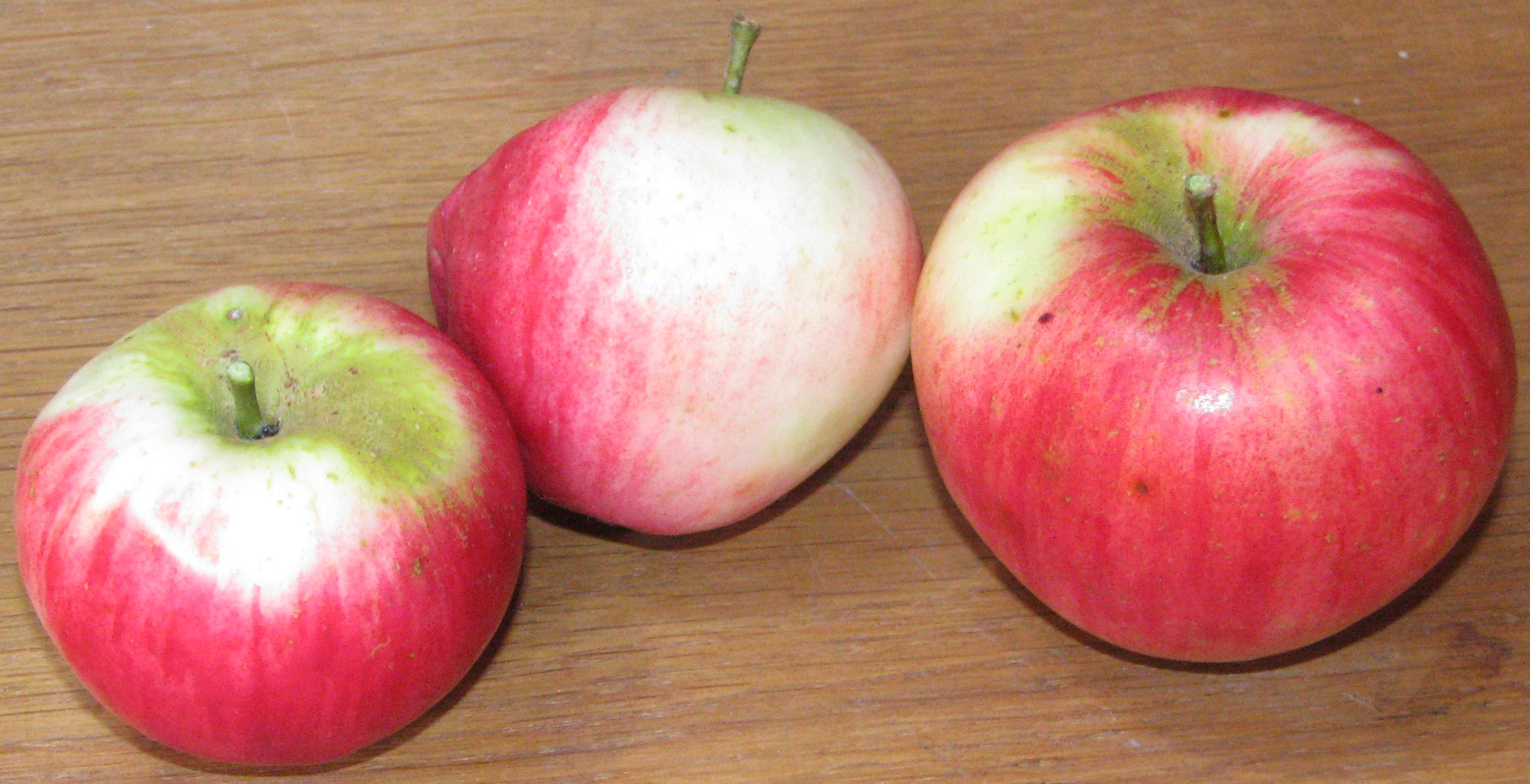
'Akane' apples

== See also ==
- Fuji (apple)
- Hokuto (apple)
- Tsugaru (apple)
