= List of writers on Buddhism =

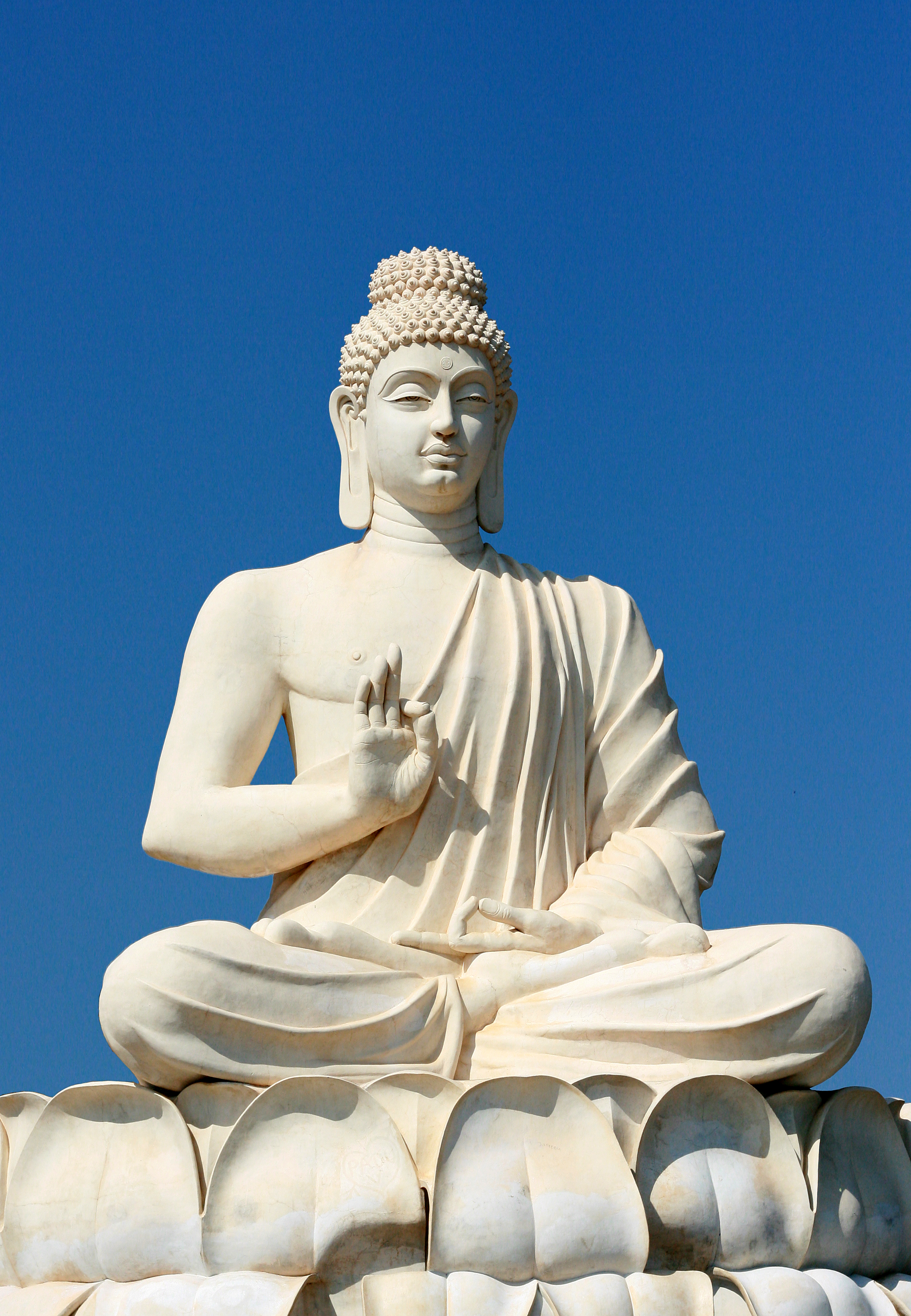
Buddha's statue near Belum Caves Andhra Pradesh India

This is a list of writers on Buddhism. The list is intended to include only those writers who have written books about Buddhism, and about whom there is already a Wikipedia article. Each entry needs to indicate the writer's most well-known work. Multiple works should be listed only if each work already has a Wikipedia article.

== Early Buddhism ==
Early Buddhism is the oldest Buddhism, before the split into several sects. The only surviving school is Theravada. Early Buddhism is still being studied by scholars.

- Y. Karunadasa
- Hajime Nakamura
- C. A. F. Rhys Davids
- T. W. Rhys Davids
- A. K. Warder

== Theravada Buddhism ==
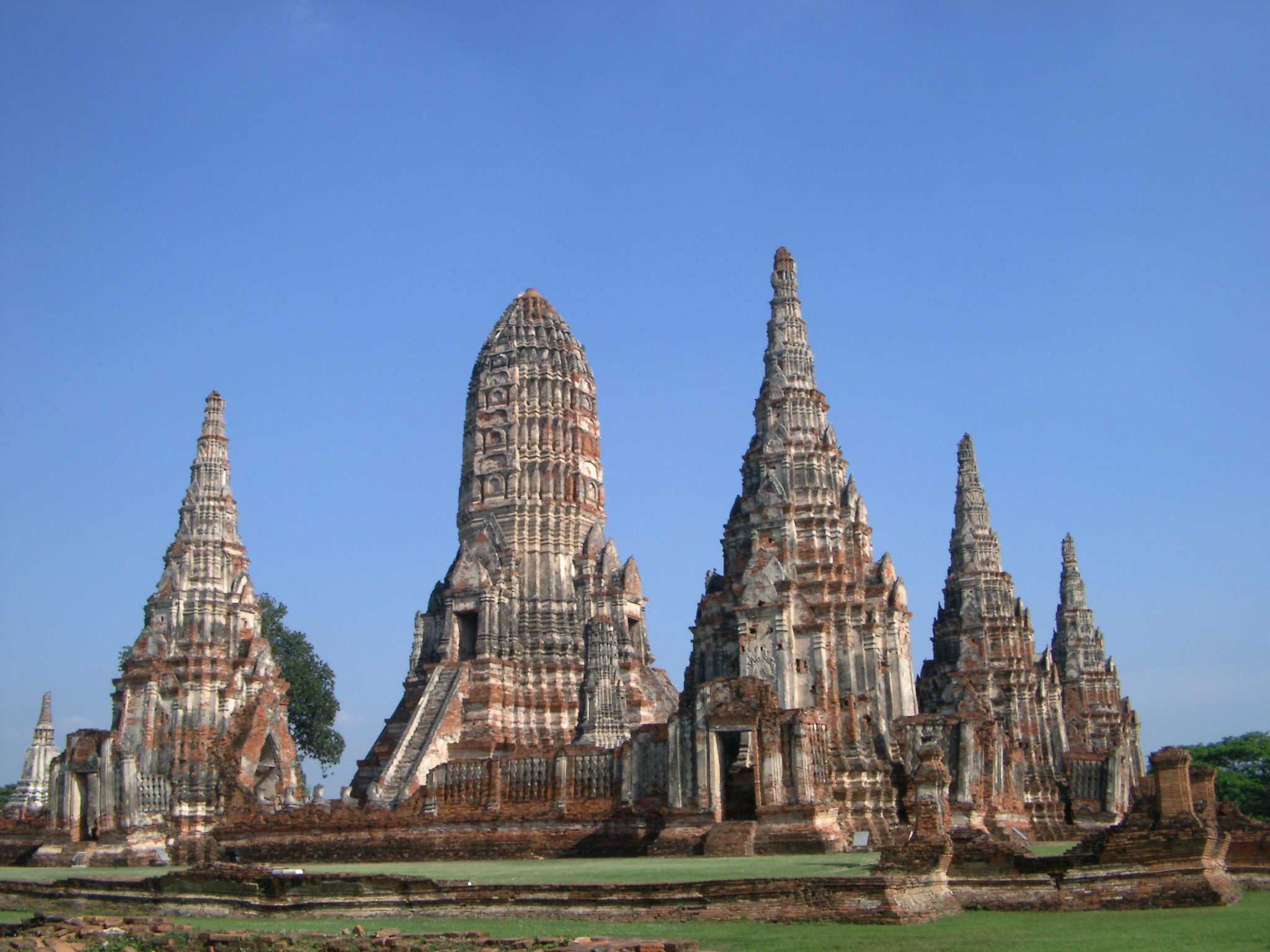
Wat Chaiwatthanaram temple in the old city of Ayutthaya in Thailand.

=== Other Theravada writers ===
- Rajguru Aggavamsa Mahathera
- Ajahn Amaro
- Ajahn Tong Sirimangalo
- Ampitiye Rahula Maha Thero
- Bhikkhu Analayo
- Bhadant Anand Kausalyayan
- Ananda Metteyya
- Ashin Ananda
- Aniruddha Mahathera
- Balangoda Ananda Maitreya Thero
- B. R. Ambedkar
- Sayagyi U Ba Khin
- Samanera Bodhesako
- Bhikkhu Bodhi
- Ajahn Brahmavamso
- Buddhādasa Bhikkhu
- Buddhaghosa Mahasthavir
- Acharya Buddharakkhita
- Ajahn Candasiri
- Ven. K. Sri Dhammananda
- Dhammalok Mahasthavir
- Ashin Dhammasāmi
- Phra Dhammavisuddhikavi
- Dharmaditya Dharmacharya
- Anagarika Dharmapala
- Ernest Reinhold Rost
- Frank Lee Woodward
- Preah Maha Ghosananda
- S. N. Goenka
- Gregory Paul Kramer
- Hammalawa Saddhatissa
- Henepola Gunaratana
- Henry Steel Olcott
- Jack Kornfield
- Ajahn Jayasāro
- Joanna Rogers Macy
- Joseph Goldstein
- Jyotipal Mahathero
- Katukurunde Nyanananda Thera
- Ayya Khema
- Kotugoda Dhammawasa Mahanayaka Thero
- Kumar Kashyap Mahasthavir
- Larry Rosenberg
- Ledi Sayadaw
- Ajahn Lee
- Madihe Pannaseeha Thero
- Mahasi Sayadaw
- S. Mahinda
- Matara Sri Nanarama Mahathera
- Matthew Flickstein
- Nanamoli Bhikkhu
- Nanavira Thera
- Narada Maha Thera
- Nauyane Ariyadhamma Mahathera
- Nyanadassana Mahathera
- Nyanaponika Thera
- Nyanatiloka Mahathera
- Pa-Auk Sayadaw
- Phra Paisal Visalo
- Palane Vajiragnana Thero
- Sayadaw U Pandita
- U Pannya Jota Mahathera
- Ajahn Pasanno
- Paul Dahlke
- Pragyananda Mahasthavir
- Prayudh Payutto
- Piyadassi Maha Thera
- Rahul Sankrityayan
- Rerukane Chandawimala Thero
- Sayadaw U Rewata Dhamma
- Shaila Catherine
- Sharon Salzberg
- Sīlācāra
- U Sīlānanda
- Achan Sobin S. Namto
- Soma Thera
- Stephen T. Asma
- Sudarshan Mahasthavir
- Ajahn Sucitto
- Ajahn Sumedho
- Bhante Sujato
- Sujin Boriharnwanaket
- Ajahn Sundara
- Sylvia Boorstein
- Thanissaro Bhikkhu
- Sayadaw U Thittila
- Sister Vajirā
- Ajahn Viradhammo
- Walpola Rahula
- Webu Sayadaw
- Weligama Sri Sumangala
- R. G. de S. Wettimuny
- Yagirala Pannananda

=== Politics ===
- B. R. Ambedkar, religious Leader, jurist, political leader, Buddhist activist, philosopher, thinker, anthropologist, historian, orator, writer, economist, scholar, editor, revolutionary and the revivalist of Buddhism in India. He was also the chief architect of the Indian Constitution.
- Aung San Suu Kyi, political activist

=== Scholars ===
- Ashin Nandamalabhivamsa
- Benimadhab Barua
- Charles Hallisey
- David Kalupahana
- K.L. Dhammajoti
- K.N. Jayatilleke
- Karl Eugen Neumann
- Isaline Blew Horner
- L. S. Cousins
- Mingun Sayadaw
- P.D. Premasiri
- Polwatte Buddhadatta Thera
- Rajguru Aggavamsa Mahathera
- Rerukane Chandawimala Thero
- Richard Gombrich
- Robert Chalmers, 1st Baron Chalmers
- Rupert Gethin
- List of Sāsana Azani recipients, Buddhist monks who have successfully passed the Tipiṭakadhara (oral) and Tipiṭakakovida (written) examinations in Myanmar and only fifteen monks have been recognized as "Sāsana Azani".

== Mahayana Buddhism ==
Although Mahayana Buddhism is virtually extinct in India, its philosophical systems, namely the Madhyamaka and Yogacara are still being studied.

=== Chán/Zen ===
Bodhidharma and Huike

==== Teachers ====
- Reb Anderson
- Taisen Deshimaru
- Norman Fischer
- Gil Fronsdal
- Steve Hagen
- Hsuan Hua
- Nan Huai-Chin
- Philip Kapleau
- Dainin Katagiri
- Long Gen
- Taizan Maezumi
- Diane Musho Hamilton
- Thich Nhat Hanh
- Kitaro Nishida
- Shohaku Okumura
- Paul Reps
- Seung Sahn
- Seongcheol
- Sheng-yen
- Brad Warner
- Alan Watts
- Hsing Yun
- Han Yong-un
- Hakuun Yasutani
- Peter Levitt
- Gyomay Kubose
- Marvin Harada
- Kenryu Takashi Tsuji

==== Scholars ====
- Alfred Bloom
- Edward Conze
- Nishitani Keiji, Japanese philosopher
- Nishida Kitaro, Japanese philosopher
- Kogen Mizuno, Japanese scholar
- Red Pine
- Theodore Stcherbatsky, Russian, wrote Buddhist Logic
- D.T. Suzuki, Japanese scholar
- Stephen F. Teiser

==== Other ====
- Alan Watts, American philosopher and lecturer

=== Humanistic Buddhism (China) ===
- Taixu
- Yin Shun

=== Nichiren Buddhism (Japan) ===
- Tanaka Chigaku
- Daisaku Ikeda
- Nikkyo Niwano

== Vajrayana Buddhism ==
Vajrayana originated as Tantra in India.

=== Tibetan Buddhism ===
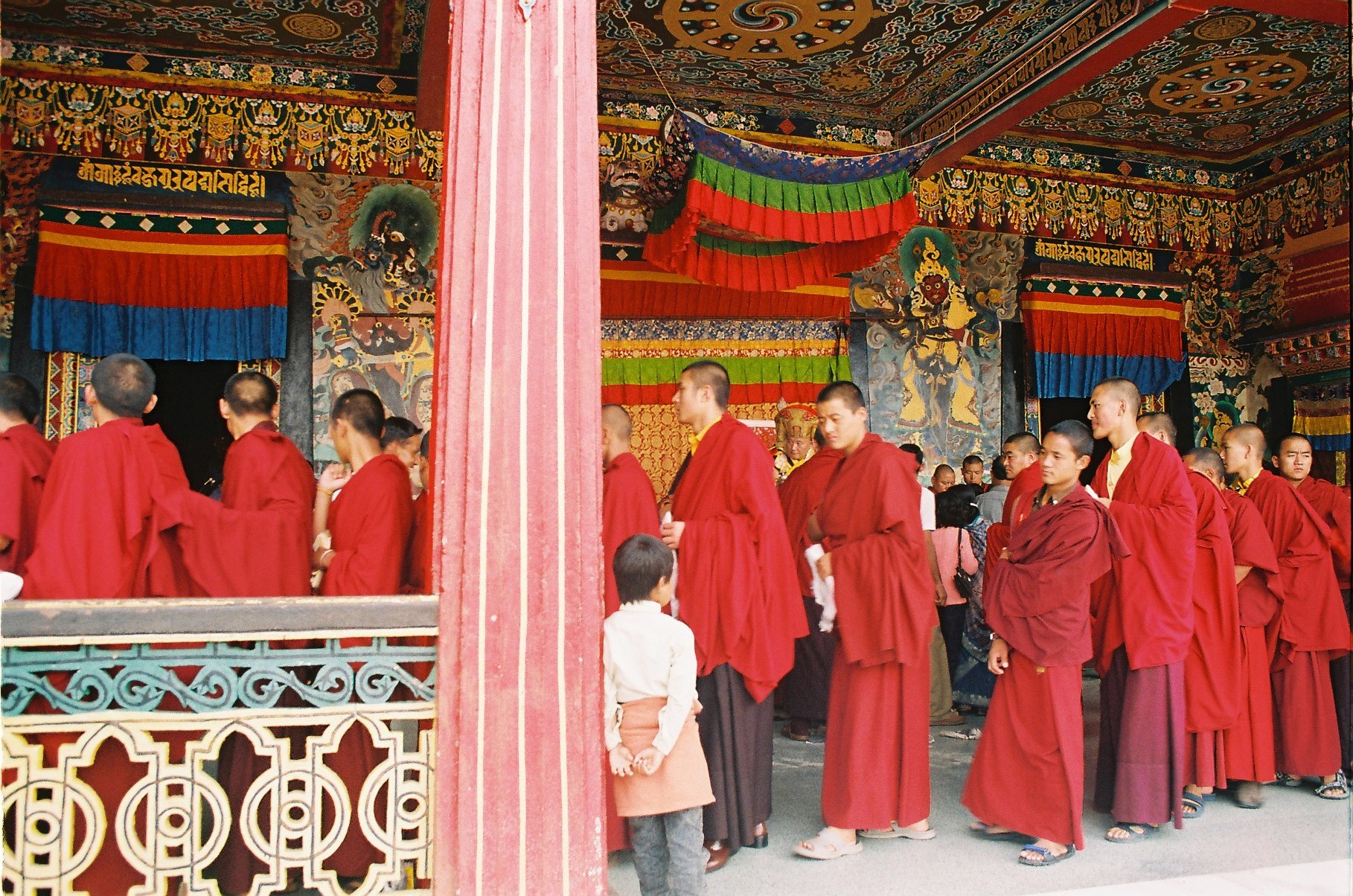
Tibetan Buddhist monks at Rumtek Monastery in Sikkim

Vajrayana was introduced in Tibet, preferring Indian Buddhism over Chinese Buddhism, where it still survives.

==== Religious writers ====
- Pema Chödrön
- Dalai Lama
- Anagarika Govinda
- Kelsang Gyatso
- Khyentse Norbu
- Namkhai Norbu
- Thinley Norbu
- Ole Nydahl
- Matthieu Ricard
- Sangharakshita
- Sogyal Rinpoche
- Surya Das
- Thrangu Rinpoche
- Chögyam Trungpa

==== Scholars ====
- Alexander Berzin
- Lokesh Chandra
- Alexandra David-Néel
- Walter Evans-Wentz
- Herbert V. Günther
- Christmas Humphreys
- Robert Thurman
- Donald S. Lopez Jr.

== Navayana Buddhism ==
- B. R. Ambedkar
- Damodar Dharmananda Kosambi
- Iyothee Thass
- Shanti Swaroop Baudh

== Western Buddhism ==
- Gil Fronsdal
- Stephen Batchelor
- David Brazier
- Meredith Monk
- Mark Epstein
- Vidyamala Burch

== Writers of fiction and literature ==
- Matsuo Bashō, Japanese poet and journalist
- Jack Kerouac, US poet and novelist
- Tom Lowenstein, English poet, cultural historian and translator
- Peter Matthiessen, US novelist
- Ruth Ozeki, US novelist
- Jess Row, short story writer
- Gary Snyder, US poet
- Allen Ginsberg, US poet

== Writing instructors ==
- Natalie Goldberg

== See also ==
- Access to Insight
- Buddhist Cultural Centre
- Buddhist Publication Society
- Dhamma Society Fund
- Dharma Seed
- Pali Text Society
- Pariyatti (bookstore)
- List of Buddhists
- List of modern scholars in Buddhist studies
