= Wettimuny =

Wettimuny is a surname. Notable people with the surname include:

- Mithra Wettimuny (1951–2019), Sri Lankan cricketer
- R. G. de S. Wettimuny (1925–1974), Buddhist writer
- Sidath Wettimuny, Sri Lankan cricketer
- Sunil Wettimuny (born 1949), Sri Lankan cricketer
