= Sister Vajirā =

Personal life
- Born: Hannelore Wolf; 14 October 1928 Hamburg, Germany
- Died: 7 December 1991 (aged 63) Maschen, Germany
- Occupation: Buddhist nun

Religious life
- Religion: Buddhism
- School: Theravada

Senior posting
- Teacher: Nanavira Thera
- Based in: Sri Lanka
- Website: nanavira.org pathpress.org

Sister Vajirā (Hannelore Wolf) was a dasa sil mata, a Buddhist ten precept-holder nun in Sri Lanka.

== Lay life ==
Hannelore was looking for religious meanings and in early summer 1949 she came across the teachings of the Buddha. Hannelore was so impressed that she came to the seminary group of Debes, one of the most prominent lay Theravada teachers at that time, and took part in her first “weeks of investigation” in an Adult Education College in the Lüneburger Heide area. She worked as a private teacher. In June 1954 the Sinhalese monk Ven. Nārada turned up in Hamburg and Hannelore took the opportunity to request to go to Ceylon and become a nun. Ven. Nārada gave Pali names to many Buddhists and Hannelore became Vajirā. After much turmoil she finally got her chance to go to Ceylon. She took on the 10 training rules and was ordained as Sister Vajirā by Ven. Nārada on the full moon of July in 1955 at the Vihāra Mahā Devi Hermitage at Biyagāma near Colombo, where other Buddhist nuns (dasa sil mata or dasa sila upāsikā) lived.

== Life as a nun ==
To provide her with greater quietude, supporters built a bungalow for her in the palm-tree forest of the monastery garden. However, she suffered internal lack and noticed that she could not possibly meditate all day long and became physically ill. Taking on scholastic work offered itself as a way out of her frustration. Having learned English quickly, she then started intensive Pali studies and soon started to translate texts and carried on correspondence about Dhamma topics with various people.

One of the dāyakas of the monastery offered her healthier conditions and arranged for a nice bungalow to be built, into which she moved in 1959. Young Sinhalese women venerated her very much there, and one of them lived temporarily with her as a disciple.

Around autumn of 1961 the English monk Ven. Ñānavīra Thera, who lived 40 km from her in a kuti in the jungle as a hermit, had sent her a text he had written, A Note on Paticca Samuppāda, wherein he criticized the extension-over-three-lives interpretation. Thereupon an intensive exchange of letters followed. The early letters show a woman who, in her own thinking and discussion with Ven. Ñānavīra, earnestly searches a way to approach the essence of the Buddha's Teaching by repeated trial-and-error. This search finally yielded its fruit when she, by her own account (as given in a letter to Ñānavīra Thera), attained sotāpatti, or Stream-entry in late January 1962. The one who has "entered the stream" has ipso facto abandoned personality-view (sakkāya-ditthi), which is the self-view implicit in the experience of an ordinary worldling not free from ignorance, and understood the essential meaning of the Buddha's teaching on the Four Noble Truths. But the rapidity and intensity of the change of her views caused a kind of nervous breakdown and she disrobed, returning to Germany on 22 February 1962.

== Back in Germany ==
Upon her return to Hamburg she ceased to have any contact with her former Buddhist friends. This, commented Ven. Nāṇavīra, was "a good sign, not a bad one- when one has got what one wants, one stops making a fuss about it and sits down quietly." After recovering from her breakdown she started to work for a textile machine factory, Artos, in Hamburg. She still held Ven. Nāṇavīra in high esteem. In 1986 Samanera Bodhesako had written to her from Ceylon to request permission to publish parts of her letters to Ven. Ñānavīra in the planned book Clearing the Path and she consented. Dr Hellmuth Hecker visited her in 1989, they had a two and half hours conversation and she stated that she was still a Buddhist. She died on 7 December 1991 in her room in Maschen.

== Published work ==
- The Letters of Sister Vajira - Correspondence between Nanavira Thera and Sister Vajira, Path Press Publications, 2010, ISBN 9789460900020
- Sakka’s Quest: Sakkapañha Sutta (DN 21) , Buddhist Publication Society, 1959

== See also ==
- Path Press
- Buddhist Publication Society
