= Path Press =

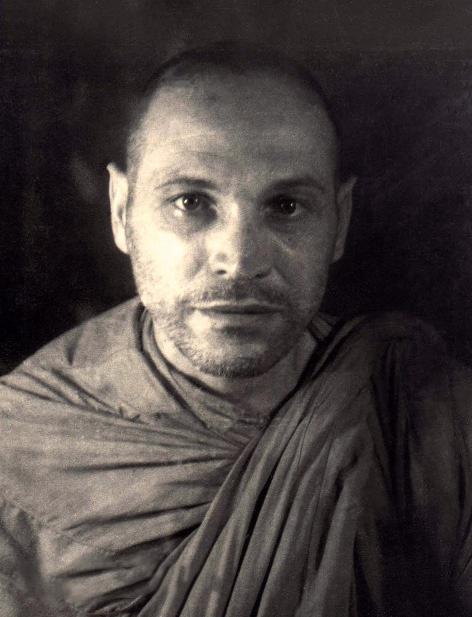
Samanera Bodhesako, the founder of Path Press.

Path Press is a non-profit entity, which handles legal matters and holds the copyrights of all Ven. Ñāṇavīra Thera's writings together with some the writings from others; Path Press Publications is an independent non-profit publisher of books by Ven. Ñāṇavīra Thera and the writings of Samanera Bodhesako. It has its office in the Netherlands.

The Path Press is also a society whose goal is to explain and spread the doctrine of the Buddha. It was founded in Sri Lanka in 1987 by Samanera Bodhesako. Originally conceived as a limited effort to publish Clearing the Path but later become an entity who is holding copyrights of writing of Ñāṇavīra Thera and it consist of the small group of 4 bhikkhus and 5 layman (upāsakas) who are aspiring to make late Ven. Ñāṇavīra Thera's teachings more available for those who are interested.

== About ==
Path Press was a name of convenience, originally intended to include those who, through the years, have contributed their various talents to bring Clearing the Path to realization. Path Press was not planned to be an ongoing publishing house. However, it now turns out that there remains sufficient worthwhile materials from the writings of the Venerable Ven. Ñāṇavīra Thera to issue other volumes to the present work; and there are a few other writings, unpublished or now out of print, which, like Clearing the Path, are of high quality, worthy of publication or reprinting. Therefore, it was established a publishing house, called 'Path Press Publications'.

These writings are probably not commercially viable; nor do they represent the views of any established sect, school or university which might sponsor their publication. The idea has been put forward that inasmuch as Path Press has already published one book of this type it could use that experience as a basis for issuing those occasional writings which are of exceptional merit and yet do not attract established publishers.

== Clearing the Path (1960–1965) ==
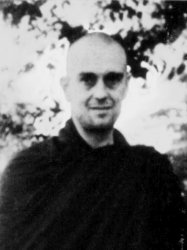
Ven. Ñāṇavīra Thera.

Clearing the Path was the most important work for Path Press.

In 1963, Ñāṇavīra Thera completed a book called Notes on Dhamma (1960–1963), which was privately published by the Honourable Lionel Samaratunga in the same year (250 copies). Following production of that volume, the author amended and added to the text, leaving at his death an expanded typescript, indicated by the titular expansion of its dates, (1960–1965). Notes on Dhamma has been variously described as "arrogant, scathing, and condescending", as "a fantastic system", and as "the most important book to be written in this century". Ñāṇavīra Thera himself remarked of the book that "it is vain to hope that it is going to win general approval... but I do allow myself to hope that a few individuals... will have private transformations of their way of thinking as a result of reading them".

And the influence of Notes on Dhamma on Buddhist thinkers continues to increase more than three decades after its publication. This book has aroused extreme interest and controversy. The Notes "attempt to provide an intellectual basis for the understanding of the Suttas without abandoning saddhā (faith)"; that they "have been written with the purpose of clearing away a mass of dead matter which is choking the Suttas"; and that, above all, "the Notes are designed to be an invitation to the reader to come and share the author's point of view". The Notes assume that the reader's sole interest in the Pali Suttas is a concern for his own welfare. However, the Notes, with their admitted intellectual and conceptual difficulties, are not the only way to discuss right view or to offer right-view guidance.

Letters are a selection of 150 letters written by Ñāṇavīra Thera from his kuti in the Bundala Forest Reserve to local and foreign readers of the Notes who had requested explanation and clarification. Some are thinly disguised essays in a wholly modern idiom. The letters which are collected and published in Clearing the Path are not only something of a commentary on the Notes; they are, independently, a lucid discussion of how an individual concerned fundamentally with self-disclosure deals with the dilemma of finding himself in an intolerable situation, where the least undesirable alternative is suicide.

With openness, calmness, and considerable wit Ñāṇavīra Thera discusses with his correspondents (including his doctor, a judge, a provincial businessman, a barrister, a British diplomat, and another British citizen) the illnesses that plague him and what he can and cannot do about them, and about his own existence. His life as a Buddhist monk in a remote jungle abode is not incidental to the philosophy he expounds: the two are different aspects of the same thing, namely a vision that penetrates into the human situation both as universal and as particular, and recognizes that it is this situation which it is the business of each of us to resolve for ourselves. In presenting this view Ñāṇavīra Thera offers a contemporary exposition of the Teaching of the Buddha. In living this view he evokes a dramatic situation wherein an individual resolutely faces those questions which every lucid person must eventually face. The letters are in language, idiom and quotations from a galaxy of thinkers such as Camus, Heidegger, Kierkegaard, Sartre, Kafka. Though familiar to a Western reader, it can be incomprehensible in part, to anyone without such background.

Most of the editorial work connected with Ñāṇavīra Thera's writings was performed by Sāmanera Bodhesako (Robert Smith), who died in Kathmandu in 1988. During the last years of his life in Sri Lanka he founded Path Press which published Clearing the Path: Writings of Ñāṇavīra Thera (1960-1965). He also worked as editor for the Buddhist Publication Society in Kandy which published The Tragic, The Comic & The Personal: Selected Letters of Ñāṇavīra Thera (Wheel 339/341) in 1987. Prof. Forrest Williams of the University of Colorado also participated as the co-editor of Clearing the Path. It is now out of print. The Buddhist Cultural Centre decided to issue it in its two constituent parts, Notes on Dhamma and Letters.

== Published books ==
- The Tragic, the Comic, and Personal, BPS, 1987, ISBN 978-955-24-0000-1
- Clearing the Path, Path Press, 1987 (out of print)
- Notes on Dhamma, Path Press Publications, 2009, ISBN 9789460900013
- Letters to Sister Vajirā, Path Press Publications, 2010, ISBN 9789460900020
- Clearing the Path, Path Press Publications, 2011, ISBN 9789460900044
- Seeking the Path, Path Press Publications, 2011, ISBN 9789460900037
- Getting Off, A Portrait of an American Buddhist Monk, Path Press Publications, 2012, ISBN 9789460900051
- Stringhoppers and Rabbitholes, Letters of a Wayfarer, Path Press Publications, 2013, ISBN 9789460900068
- The Hermit of Bundala, Bhikkhu H. Ñāṇasuci, Path Press Publications, 2014, ISBN 9789460900082
- Meanings, Bhikkhu Ninoslav Ñāṇamoli, Path Press Publications, 2014, ISBN 9789460900099
- The Silent Sages of the Old, Suttas from the Suttanipāta (e-book), Bhikkhu Ninoslav Ñāṇamoli, Path Press Publications, 2018, ISBN 9789460900198

== Websites ==
- www.pathpress.org - Path Press
- www.pathpresspublications.com - Path Press Publications
- www.nanavira.org - Ñāṇavīra Thera Dhamma Page
