= R. G. de S. Wettimuny =

Ramsay Wettimuny

Personal life
- Born: 26 January 1925 Sri Lanka
- Died: 13 July 1974 (aged 49) Sri Lanka
- Partner: Indrani
- Children: Sunil, Mithra, Ranjan, Sidath and Nimal
- Education: Ananda College, Sri Lanka
- Occupation: writer, Double Chartered engineer

Religious life
- Religion: Buddhist
- School: Theravada

Senior posting
- Teacher: Ven. Ñāṇavīra Thera
- Website: pathpress.org

Ramsay G. de Silva Wettimuny (January 26, 1925 — July 13, 1974) was a Buddhist writer.

== Writings ==
He was attracted to the Dhamma from his young days and, in the later stages of his life, he practically gave up wordily activities and devoted himself entirely to Dhamma.

Wettimuny was in his early time interested in science and Buddhism, which resulted in his writing the book 'Buddhism and Its Relation to Religion and Science'. Later he discovered Ven. Ñāṇavīra Thera through reading his book 'Notes on Dhamma'. Wettimuny liked Ñāṇavīra's writings because they were based in Science as known at that time—science and Buddhism. Wettimuny sent him a copy of his book, however Ñāṇavīra found a conflict in it. He had a serious criticism, and sent back a letter. Wettimuny promptly went to see Ñāṇavīra, and then changed his views on Dhamma, which had a profound effect on his later writings. Wettimuny still continued to go and meet Ñāṇavīra. Later on Wettimuny got more knowledge, and become more articulate. His last book, 'The Buddha's Teaching and the Ambiguity of Existence' (published posthumously) became one of the classics among modern Buddhist books.

His writings are not superficial; like Ñāṇavīra's, they require the reader to penetrate and reach the essential meaning of the Buddha's Teaching. His writings “cannot compared with the general run of books on Buddhism and should stand by itself with a few works which have challenged the superficial views of the Dhamma so popular today.” Moreover, his writings can be considered unorthodox among Sri Lankan Buddhists. “But it would be so regarded only by those who probably for the lack of something more adequate have accepted as orthodox some current misinterpretation of the Suttas (Discourses).” Wettimuny was also addressing primarily those who were disquieted by existentialism or existential questions, and sought a solution to the ambiguity of existence.

== Books written by Wettimuny ==
During this time he wrote five books on Buddhism:

- Buddhism and Its Relation to Religion and Science, (Buddhist Research Society, 1984)
- The Buddha's Teaching and the Ambiguity of Existence, (Gunasena, 1978)
- The Buddha's Teaching: Its Essential Meaning, (M. D. Gunasena, Colombo, 1969)
- The Calm After the Storm, (M. D. Gunasena, 1970)
- Budu dahama saha eya āgamaṭat vidyāvaṭat sama-visama vana ayuru: (Ăm. Ḍī. Guṇasēna, 1967)

== Personal life ==
He was educated in Ananda College. He was a Double Chartered engineer (Mechanical and Civil), married with Indrani, and had 5 boys: Sunil, Mithra, Ranjan, Sidath and Nimal. Ramsay taught his sons how to play cricket and it was totally his effort which brought Sri Lanka to the level of international cricket. Sunil and Sidath played in two world cups.
