= Christian Coseru =

American philosopher

Education
- Education: University of Bucharest (BA); University of Bucharest (MA); Australian National University (PhD)

Philosophical work
- Era: 21st-century philosophy
- Region: Western philosophy / Cross-cultural philosophy
- School: Phenomenology, Buddhist philosophy, Philosophy of mind
- Institutions: College of Charleston; Australian National University; The Asiatic Society
- Main interests: consciousness, self-knowledge, perception, cross-cultural philosophy

Christian Coseru is a Romanian-born American philosopher working at the intersection of phenomenology, Buddhist philosophy, and philosophy of mind. He is a professor of philosophy at the College of Charleston and a Numata Visiting Professor at the University of California, Berkeley. Coseru is the winner of three National Endowment for the Humanities Summer Institute research grants for advancing the study of consciousness and self-knowledge from a global philosophical perspective (in collaboration with Jay Garfield, Evan Thompson, and Alva Noë). He is editor of the Springer Nature Sophia Studies in Cross-cultural Philosophy of Traditions and Cultures.

== Early life and education ==
Coseru was educated at the Vasile Alecsandri National College (Galați), a Gymnasium in Galați, Romania. He pursued initial philosophy studies at the University of Bucharest, where he obtained B.A. and M.A. degrees in philosophy, writing his teza de licenta (roughly equivalent to an M.A. thesis) on Plotinus' theory of emanation under the supervision of Gheorghe Vlăduțescu. In the mid-1990s, Coseru spent four and a half years in India doing advanced study in Sanskrit and Indian philosophy under the supervision of Sibajiban Bhattacharyya. He was affiliated with several research institutes, including The Asiatic Society of Calcutta, Bhandarkar Oriental Research Institute, De Nobili College, and the Central Institute of Higher Tibetan Studies). Coseru completed his Doctor of Philosophy (PhD) degree at the Australian National University under the supervision of Jay L. Garfield and John Powers (academic). His external dissertation examiners were Mark Siderits, Georges Dreyfus, and Purushottama Bilimoria.

== Philosophy ==
Coseru is best known for integrating the ideas of classical Indian Buddhist thinkers (notably Dignāga and Dharmakīrti) with developments in phenomenology (especially Husserl's work on intentionality and Merleau-Ponty's work on perception) and contemporary analytic philosophy of mind. He argues for a phenomenologically informed naturalism that regards the first-person, intentional, and normative dimensions of experience as irreducible. His naturalism treats phenomenology as a mode of inquiry into the structures of lived experience that complements, rather than competes with, the natural sciences.

== Selected publications ==
=== Books ===
- Perceiving Reality: Consciousness, Intentionality, and Cognition in Buddhist Philosophy. Oxford University Press, 2012. ISBN 978-0-1998-4338-1
- Reasons and Empty Persons: Mind, Metaphysics, and Morality. Essays in Honor of Mark Siderits (ed.). Springer, 2023. ISBN 978-3-0311-3994-9

=== Selected articles and chapters ===
- “Can There Be Something It Is Like To Be No One.” Journal of Consciousness Studies 31 (5–6): 62–103 (2024). doi:10.53765/20512201.31.5.062
- “Is Subjectless Consciousness Possible?” Journal of Consciousness Studies 31 (5–6): 5–26 (2024). doi:10.53765/20512201.31.5.006
- “The Middle Way to Reality: On Why I Am Not a Buddhist and Other Philosophical Curiosities.” Sophia 62 (1): 87–110 (2023). doi:10.1007/s11841-021-00854-4
- “Consciousness, Physicalism, and the Problem of Mental Causation.” In Cross-Cultural Approaches to Consciousness, edited by Itay Shani and Susanne Kathrin Beiweis, 71–94. Bloomsbury, 2022. ISBN 978-1350-2385-03
- “Can Global Antirealism Withstand the Enactivist Challenge?” Analysis 82 (1): 131–142 (2022). doi:10.1093/analys/anac006
- “Consciousness, Content, and Cognitive Attenuation: A Neurophenomenological Perspective.” In Routledge Handbook on the Philosophy of Meditation, edited by Rick Repetti, 354–367. Routledge, 2022. ISBN 978-0367-6497-46
- “Freedom From Responsibility: Agent-Neutral Consequentialism and the Bodhisattva Ideal.” In Buddhist Perspectives on Free Will: Agentless Agency? (ed. Rick Repetti), 92–105, 2016. ISBN 978-0367-8748-58
- “Consciousness and Causal Emergence: Śāntarakṣita Against Physicalism.” In The Oxford Handbook of Indian Philosophy (ed. Jonardon Ganeri), 360–378, 2014. ISBN 978-0199-3146-21
- “Consciousness and the Mind-Body Problem in Indian Philosophy.” In Routledge Handbook of Consciousness, ed. R. Gennaro, 92–104, 2018. ISBN 978-0367-5719-00
- "Buddhist ‘Foundationalism’ and the Phenomenology of Perception." Philosophy East and West 59 (4): 409-349. doi:10.1353/pew.0.0078

== See also ==
- Philosophy of mind
- Phenomenology (philosophy)
- Buddhism and Western philosophy
- Buddhist logico-epistemology
