= Ñāṇavīra Thera =

British Theravada Buddhist monk

Ven. Ñāṇavīra Thera
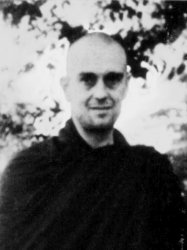
- Title: Thera (Elder)

Personal life
- Born: Harold Edward Musson; 5 January 1920 Aldershot, England
- Died: 5 July 1965 (aged 45) Bundala, Sri Lanka
- Education: B.A. degree in Modern and Medieval Languages from Cambridge University
- Occupation: Buddhist monk
- Website: nanavira.org pathpress.org pathpresspublications.com

Religious life
- Religion: Buddhism
- School: Theravada

Ñāṇavīra Thera (born Harold Edward Musson; 5 January 1920 – 5 July 1965) was an English Theravāda Buddhist monk, ordained in 1950 in Sri Lanka. He is known as the author of Notes on Dhamma, which were later published by Path Press together with his letters in one volume titled Clearing the Path.

== Biography ==
Harold Edward Musson was born at a military barracks at Aldershot in England. His father, Edward Lionel Musson, was a captain in the 1st Manchester Regiment. He spent his youth in the environs of Alton, a small town in the Hampshire Downs, and was equally influenced by the nearby town of Aldershot. It is also very likely that the young Musson spent some time in India or Southeast Asia while his father was on his military assignments.

He went to Wellington College, Berkshire, followed by Magdalene College, Cambridge, in 1938, and spent that summer learning Italian in Perugia, Italy. In June 1939, he sat for Mathematics, and, in 1940, for Modern Languages (in which he earned a "Class One"). Immediately after the outbreak of war, in 1939, he enlisted in the Territorial Royal Artillery. In July 1941, he was commissioned second lieutenant in the Intelligence Corps, where his knowledge of modern languages was an important asset (he was an interrogator). In October 1942, he was promoted to lieutenant, and in April 1944, to temporary captain. His overseas service with the British Eighth Army was spent primarily in Italy, from 1943 to 1946. Despite his military background, a family acquaintance spoke of him as having "completely resented warfare", a sentiment borne out in one of his letters, written in 1964 in Ceylon. Included in the letter were some sardonic comments to the effect that he had much enjoyed travel before his wartime service, and that he agreed with the classification of intelligence into three classes; "human, animal, and military". He received a B.A. degree in modern and medieval languages from Cambridge University for six terms of university study together with three terms allowed for military service.

When the war ended Musson was, according to his own account, in no special need of money and very dissatisfied with his life. In 1948 he was living in London, sharing a flat with a good friend and onetime fellow-officer, Osbert Moore, who felt similarly dissatisfied. They decided to settle their affairs in England, put society behind them, and go to Ceylon to become Buddhist monks. In 1949 they received Novice Ordination at the Island Hermitage, Dodanduwa (from Ven. Ñāṇatiloka), and in 1950 the Higher Ordination as bhikkhus at the Vajirārāma monastery, Colombo. Osbert Moore was given the monastic name of Ñāṇamoli, and Harold Musson that of Ñāṇavīra.

Ñāṇavīra Thera inclined to a solitary life and after a few years at the Island Hermitage he went to a remote section of southeast Ceylon, where he lived alone for the rest of his life in a one-room, brick-and-plaster kuti (hut) with a tile roof, not far from the village of Bundala, on the edge of a large bird sanctuary. Not long after arriving in Ceylon, he contracted a severe case of amoebiasis which continued to plague him for the next fifteen years. The tropical climate and the local food must have been taxing for the physically ailing Westerner. Bhikkhus only accept food which is offered to them by laypeople, and this custom often leaves them with few options concerning their diet. He died on 5 July 1965, by his own hand and deliberate decision. Ñāṇavīra Thera wrote extensively and carefully on the question of suicide, which arose in him because of the severity of the amoebiasis and satyriasis.

== Writings ==
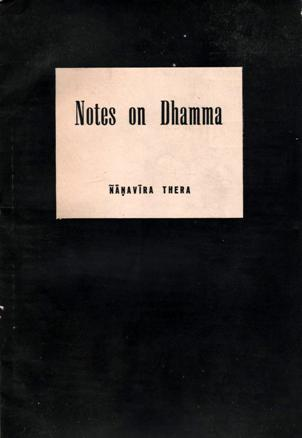
Cover of the first copy of Notes on Dhamma (1963).

Ñāṇavīra Thera's writings fall into two periods: from 1950 until 1960 (the Early Writings), and from 1960 until 1965 (included in Clearing the Path).

The early texts show a man who, in his own thinking and discussion with others, earnestly searches a way to approach the essence of the Buddha's Teaching by repeated trial-and-error. This search has finally yielded its fruit when, after suffering from amoebiasis, Ñāṇavīra Thera claimed to have attained sotāpatti, or stream-entry, an event he recorded in Pali in his private journal on 27 June 1959 -

HOMAGE TO THE AUSPICIOUS ONE, WORTHY, FULLY AWAKENED. - At one time the monk Nanavira was staying in a forest hut near Bundala village. It was during that time, as he was walking up and down in the first watch of the night, that the monk Nanavira made his mind quite pure of constraining things, and kept thinking and pondering and reflexively observing the Dhamma as he had heard and learnt it, the clear and stainless Eye of the Dhamma arose in him: "Whatever has the nature of arising, all that has the nature of ceasing." Having been a teaching-follower for a month, he became one attained to right view.

The one who has "entered the stream" has ipso facto abandoned personality-view (sakkāya-ditthi), which is the self-view implicit in the experience of an ordinary worldling not free from ignorance, and understood the essential meaning of the Buddha's teaching on the Four Noble Truths. Ñāṇavīra Thera's writings after 1960 express this very kind of certainty: no more wandering in the dark, no more doubt or speculative guessing.

One of the foremost purveyors of Buddhism to the West after WW2, Thera had personal correspondence with Julius Evola and translated some of his work on Buddhism.

=== Early writings – Seeking the Path (1950–1960) ===
The main portion of the Early Writings consists of letters written to late Ñānamoli Thera, where the two English monks explored many modes of Western thought (including quantum mechanics). This correspondence lasted until 1960, the year of Ñānamoli Thera's death. Gradually they discovered that the Western thinkers most relevant to their interests were those from the closely allied schools of phenomenology and existentialism, to whom they found themselves indebted for clearing away a lot of mistaken notions with which they had burdened themselves. These letters make clear the nature of that debt; they also make clear the limitations which Ñāṇavīra Thera recognised in those thinkers. He insists upon the fact that while for certain individuals their value may be great, eventually one must go beyond them if one is to arrive at the essence of the Buddha's Teaching. Existentialism, then, is in his view an approach to the Buddha's Teaching and not a substitute for it.

Along with the manuscript letters, which were preserved by the recipient, were found draft copies of some of the replies which were sent to Ñāṇavīra Thera. A few letters written to Ñāṇavīra Thera's chief supporters, Mr. and Mrs. Perera are also included. The two essays following the letters were published: Nibbāna and Anattā and Sketch for a Proof of Rebirth in abbreviated form. In the end there are also the contents of the author's Commonplace Book, Marginalia and a collection of various papers discovered after their author's death (notes, translations, etc.).

=== Later writings – Clearing the Path (1960–1965) ===
In 1963, Ñāṇavīra Thera completed a book called Notes on Dhamma (1960–1963), which was privately published by the Honourable Lionel Samaratunga in the same year (250 copies). Following production of that volume, the author amended and added to the text, leaving at his death an expanded typescript, indicated by the titular expansion of its dates, (1960–1965). Notes on Dhamma has been variously described as "arrogant, scathing, and condescending", as "a fantastic system", and as "the most important book to be written in this century". Ñāṇavīra Thera himself remarked of the book that "it is vain to hope that it is going to win general approval... but I do allow myself to hope that a few individuals... will have private transformations of their way of thinking as a result of reading them".

The influence of Notes on Dhamma on Buddhist thinkers continues to increase more than three decades after its publication. This book has aroused extreme interest and controversy. The Notes "attempt to provide an intellectual basis for the understanding of the Suttas without abandoning saddhā (faith)"; that they "have been written with the purpose of clearing away a mass of dead matter which is choking the Suttas"; and that, above all, "the Notes are designed to be an invitation to the reader to come and share the author's point of view". The Notes assume that the reader's sole interest in the Pali Suttas is a concern for his own welfare. However, the Notes, with their admitted intellectual and conceptual difficulties, are not the only way to discuss right view or to offer right-view guidance.

Cover of Clearing the Path

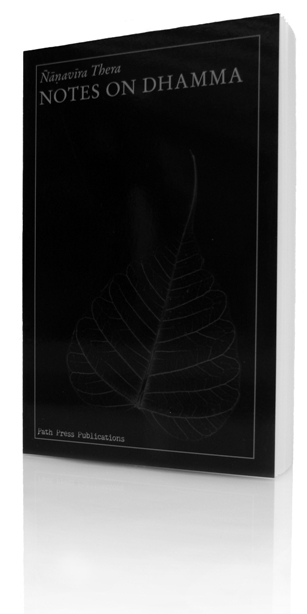
A new edition of Notes on Dhamma restored from the original manuscript in 2009.

Letters are a selection of 150 letters written by Ñāṇavīra Thera from his kuti in the Bundala Forest Reserve to local and foreign readers of the Notes who had requested explanation and clarification. Some are thinly disguised essays in a wholly modern idiom. The letters which are collected and published in Clearing the Path are not only something of a commentary on the Notes; they are, independently, a lucid discussion of how an individual concerned fundamentally with self-disclosure deals with the dilemma of finding himself in an intolerable situation, where the least undesirable alternative is suicide.

With openness, calmness, and considerable wit Ñāṇavīra Thera discusses with his correspondents (including his doctor, a judge, a provincial businessman, a barrister, a British diplomat, and another British citizen) the illnesses that plague him and what he can and cannot do about them, and about his own existence. His life as a Buddhist monk in a remote jungle abode is not incidental to the philosophy he expounds: the two are different aspects of the same thing, namely a vision that penetrates into the human situation both as universal and as particular, and recognises that it is this situation which it is the business of each of us to resolve for ourselves. In presenting this view Ñāṇavīra Thera offers a contemporary exposition of the Teaching of the Buddha. In living this view he evokes a dramatic situation wherein an individual resolutely faces those questions which every lucid person must eventually face. The letters are in language, idiom and quotations from a galaxy of thinkers such as Camus, Heidegger, Kierkegaard, Sartre, Kafka. Though familiar to a Western reader, it can be incomprehensible in part, to anyone without such background.

Most of the editorial work connected with Ñāṇavīra Thera's writings was performed by Sāmanera Bodhesako (Robert Smith), who died in Kathmandu in 1988. During the last years of his life in Sri Lanka he founded Path Press which published Clearing the Path: Writings of Ñāṇavīra Thera (1960–1965). He also worked as editor for the Buddhist Publication Society in Kandy which published The Tragic, The Comic & The Personal: Selected Letters of Ñánavíra Thera (Wheel 339/341) in 1987. Prof. Forrest Williams of the University of Colorado also participated as the co-editor of Clearing the Path. It is now out of print. The Buddhist Cultural Centre decided to issue it in its two constituent parts, Notes on Dhamma and Letters.

=== Correspondents ===
The receivers of Ven. Nanavira's letters which are available were:

- Ven. Kheminda Thera – 1964,
- Ven. Ñānamoli – 1945–1960,
- Sister Vajirā – 1961–1962,
- Mr. N. Q. Dias – 1962,
- Mrs. Irene Quittner – 1964,
- Mr. Wijerama – 1964,
- Dr. M. R. de Silva – 1961–1964,
- Mr. R. G. de S. Wettimuny – 1962,
- the Honourable Lionel Samaratunga – 1963–1965,
- Mr. Ananda Pereira – 1964–1965,
- Mr. Robert Brady – 1964–1965,
- Mr. G. – 1964.

=== Paṭiccasamuppāda ===
According to Nanavira Thera, Paṭiccasamuppāda does not refer to a chain of events. This has been criticised by Bhikkhu Bodhi. On the other hand, Buddhadasa took the same stance on Paṭiccasamuppāda, and multiple scholars have noted inconsistencies in the Paṭiccasamuppāda, concluding that it is a composite of several older lists, which were reinterpreted as pointing to rebirth. (Note: Shulman refers to Schmithausen (2000), Zur Zwölfgliedrigen Formel des Entstehens in Abhängigkeit, in Horin: Vergleichende Studien zur Japanischen Kultur, 7)

== Published books ==
English:

- Notes on Dhamma, Path Press Publications, 2009, ISBN 9789460900013
- Letters to Sister Vajirā, Path Press Publications, 2010, ISBN 9789460900020
- Clearing the Path, Path Press, 1987 (out of print)
- Clearing the Path, Path Press Publications, 2011, ISBN 9789460900044
- Seeking the Path, Path Press Publications, 2011, ISBN 9789460900037
- The Tragic, the Comic, and Personal, BPS, 1987, ISBN 978-955-24-0000-1
- Mindfulness and Awareness, BPS, 1973

German:

- Notizen zu Dhamma, Verlag Beyerlein-Steinschulte, ISBN 978-3-931095-63-5

About Ven Ñāṇavīra:

- The Hermit of Būndala, by Bhikkhu H. Ñāṇasuci, Path Press Publications, 2014, ISBN 978-94-6090-008-2

== See also ==
- Nyanatiloka Mahathera
- Nyanaponika Thera
- Ñāṇamoli Bhikkhu
- Samanera Bodhesako
- Island Hermitage
- Path Press
- Buddhist Publication Society
- Buddhist Cultural Centre

== Sources ==
- Bucknell, Roderick S. (1999), "Conditioned Arising Evolves: Variation and Change in Textual Accounts of the Paṭiccasamuppāda Doctrine", Journal of the International Association of Buddhist Studies, 22 (2)
- Frauwallner, Erich (1973), "Chapter 5. The Buddha and the Jina", History of Indian Philosophy: The philosophy of the Veda and of the epic. The Buddha and the Jina. The Sāmkhya and the classical Yoga-system, Motilal Banarsidass
- Gombrich, Richard (2009), "Chaper 9. Causation and non-random process", What the Buddha Thought, Equinox
- Jurewicz, Joanna (2000), "Playing with Fire: The pratityasamutpada from the perspective of Vedic thought" (PDF), Journal of the Pali Text Society, 26: 77–103
- Ñāṇavīra Thera (2003) [1988], Clearing the Path: Writings of Ñāṇavīra Thera (1960–1965), Path Press, ISBN 978-955-9032-00-7
- A Critical Examination of Ñāṇavīra Thera’s "A Note on Paṭiccasamuppāda" – Bhikkhu Bodhi
- Schumann, Hans Wolfgang (1974), Buddhism: an outline of its teachings and schools, Theosophical Pub. House
- Schumann, Hans Wolfgang (1997) [1976], Boeddhisme. Stichter, scholen, systemen (Buddhismus - Stifter, Schulen und Systeme), Asoka
- Shulman, Eviatar (2008), "Early Meanings of Dependent-Origination", Journal of Indian Philosophy, 36 (2): 297–317, doi:10.1007/s10781-007-9030-8, S2CID 59132368
- Wayman, Alex (1971), "Buddhist Dependent Origination", History of Religions, 10 (3): 185–203, doi:10.1086/462628, JSTOR 1062009, S2CID 161507469
- Wayman, Alex (1984), "Dependent Origination - the Indo-Tibetan Vision", Buddhist Insight: Essays, Motilal Banarsidass, ISBN 978-81-208-0675-7
- Wayman, Alex (1990) [1984], "The Intermediate-State Dispute in Buddhism", Buddhist Insight: Essays, Motilal Banarsidass, ISBN 978-81-208-0675-7
