= Rajguru Aggavamsa Mahathera =

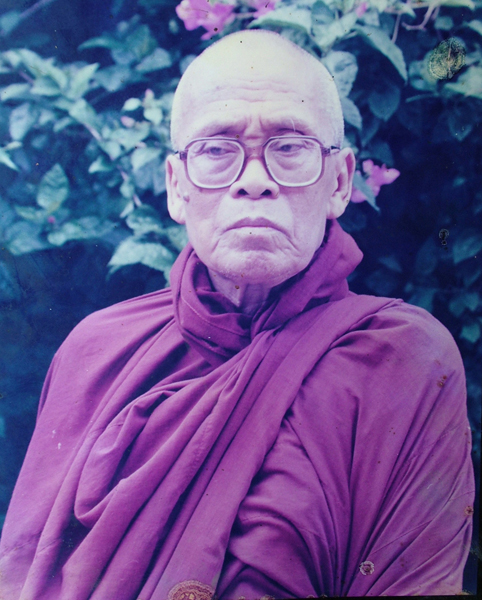
- Venerable Rajguru Aggavamsa Mahathera
- Title: Tipitaka Visaradha; Aggamahasadhammajatikadajja founder of Parbatya Bhikkhu Sangha

Personal life
- Born: November 23, 1913 Kutubdia, Chittagong Hill Tracts, British India
- Died: January 5, 2008 (aged 94) Rangamati Bangladesh

Religious life
- Religion: Buddhism
- School: Theravada

Senior posting
- Teacher: Ven. Tissa Mahathera

Rajguru Aggavamsa Mahathera was one of the delegates from Bangladesh) in the Sixth Buddhist council held in Yangon, Burma in 1956.

== Boyhood ==
Most venerable Ashin Aggavamsa Sayadaw, Sanghãraja, Aggamahãsaddhammajotikãdhaja, President, and founder of Parbatya Bhikkhu was, was born at Kutubadia village in the Chittagong Hill Tracts on 23 November 1913. father's lay father's name was Rudrasingh Mahajan and mother Mrs. Icchavati Tanchangya. His given name of a lay boy was Phulanath Tanchangya, and he went to school as a boy when he was young at Rainkhong Kutubdia Christian School, Rangunia High School, and Koya Para High School.

== Ordination and studying Tipitaka literature ==
He renounced his home, wife, son and daughter and took ordination at the Lord Abbot of Bawgaltali Buddhist temple, Venerable Tissa Mahathera during the full moon day of Vesakha in 1939. And he received his higher ordination under the preceptor Lord abbot of Bawgaltali Buddhist temple the same of his novice preceptor in 1942 in the full moon day of Vesakha. Then his preceptor given the name of Venerable Agga Vaṃsa Bhikkhu.

Then after a few months of his receiving of his higher ordination, he left Bawgaltali Buddhist temple and received as a preceptor of the staying monk at Chittagong eminent in Tipitaka and the teacher of Vipassanā, Venerable Ananda Mitra and started to learn Tipitaka Doctrine and Vipassana meditation. Under the Lord Abbot of Ranguniya Icchamati Dathu Ceti Complex, Late Venerable Dharma Nanda Mahathera, he received education and training from beginner level to higher level. He followed his preceptor and meditated in the depth of the jungle by solidarity in each mountain at Kutubdiya Village.

== Studies in Myanmar ==
In the year 1947 on 15 June he came to Rangoon (Yangon), Myanmar for higher education of Buddhist Literature and to learn meditation. He obtained M.A. degree in Buddhist philosophy. He has been honoured as “Vinaya Visaradha” by the Let Perhang University and Kamaihada University in Burma. He took training on Vipassana meditation in internationally famous Vipassana Bhavana centre at Mahasi Vipassana centre for 5 month and honoured as Vipassana Acharya. He spent 10 years in Rangoon and became a scholar of Theravada Buddhism. He worked in the protocol section of Sixth Buddhist Council from 1954 to 1956. He studied Tipitaka literature for 12 years.

== Return from Myanmar ==
After attending in the Sixth Buddhist Council went back to Bangladesh in 1958. And the king later by holding grand ceremony received as the Chakma Patriarch in Raj vihar in Rangamati. On 26 December 1957 he returned to his motherland. In the year 1958 on the request of the Chakma Raja Tridev Roy, he became the Lord Abbot of Raj Vihara and honoured as CHAKMA RAJGURU, unprecedented in the Chittagong Hill Tracts.

== Disciples ==
He had good number of disciples, among them Jyotipal Mahathera (Arunachal Pradesh), Tilaka Nanda Mahathera now president of Parbatya Bhikku Sangha, Prabarananda Mahathera (Subalong), Sumana Nanda Mahathera (Chengi), Subhachar Thera and many others. He had given the name Sadhana Nanda at the time of Upasampada to most renowned Buddhist Monk Sadhanananda Mahathera popularly known as VANA BHANTE.

== Works ==
At that time situation was different. The people were confused on Buddhism represented by the illiterate Rauli Monk influenced by Tantricism. He began to work for the revival of Theravada Buddhism, Buddhist culture and education. Rajguru Aggavamsa Mahathera moved from village to village, preaching Theravada Buddhism. He brought waves on Buddhist culture amongst the people. He re-established Kathina Civara Dana Ceremony, Buddha Puja, in a manner followed by the ancient Buddhist and continued efforts a great social and religious revival took place in the Chittagong Hill Tracts.

== Books ==
He wrote some dozen books on Buddhism, namely:

- Manab Dharma Pancasil published on 2004.
- Stop Genocide in Chittagong Hill Tract. 1981. Calcutta.
- Sramanera Kartabya, published on 1977.
- Buddha Pasana (Lokuttara), published on 1982
- Buddha Pasana ( Lokiya), published on 1984.
- Samavaya Buddha Passana, published on 1858.
- Buddha Ponjika, published on 1961.
- Parinam(drama), published on 1972.
- Mangla Sutra in Chakma lyric, published on 1972.
- Buddha Samantika, published on 2008.
- Abhidhammattha Sanghaha unpublished
- Buddha O Rabindranath unpublished
- Dharma O Sawmaj unpublished
- Dharshan O Vidharshan unpublished
- Maha Manab Gautama Buddha unpublished
- Buddhawr Awbawdan(3 Volumes) unpublished

== Honours ==
He has been honoured as “Tipitaka Visaradha” by the Sangha Raja Bhikkhu Mahasabha of Chittagong. He has represented in the 3rd world Buddhist conference from Chittagong Hill Tracts. He became Mahathera on 9 April 1965. He founded Boudha Juba Sangha, Arjyapur M.E School, now Kangra Churi High School, Bagal Toli Boudha Vihar, Rainkhong Kutubdia Boudha Vihar, “The Buddhist Mission” “The Parvattya Chattagram Buddha Samity”. He was founder president of Parbatya Bhikkhu Sangha in Chittagong Hill Tracts in 1958. He came to India in the year 1979 and visited religious Buddhist Centre in India. Ven. Dharama Pala Mahathera Lord Abbot of Dharamankur Boudha Vihara has extended hearty welcome. He founded The Buddhist Mission at Kolkata with the help of Sri Gopal Bhusan Chakma, eminent social worker at Bagoihati, Kolkata. He was honoured as a PANDIT by the Calcutta University. He was appointed as a visiting professor of Pali literature, and also as an external examiner of PhD thesis of the Calcutta University. In the year 1986, Ven. Vimal Tissa Mahathera came to India and met with Ven Rajguru at Kolkata. Ven. Rajguru shared his experience, guidance, and gave moral support to Ven. Vimal Tissa Mahathera. Both together with the association of eminent Chakma living in Kolkata founded the great institution “Shishu Koruna Sangha” in the year 1986. He also the founder of Shisu Karuna Sangha(Bodhicariya) with his disciple Venerable Vimal Tissa in Kolkata, India. Because of his contribution for his reformation in the society' He was honoured with the honourable title of Aggamahasadhammajatikadajja in 2004 at the Maha pasana cave, Yangon, Myanmar by the Myanmar Government.

== Return from India ==
He always has a strong feeling for his motherland in Chittagong Hill Tracts, Bangladesh. Due to old age, he was suffering from diseases. Due to the political turmoil of Bangladesh, he had left for India in 1977. After staying in India for many year, he started his journey on 19 January 2001 to travel from India to Bangladesh. Venerable Vimal Tissa Mahathera had made all necessary arrangement. Prajananda Mahathera, the Lord Abbot of Shakkya Muni Buddha Vihar, Dhaka extended all necessary assistance. He later went to Rangamati at the request of Chakma Raja Devasish Roy.

== Buddhist activities ==
He had participated in the All India Bhikkhu conference held at Bodh Gaya in the year 1973 where he had presided one day in the conference. He had also participated in a 3 days conference at Mahabodhi Society Hall, Kolkata in the same year. He attended in the International Buddhist Conference held in Nepal in the year 1977. In the year 1982 he had attended human Rights Conference in the Netherlands and presented his speech on the inhuman torture by the military to the mass tribal people of Chittagong Hill Tracts. He was invited by the United Nations Economic and Social Council, Geneva on 29 July- 2 August 1985, Commission on Human Rights on Minorities Working Group on Indigenous people. He utilized the opportunity to focus the plight and sufferings of the people of Chittagong Hill Tracts. He visited United Kingdom, Germany, Netherlands, Switzerland, France, Thailand, Sri Lanka, Nepal and many other countries, and preached humanity, international brotherhood and world peace. He established relationship with a number of Internationals Organization such as World Fellowship of Buddhists in Thailand, Mahabodhi Society of India, Kalinga Nippon Buddhist Sangha in Japan, Union Buddha Sasana Council in Burma, The Young Men's Buddhist Association in Sri Lanka, The Burma Buddhist World Mission Myanmar, Buddhist Society in United Kingdom and All India Bengal Buddhist Association in India.

== Death ==
At the age of 94 years old, he died on Saturday at 9 pm (BST) 5 January 2008 at Raj Vihar, Rangamati, Bangladesh.
