= Rerukane Chandawimala Thera =

Sri Lankan Buddhist monk and author

- Most Venerable Rerukane Chandawimala Maha Nayaka Thera
- Title: Maha Nayaka of Swegin Chapter; Professor of Abhidharma; Sahithya Chakrawarthi; Pravachana Visharada

Personal life
- Born: Rubel Gunawardhana; 19 July 1897 Rerukana, Kalutara District
- Died: 4 July 1997 (aged 99) Pokunuwita, Kalutara District
- Education: Burmese Buddhist monastic education

Religious life
- Religion: Buddhism
- School: Theravada
- Lineage: Swegin Chapter, Amarapura Nikaya

Senior posting
- Teacher: U. Vinayalankara Thera

Rerukane Chandawimala Thera (Pali spelling: Chandavimala) was a Sri Lankan Buddhist monk and author. A personality of Sri Lankan Buddhism in the 20th century, he has been regarded as one of the finest scholars of Tripitaka, the sacred canon of Theravada Buddhism. He was also a Buddhist meditation master, professor of Abhidharma and a former Maha Nayaka of the Swegin Chapter of the Amarapura Nikaya. Rerukane Chandawimala Thera was a highly reputed author of Theravada Buddhism, especially on Abhidharma. His books are considered as text books by other authors as well as students.

== Early life and education ==
Rerukane Chandawimala Thera was born on 19 July 1897 in the Rerukana village in Kalutara District, western Sri Lanka. His lay name was Rubel Gunawardene. The eldest of a family of six children, Rubel's parents were Don Bastian de Paules Gunawardene and Munasinghage Podi Nona. After having his school education at Veediyagoda school up to grade 2, young Rubel entered the order of Buddhist monks as a Samanera (novice monk) on 8 January 1906. His teacher was Burmese Buddhist monk U. Vinayalankara Maha Thera who resided in Pokunuwita Temple those days.

Rerukane Chandawimala Samanera left Sri Lanka on 27 January 1908 to receive his monastic education in Burma. After having monastic education for 10 years he received his higher ordination Upasampada on 26 October 1917 at ‘’Dhammikarama Seema Malaka’’ in Burma. During his stay in Burma, Rerukane Chandawimala Thera had a good education on Tripitka, specially on Abhidharma (Buddhist philosophy) and Buddhist meditation. Rerukane Chandawimala Thera returned to Sri Lanka in 1918.

== Work and honours ==
Rerukane Chandawimala Thera started writing books at the age of 29. His first book was ‘’Niravana Vinishchaya’’ (Judging the Enlightenment). He soon became the Chief Prelate of the Pokunuwita Temple and thereafter devoted his entire time for meditation, Buddhist literary works and to solve the problems on Buddhist philosophy presented to him by the other monks and laity. He authored more than 30 highly reputed books on Buddhism. His work on Abhidharma and Vipassana mediation gained him high respect and reputation. Chandawimala Thera also served as a master and instructor to his students as well as others who were interested in Buddhist meditation.

Rerukane Chandawimala Thera received lot of honorary titles and degrees for his service to the Buddhism. He received the honorary degree of ‘’Sahithya Chakarawarthi’’ (Emperor of Literature) from Vidyalankara University in 1963. Vidyalankara University also offered him the honorary post of professor of Abhidharma. In addition to those degrees he also received the Panditha degree conferred by the ‘’Pracheena Bhashopakara Samagama’’. Rerukane Chandawimala Thera became the Mahanayaka of Sri Lanka Swegin Chapter of the Amarapura Nikaya in 1976. In 1995, he received the titles ‘’Pravachana Visharda’’ and Amarapura Maha Mahopadyaya Shasana Sobhana at the age of 98.

== Death and funeral ==
Rerukane Chandawimala Thera died on 4 July 1997, due to natural causes at his temple in Pokunuwita at age 99. His funeral was done according to the last will and the instructions he has given to his pupils in the early 1980s. Maha Nayaka Thera requested for no state funeral, no publicity in the media, no banners, no ringing of his temple bell and stated that all he had wanted was for his body be cremated within the temple premises, with no coffin. He also requested not to keep his body more than 24 hours after his death and his funeral was conducted according to his last will and instructions in a very simple manner. Rerukane Chandawimala Thera had used a rough wooden bed to sleep on and his bodily remains was carried on an equally rough wooden structure and cremated in a rough wood pyre, bereft of any decoration. Rerukane Chandawimala Thera was the Maha Nayaka of the Swegin Chapter of Amarapura Nikaya for a period of over two decades from 1976 until his death in 1997.

== Books (selection) ==
The following are all the 27 books written by Rerukane Chandawimala Maha Thera.

1. බෞද්ධයාගේ අත්පොත (The Buddhist's Handbook)
2. චතුරාර්ය සත්‍යය (The Four Noble Truths)
3. පටිච්ච සමුප්පාද විවරණය - Paṭicca Samuppāda Vivaraṇaya(An Explanation of Dependent Origination)
4. අභිධර්ම මාර්ගය (The Path of Abhidhamma)
5. අභිධර්මයේ මූලික කරුණු (Basic Principles of Abhidhamma)
6. පුණ්‍යෝපදේශය - Punyopadeshaya(Guidance on Meritorious Deeds)
7. නිර්වාණ විනිශ්චය හා පුනරුත්පත්ති ක්‍රමය (An analysis of Nibbana and the Method of Rebirth)
8. ධර්ම විනිශ්චය (An analysis of Dhamma / Dhamma Judgement)
9. පාරමිතා ප්‍රකරණය (An analysis the Perfections)
10. බෝධිපාක්ෂික ධර්ම විස්තරය (The Explanation of the Factors of Enlightenment)
11. බුද්ධ නීති සංග්‍රහය - Buddha Neethi Sangrahaya (Compendium of the Buddha's Principles)
12. බෝධි පූජාව - Bodhi Puja (Offering to the Bodhi Tree)
13. පොහොය දිනය (The Poya Day)
14. මංගල ධර්ම විස්තරය (The Explanation of the Auspicious Blessings)
15. සූවිසි මහා ගුණය (The Twenty Four Great Virtues)
16. කෙලෙස් එක්දහස් පන්සියය (The 1500 Defilements)
17. වඤ්චක ධර්ම හා චිත්තෝපක්ලේශ ධර්ම (Deceptive Defilements and Defilements of the Mind)
18. සතිපට්ඨාන භාවනා විවේචනය සහ තවත් කෘති (Analysis of Satipatthana Meditation)
19. සතිපට්ඨාන භාවනා ක්‍රමය (The Method of Satipatthana Meditation)
20. චත්තාළීසාකාර මහා විපස්සනා භාවනාව (The Great Forty Aspect Vipassana Meditation)
21. විදර්ශනා භාවනා ක්‍රමය (The Method of Insight Meditation)
22. උභය ප්‍රාතිමෝක්ෂය - Ubaya Pratimokshaya (The Twofold Patimokkha)
23. විනය කර්ම පොත (Manual of Vinaya Procedures)
24. උපසම්පදා ශීලය (The Higher Ordination Precepts)
25. ශාසනාවතරණය (Compendium of Bhikkhu Vinaya)
26. පට්ඨාන මහා ප්‍රකරණ සන්නය (Commentary on the Great Patthana Treatise)
27. අනුවාද සහිත අභිධර්මාර්ථ සංග්‍රහය (Abhidhammattha Sangaha with Translation)
