= Mithra Wettimuny =

Sri Lankan cricketer (1951–2019)

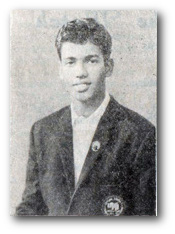

Personal information
- Full name: Mithra de Silva Wettimuny
- Born: 11 July 1951; Colombo
- Died: 20 January 2019 (aged 67); Colombo
- Batting: Right-handed

International information
- National side: Sri Lanka (1983)
- Test debut (cap 22): 4 March 1983 v New Zealand
- Last Test: 11 March 1983 v New Zealand
- Only ODI (cap 31): 2 March 1983 v New Zealand

Career statistics
Competition	Test	ODI	FC	LA
Matches	2	1	9	3
Runs scored	28	2	268	49
Batting average	7.00	2.00	17.86	16.33
100s/50s	0/0	0/0	0/1	0/0
Top score	17	2	55	46
Catches/stumpings	2/–	0/–	7/–	0/–
- Source: Cricinfo, 24 January 2019

Mithra de Silva Wettimuny (11 June 1951 – 20 January 2019) was a Sri Lankan cricketer who played in two Test matches and one One Day International (ODI) in 1983.

== Family ==
He was one of three brothers to represent Sri Lanka (all opening batsmen). His elder brother Sunil played in the 1975 and 1979 Cricket World Cups while his youngest brother Sidath scored Sri Lanka's first Test match hundred.

== International career ==
Wettimuny originally came to prominence as captain of the successful Ceylon Schools team which toured India in 1969/70, a team which included future Test captains Bandula Warnapura and Duleep Mendis. Sri Lanka gained Test status in 1982, and by then in his early thirties, Wettimuny's entire first-class cricket career incorporated nine matches in four countries in 127 days. His highest score was 55 on debut against Zimbabwe at Bulawayo in November 1982. He made his Test debut against New Zealand on 4 March 1983. He scored 17 and five runs in the two innings, respectively, in a match that New Zealand won by an innings and 25 runs.
