= Sunil Wettimuny =

Sri Lankan cricketer (born 1949)

Personal information
- Full name: Sunil Ramsay de Silva Wettimuny
- Born: 2 February 1949 (age 77); Colombo, Sri Lanka
- Batting: Right-handed
- Bowling: Right-arm medium
- Role: Wicket keeper
- Relatives: Sidath Wettimuny (brother); Mithra Wettimuny (brother)

International information
- National side: Sri Lanka (1975–1979)
- ODI debut (cap 12): 11 January 1975 v Australia
- Last ODI: 16 June 1979 v India

Career statistics
Competition	ODI	FC	LA
Matches	3	39	12
Runs scored	136	1,693	405
Batting average	68.00	24.53	40.50
100s/50s	0/2	2/10	0/4
Top score	67	121	69
Balls bowled	–	111	–
Wickets	–	1	–
Bowling average	–	49.00	–
5 wickets in innings	–	0	–
10 wickets in match	–	0	–
Best bowling	–	1/10	0/–
Catches/stumpings	0/–	17/1	4/-0
- Source: Cricinfo, 3 September 2015

Sunil Ramsay de Silva Wettimuny (born 2 February 1949), or Sunil Wettimuny, is a Sri Lankan former cricketer who played three One Day International (ODI) matches in the Cricket World Cup tournaments of 1975 and 1979 as an opening batsman.

Sunil is the elder brother of two other Sri Lankan cricketers, Mithra and Sidath. After his cricketing career ended, he became a commercial pilot. He was the pilot of the special flight which brought the 1996 World Cup winning team from Lahore, in Pakistan, to Sri Lanka.
