= Samanera Bodhesako =

American Theravada Buddhist monk (1939–1988)

Sāmanera Bodhesako
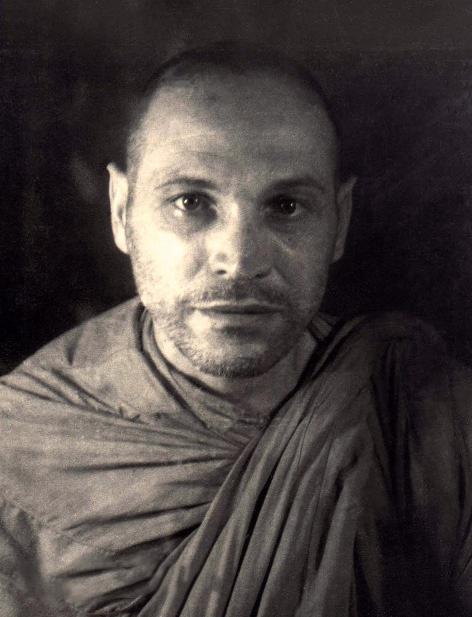

Personal life
- Born: Robert Smith; 1939 Detroit, Michigan, United States
- Died: 1988 (aged 48–49) Kathmandu, Nepal
- Other names: Vinayadhara, Ñāṇasuci

Religious life
- Religion: Theravada

Senior posting
- Teacher: Ñāṇavīra Thera
- Website: www.nanavira.org www.pathpress.org

Sāmanera Bodhesako (born Robert Smith, 1939–1988; known also as Ven. Vinayadhara and Ven. Ñāṇasuci in his early monastic life) was an American Buddhist monk. Born in Detroit, Michigan, in 1939, he studied at the University of Iowa, specializing in Literature and Creative Writing. He embraced Buddhism in 1966 in India, where he was ordained at the Bengal Buddhist Association of Calcutta, and spent several years as a monk in Island Hermitage and elsewhere in Sri Lanka. (His autobiography of his early monastic life can be found in the book called Getting Off: A Portrait.) After taking off the robe in 1971, in 1980 he again took ordination, this time in Thailand under the Venerable Somdet Ñāṇasamvara (Supreme Patriarch of Thailand) of Wat Bovornives. In 1982 he returned to Sri Lanka, living mostly in the upcountry region of Bandarawela. In 1988, while on a return journey to the United States to join his father for the latter's eightieth birthday celebration, Bodhesako died from a sudden intestinal hernia while in Kathmandu.

During the last years of his life he founded the Path Press for which he edited Clearing the Path: Writings of Ñāṇavīra Thera (Colombo, 1987). For the BPS he edited The Tragic, the comic and the Personal: Selected Letters of Ñāṇavīra Thera (Wheel Publication series No. 339–41, 1987.) In 2008 BPS published Beginnings: Collected Essays by S. Bodhesako. This book contains all the known published and unpublished essays by S. Bodhesako: Beginnings, Change, The Buddha and Catch-22, The Myth of Sisyphus, Faith, and Being and Craving.

== Work ==
Editor

- Clearing the Path - The Writings of Ñāṇavīra Thera

Writings

- Beginnings: Collected Essays by S. Bodhesako

- Change - An examination of impermanence in experience. Published in 1988 printed by Karunaratne & Sons (Pvt) Ltd, Colombo.
- Beginnings: The Pali Suttas - Discussion of beginnings of Pali Canon. Published in 1987 in the Wheel Publication series No. 313–315 by the BPS.
- Faith: A Meditation and a Homily
- The Buddha and Catch-22 Published in 1987 by the BPS in the Bodhi Leaves series as No. 110.
- The Myth of Sisyphus: A Cycle
- Being and Craving

- - Autobiography
- Stringhoppers and Rabbitholes - Collected letters

Translation

- Dhammapada in English Verse

Published Work

- Getting Off, A Portrait of an American Buddhist Monk, Path Press Publications, 2012, ISBN 9789460900051
- Stringhoppers and Rabbitholes, Letters of a Wayfarer, Path Press Publications, 2013, ISBN 9789460900068
- Change - An examination of impermanence in experience. Published in 1988 by Path Press, Colombo.
- Beginnings: The Pali Suttas - Discussion of beginnings of Pali Canon. Published in 1987 in the Wheel Publication series No. 313–315 by the BPS.
- The Buddha and Catch-22 Published in 1987 by the BPS in the Bodhi Leaves series as No. 110.
