= Buddhist Cultural Centre =

Buddhist Cultural Centre (BCC) in Sri Lanka was founded by Ven. Kirama Wimalajhoti Thera who had returned to Sri Lanka after twenty years of dedicated missionary activity in Malaysia, Singapore and US. It was inaugurated on January 2, 1992 under the auspices of Ven. Dr. K. Sri Dhammananda Thera, the chief prelate of Malaysia and Singapore and a plethora of other internationally famed Buddhist scholar monks of the time. It sought to fill a need of the devoted Buddhists in Sri Lanka and the rest of the world. What made Ven. Wimalajhoti Thera start the BCC was the dearth of Buddhist publications in Sri Lanka notwithstanding its reputation as a country where Buddhism prevails in its pristine form. This fact was pointed to Ven. Wimalajhoti Thera by some of his foreign neophytes who had arrived in Sri Lanka to learn Buddhism when they had strolled quite unsuccessfully all over the outskirts of Colombo along with him in search of some Buddhist publications.

The BCC first began on a small scale purporting to dispense the Dhamma among Buddhist devotees, expanded with time through the dedication of Ven. Wimalajhoti Thera. By now, it has arguably become the world’s largest Theravada Buddhist book collection. It dispenses not only Dhamma books, but also other items venerated and frequently used by Buddhists such as images of the Buddha, requisites of Buddhist monks (Atapirikara), incense sticks and meditation cushions, etc.

In 1993 a meditation centre was set up on a 20-acre mountainous plateau amidst a salubrious sylvan environment as the first appendage to be added to the BCC network. It is situated in Dekanduwala, Horana about 30 km away from Colombo. It has residential facilities and provides training in meditation for both local and foreign nationals since 1994. Among the programs it conducted, the two-week temporary ordination for young people carried out in 2003 became particularly popular. The training in Dhamma and meditation has also been provided for nuns both local and foreign since 2002. The management and execution of the training programs thereof are done by fifteen fully ordained bhikkhunīs. So far around 2000 foreigners have been trained by the centre besides local participants and nuns. This meditation centre is soon to be converted into a "Bhikkhunī Training Centre" equipped for training prospective nuns, which is to be affiliated to the BCC and is to be divested of government support.

In 1995 a printing press was amalgamated to the BCC to print and publish ancient but extant and rare Sinhala Dhamma treatises. In the same year, a mobile bookshop was launched to make the Dhamma books accessible particularly to those who live in rural areas and to promote the reading habit among the general populace.

In 2002 a branch of the BCC was started in the airport at the departure/transit lounge which was designated "Food for the Mind". It serves to disseminate Dhamma among interested foreigners and locals.

In 2011, the Sambuddhatva Jayanthi Mandiraya was constructed in central Colombo to commemorate the 2,600th anniversary of the advent of Buddhism. The 16-storey building includes an auditorium used for conferences, seminars, and convocations. It also houses a bookshop operated by the BCC at Nedimala, Dehiwala, which contains a large collection of Buddhist literature.

The Mandiraya functions as a centre for Buddhist activities, hosting seminars, classes on topics such as meditation, and correspondence courses in Buddhism. In addition, it offers instruction in local and foreign languages and provides a Buddhist counselling service.

BCC since its induction in 1992, it has the following achievements to its credit:

- Making available Buddhist books that are in print to the scholar and the ordinary Buddhist devotee.
- Printing and publishing ancient, hardly extant Dhamma treatises.
- Printing and publishing the whole Buddha Jayanthi Tripitaka set which was largely construed as a government venture.
- Printing and publishing commentaries (Attakatha) in Pali and Sinhala.
- Printing and publishing some of the sub-commentaries (Tika) in Sinhala.
- Translation of some of the commentaries into English.
- Promoting meditation and the Buddhist way of life among the populace.
- Dispensing of Free Dhamma books.
- Making available various items frequently used by Buddhists such as images, lamps, posters and requisites of a monk (atapirikar), etc.
- All the activities connected with the Sambuddhatva Jayanthi Mandiraya.
- Numerous social services as providing a building for the Tangalle Hospital and an auditorium for a school in Kirama.
- Promoting Buddhism in English by publishing a series of books for students of International schools.

On January 1, 2008, Buddhist Cultural Center launched its online bookshop with worldwide shipping options.
