= Pre-sectarian Buddhism =

Form of early Buddhism

Pre-sectarian Buddhism, also called early Buddhism, the earliest Buddhism, original Buddhism, and primitive Buddhism, is Buddhism as theorised to have existed before the various early Buddhist schools developed, around 250 BCE (followed by later subsects of Buddhism).

The contents and teachings of this pre-sectarian Buddhism must be deduced or re-constructed from the earliest Buddhist texts, which by themselves are already sectarian. (Note: Leon Hurvitz: "...stressed that the written canon in Buddhism is sectarian from the outset, and that presectarian Buddhism must be deduced from the writings as they now exist." (quote via Google Scholar search-engine)) (Note: J. W. de Jong: "It would be hypocritical to assert that nothing can be said about the doctrine of earliest Buddhism [...] the basic ideas of Buddhism found in the canonical writings could very well have been proclaimed by him [the Buddha], transmitted and developed by his disciples and, finally, codified in fixed formulas.") (Note: A. K. Warder: "...a reconstruction of the original Buddhism presupposed by the traditions of the different schools known to us.") The whole subject remains intensely debated by scholars, not all of whom believe a meaningful reconstruction is possible.

"Early Buddhism" may also be used for considerably later periods.

== Name ==
Various terms are being used to refer to the earliest period of Buddhism:

- "Pre-sectarian Buddhism"
- "Early Buddhism",
- "The earliest Buddhism",
- "Original Buddhism",
- "The Buddhism of the Buddha himself." (Note: This kernel of doctrine is presumably common Buddhism of the period "before the schisms of the fourth and third centuries BC. It may be substantially the Buddhism of the Buddha himself.")
- Precanonical Buddhism
- Primitive Buddhism

Some Japanese scholars refer to the subsequent period of the early Buddhist schools as sectarian Buddhism.

== Timespan ==
The Mahajanapadas were sixteen most powerful and vast kingdoms and republics around the lifetime of Gautama Buddha, located mainly across the fertile Indo-Gangetic plains. There were also a number of smaller kingdoms stretching the length and breadth of Ancient India.

Pre-sectarian Buddhism may refer to the earliest Buddhism, the ideas and practices of Gautama Buddha himself. It may also refer to early Buddhism as existing until the first documented split in the sangha. According to Lambert Schmithausen, it is "the canonical period prior to the development of different schools with their different positions."

Contrary to the claim of doctrinal stability, early Buddhism was a dynamic movement. Pre-sectarian Buddhism may have included or incorporated other Śramaṇic schools of thought, (Note: See also Atthakavagga and Parayanavagga#Interpretation as heterodox.) as well as Vedic and Jain ideas and practices.

The period of "Early Buddhism" in the sense of pre-sectarian Buddhism is considered by scholars such as Paul J. Griffiths and Steven Collins to be from the time of the historical Buddha to the reign of Ashoka (c. 268 to 232 BCE). The first documented split occurred, according to most scholars, between the second Buddhist council and the third Buddhist council. Lamotte and Hirakawa both maintain that the first schism in the Buddhist sangha occurred during the reign of Ashoka. According to scholar Collett Cox, "most scholars would agree that even though the roots of the earliest recognised groups predate Aśoka, their actual separation did not occur until after his death."

The first post-schismatic groups are often stated to be the Sthavira Nikāya and the Mahāsāṃghika. (Note: Collett Cox: "Virtually all later sources agree that the first schism within the early Buddhist community occurred with the separation of the Mahasamghika school, or 'those of the great community,' from the remaining monks referred to as Sthaviras, or the 'elders'.") Eventually, eighteen different schools came into existence. The later Mahayana schools may have preserved ideas which were abandoned by the "orthodox" Theravada, such as the Three Bodies doctrine, the idea of consciousness (vijñāna) as a continuum, and devotional elements such as the worship of saints. (Note: See also Atthakavagga and Parayanavagga.)

== Earliest Buddhism and the Śramaṇa movement ==
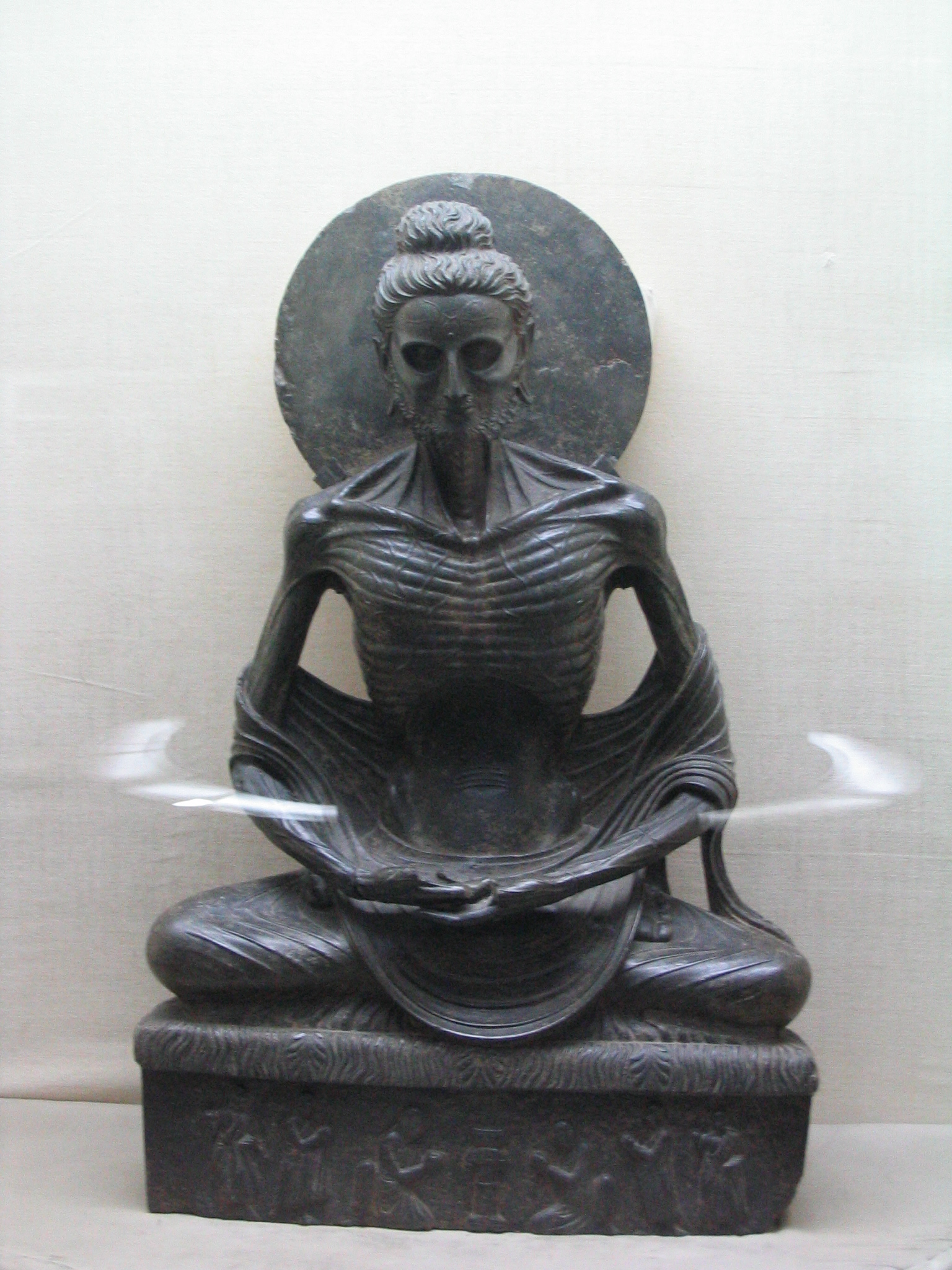
Siddartha Gautama depicted in Greco-Buddhist style during his extreme fasting prior to being Awakened. 2nd–3rd century, Gandhara (modern-day eastern Afghanistan), Lahore Museum, Pakistan.

Pre-sectarian Buddhism was originally one of the Śramaṇic movements. The time of the Buddha was a time of urbanisation in India, and saw the growth of the śramaṇas, wandering philosophers that had rejected the authority of Vedas and Brahmanic priesthood, intent on escaping saṃsāra through various means, which involved ascetic practices, and ethical behavior.

The śramaṇas gave rise to different religious and philosophical schools, among which the most important included pre-sectarian Buddhism itself, Yoga, and similar schools of Hinduism, Jainism, Ājīvika, Ajñana, and Cārvāka. During this time, concepts that would become popular in all major Indian religions also emerged, such as saṃsāra (endless cycle of birth and death) and moksha (liberation from that cycle). (Note: Flood & Olivelle: "The second half of the first millennium BCE was the period that created many of the ideological and institutional elements that characterize later Indian religions. The renouncer tradition played a central role during this formative period of Indian religious history [...] Some of the fundamental values and beliefs that we generally associate with Indian religions in general and Hinduism in particular were in part the creation of the renouncer tradition. These include the two pillars of Indian theologies: samsara – the belief that life in this world is one of suffering and subject to repeated deaths and births (rebirth); moksha/nirvana – the goal of human existence.") Nevertheless, despite the success that these wandering philosophers and ascetics had obtained by spreading ideas and concepts that would soon be accepted by all religions of India, the orthodox schools of Hindu philosophy (āstika) opposed Śramaṇic schools of thought and refuted their doctrines as "heterodox" (nāstika), because they refused to accept the epistemic authority of Vedas.

The ideas of saṃsāra, karma and rebirth show a development of thought in Indian religions: from the idea of single existence, at the end of which one was judged and punished and rewarded for one's deeds, or karma; to multiple existences with reward or punishment in an endless series of existences; and then attempts to gain release from this endless series. This release was the central aim of the Śramaṇa movement. Vedic rituals, which aimed at entrance into heaven, may have played a role in this development: the realisation that those rituals did not lead to an everlasting liberation led to the search for other means.

== Scholarship and methodology ==
Earliest Buddhism can only be deduced from the various Buddhist canons now extant, which are all already sectarian collections. (Note: J. W. de Jong: "It would be hypocritical to assert that nothing can be said about the doctrine of earliest Buddhism [...] the basic ideas of Buddhism found in the canonical writings could very well have been proclaimed by him [the Buddha], transmitted and developed by his disciples and, finally, codified in fixed formulas.") As such any reconstruction is tentative. One method to obtain information on the oldest core of Buddhism is to compare the oldest extant versions of the Theravadin Pāli Canon, the surviving portions of the scriptures of Sarvastivada, Mulasarvastivada, Mahīśāsaka, Dharmaguptaka and other schools, and the Chinese āgamas and other surviving portions of other early canons (such as the Gandharan texts). (Note: Warder: "When we examine the Tripitakas of the eighteen schools, so far as they are extant, we find an agreement which is substantial, though not complete. Even the most conservative of the early schools seem to have added new texts to their collections. However, there is a central body of sutras (dialogues), in four groups, which is so similar in all known versions that we must accept these as so many recensions of the same original texts. These make up the greater part of the Sutra Pitaka.") (Note: Most of these non-Indian texts are only available in a Chinese translation, with the exception of some individual scriptures found in Nepal, which are composed in Sanskrit. The Gandhāran Buddhist texts were recovered from Afghanistan. The central body of sutras in these texts is so similar that they are considered to be different recensions of the same text.) Early proto-Mahayana texts which contain nearly identical material to that of the Pali Canon such as the Salistamba Sutra are also further evidence.

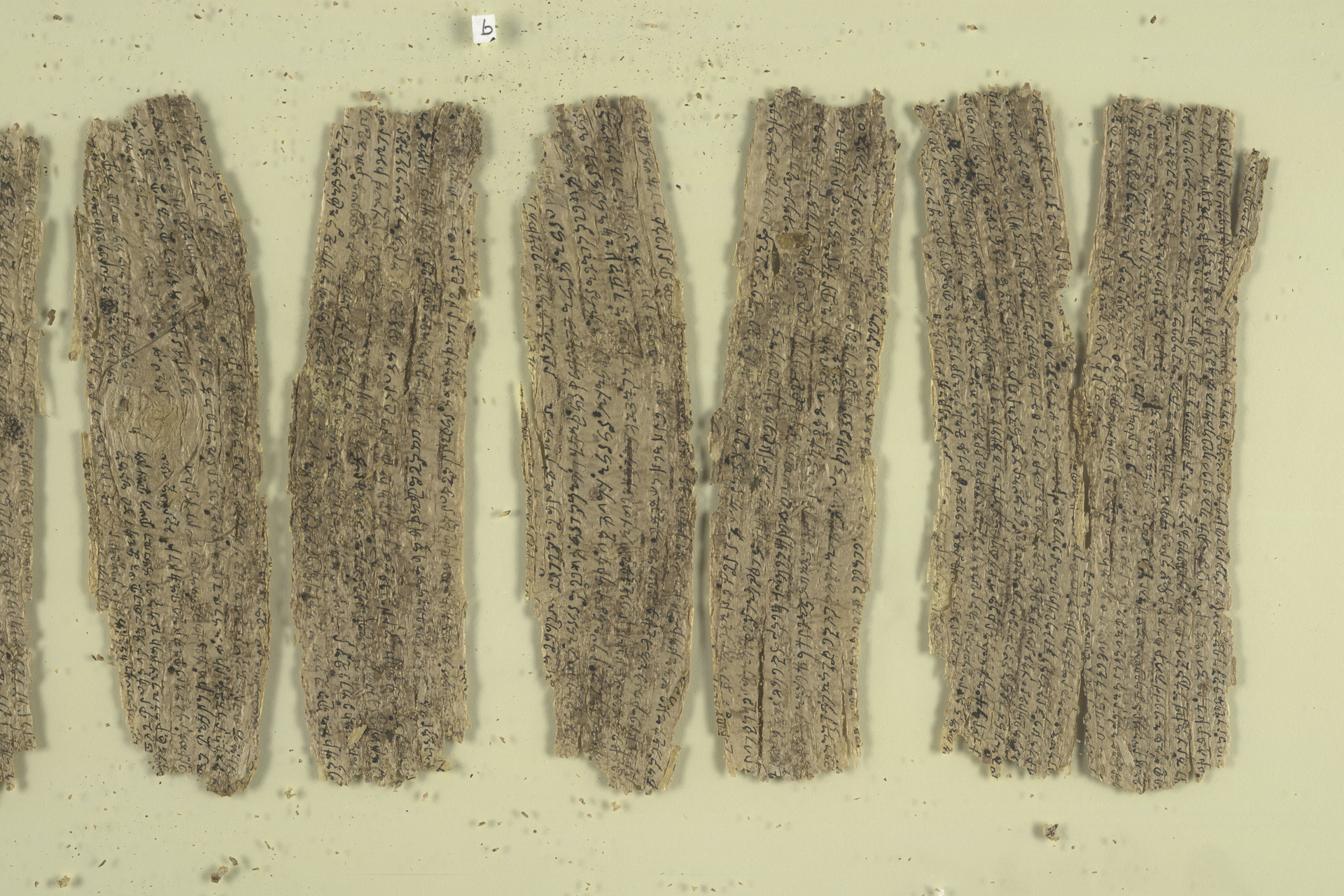
Gandhara birchbark scroll fragments (c. 1st century)

This comparative study began in the 19th century, when Samuel Beal published comparative translations of the Pali Patimokkha and the Chinese Dharmaguptaka Pratimoksa (1859), showing they were virtually identical. He followed this up with comparisons between the Chinese sutras and the Pali suttas in 1882, accurately predicting that "when the Vinaya and Āgama collections are thoroughly examined, I can have little doubt we shall find most if not all the Pali Suttas in Chinese form." In the following decades various scholars continued to produce a series of comparative studies, such as Anesaki, Akanuma (who composed a complete catalogue of parallels), Yin Shun and Thich Minh Chau. These studies, as well as recent work by Analayo, Marcus Bingenheimer and Mun-keat Choong, have shown that the essential doctrinal content of the Pali Majjhima and Samyutta Nikayas and the Chinese Madhyama and Samyukta Āgamas is mostly the same, (with, as Analayo notes, "occasional divergence in details").

According to scholars such as Rupert Gethin and Peter Harvey, the oldest recorded teachings are contained in the first four Nikayas of the Sutta Pitaka and their various parallels in other languages, (Note: The Digha Nikaya, Majjhima Nikaya, Samyutta Nikaya and Anguttara Nikaya) together with the main body of monastic rules, which survive in the various versions of the Patimokkha. Scholars have also claimed that there is a core within this core, referring to some poems and phrases which seem to be the oldest parts of the Sutta Pitaka. (Note: Nakamura: "It has been made clear that some poem (Gāthā) portions and some phrases represent earlier layers [...] Based upon these portions of the scriptures we can construe aspects of original Buddhism [...] Buddhism as appears in earlier portions of the scriptures is fairly different from what is explained by many scholars as earlier Buddhism or primitive Buddhism.)

The reliability of these sources, and the possibility to draw out a core of oldest teachings, is a matter of dispute. According to Tillman Vetter, the comparison of the oldest extant texts "does not just simply lead to the oldest nucleus of the doctrine." At best, it leads to:

...a Sthavira canon dating from c. 270 B.C. when the missionary activities during Asoka's reign as well as dogmatic disputes had not yet created divisions within the Sthavira tradition.

According to Vetter, inconsistencies remain, and other methods must be applied to resolve those inconsistencies. Because of this, scholars such as Edward Conze and A. K. Warder have argued that only the material which is common to both the Sthavira and the Mahasamghika canons can be seen as the most authentic, since they were the first communities after the first schism. The problem is that there is little material surviving from the Mahasamghika school. However, what we do have, such as the Mahasamghika Pratimoksha and Vinaya, is mostly consistent in doctrine with the Sthavira texts. Other Mahasamghika sources are the Mahavastu and (possibly) the Śālistamba Sūtra, both of which also contains phrases and doctrines that are found in the Sthavira canons.

Further exemplary studies are the study on descriptions of "liberating insight" by Lambert Schmithausen, the overview of early Buddhism by Tilmann Vetter, the philological work on the Four Truths by K. R. Norman, the textual studies by Richard Gombrich, and the research on early meditation methods by Johannes Bronkhorst.

== Scholarly positions ==
According to Schmithausen, three positions held by scholars of Buddhism can be distinguished regarding the possibility to extract the earliest Buddhism from the early Buddhist texts:

1. "Stress on the fundamental homogeneity and substantial authenticity of at least a considerable part of the Nikayic materials;" (Note: Well-known proponents of the first position are A. K. Warder (Note: According to A. K. Warder, in his 1970 publication Indian Buddhism, from the oldest extant texts a common kernel can be drawn out. According to Warder, c.q. his publisher: "This kernel of doctrine is presumably common Buddhism of the period before the great schisms of the fourth and third centuries BC. It may be substantially the Buddhism of the Buddha himself, although this cannot be proved: at any rate it is a Buddhism presupposed by the schools as existing about a hundred years after the parinirvana of the Buddha, and there is no evidence to suggest that it was formulated by anyone else than the Buddha and his immediate followers.") and Richard Gombrich. (Note: Richard Gombrich: "I have the greatest difficulty in accepting that the main edifice is not the work of a single genius. By 'the main edifice' I mean the collections of the main body of sermons, the four Nikāyas, and of the main body of monastic rules."))
2. "Skepticism with regard to the possibility of retrieving the doctrine of earliest Buddhism;" (Note: A proponent of the second position is Ronald Davidson. (Note: Ronald Davidson: "While most scholars agree that there was a rough body of sacred literature (disputed)(sic) that a relatively early community (disputed)(sic) maintained and transmitted, we have little confidence that much, if any, of surviving Buddhist scripture is actually the word of the historic Buddha."))
3. "Cautious optimism in this respect." (Note: Well-known proponents of the third position are J. W. de Jong, Johannes Bronkhorst (Note: Bronkhorst: "This position is to be preferred to (ii) for purely methodological reasons: only those who seek may find, even if no success is guaranteed.") and Donald Lopez. (Note: Lopez: "The original teachings of the historical Buddha are extremely difficult, if not impossible, to recover or reconstruct."))

=== Optimism regarding the early Buddhist texts ===
In his History of Indian Buddhism, Etienne Lamotte argues that while it "is impossible to say with certainty" what the doctrine of the historical Buddha was, "it is nonetheless a fact that, in order to appreciate early Buddhism, the only valid evidence – or indication – which we possess is the basic agreement between the Nikayas on the one hand and the Agamas on the other."

Likewise, Hajime Nakamura writes in his Indian Buddhism, that "there is no word that can be traced with unquestionable authority to Gotama Sakyamuni as a historical personage, although there must be some sayings or phrases derived from him." Nakamura adds that scholars must critically search the early scriptures for the oldest layer of material to find the "original Buddhism". Nakamura held that some of the earliest material were the Gathas (verses) found in the Sutta Nipata, as well as the Sagatha-vagga of the Samyutta Nikaya, the Itivuttaka and the Udana. These texts use less of the doctrinal material that is developed in other texts, are more likely to promote wilderness solitude over communal living and use terminology which is similar to Jain ideas.

British Indologist Rupert Gethin writes that "it is extremely likely" that at least some of the suttas in the four main Nikāyas "are among the oldest surviving Buddhist texts and contain material that goes back directly to the Buddha." Gethin agrees with Lamotte that the doctrinal basis of the Pali Nikayas and Chinese Agamas is "remarkably uniform" and "constitute the common ancient heritage of Buddhism."

Richard Gombrich agrees that the four Nikāyas and the main body of monastic rules present "such originality, intelligence, grandeur and—most relevantly—coherence, that it is hard to see it as a composite work" and thus concludes that it is the work of one genius, even if he agrees that when it comes to the Buddha's biography "we know next to nothing."

Peter Harvey affirms that the four older Nikāyas preserve an "early common stock" which "must derive from his [the Buddha’s] teachings" because the overall harmony of the texts suggest a single authorship, even while other parts of the Pali Canon clearly originated later.

The British Indologist A. K. Warder writes that "we are on safe ground only with those texts the authenticity of which is admitted by all schools of Buddhism (including the Mahayana, who admit the authenticity of the early canons as well as their own texts) not with texts only accepted by certain schools." Warder adds that when the extant material of the Tripitakas of the early Buddhist schools is examined "we find an agreement which is substantial, though not complete" and that there is a central body of sutras "which is so similar in all known versions that we must accept these as so many recensions of the same original texts."

Alexander Wynne has also argued for the historical authenticity of the early Buddhist texts (contra skeptics like Gregory Schopen) based on the internal textual evidence found inside them as well as archaeological and inscriptional evidence. As noted by Thomas William Rhys Davids, Wynne points out the Pali texts depict a pre-Asokan north India and he also cites K. R. Norman who argues that they show no Sinhalese Prakrit additions. Reviewing the literature by figures such as Frauwallner, Wynne argues that the Pali suttas reached Sri Lanka by 250 BCE and that they preserved certain details about fifth century north India (such as that Uddaka Rāmaputta lived near Rajagrha). Wynne concludes:

The corresponding pieces of textual material found in the canons of the different sects – especially the literature of the Pāli school, which was more isolated than the others – probably go back to pre-sectarian times. It is unlikely that these correspondences could have been produced by the joint endeavour of different Buddhist sects, for such an undertaking would have required organisation on a scale which was simply inconceivable in the ancient world. We must conclude that a careful examination of early Buddhist literature can reveal aspects of the pre-Aśokan history of Indian Buddhism.

=== Pessimism ===
One of the early Western skeptics was French Indologist Émile Senart, who argued in his Essai sur la legende du Buddha (1875) that the legends of Buddha's life were derived from pre-Buddhist myths of solar deities.

The late Edward Conze held that there was an "absence of hard facts" regarding the first period of Buddhism and regarding the teachings of the Buddha, "none of His sayings is preserved in its original form." Since we only possess a small fraction of the Buddhist literature that must have circulated during the early period, Conze held that all the scholarly attempts to reconstruct the 'original' teachings were "all mere guesswork" because "that which we have may have been composed at any time during the first 500 years" and "there is no objective criterion which would allow us to single out those elements in the record which go back to the Buddha Himself." Conze argues that comparative study using the sources of different schools could give us some knowledge of the pre-sectarian period doctrine, but he adds that such knowledge might not take us to the earliest period after the Buddha's parinirvana, which is a period that is "shrouded in mystery and to which we cannot penetrate."

Japanese Buddhologist Kogen Mizuno argues in his Buddhist Sutras: Origin, Development, Transmission that the material we possess may not contain the actual words of the Buddha because "they were not recorded as he spoke", but compiled after his death and also because they do not survive in the original language (some form of Magadhi Prakrit) but "transmitted in other Indic languages of later periods, and without doubt conscious and unconscious changes in the Buddha's words were made during several centuries of oral transmission." Mizuno does note that Pali is the oldest of these, but it is still different from old Magadhi and it is from a different region (Western India).

Ronald M. Davidson, a scholar of Tantric Buddhism, while acknowledging that most scholars agree that the early community maintained and transmitted a rough body of sacred literature, writes that "we have little confidence that much, if any, of surviving Buddhist scripture is actually the word of the historical Buddha." His view is that:

More persuasively, the Buddhist order in India might be considered the greatest scriptural composition community in human history. Given the extraordinary extent of the material passing at any one time under rubric of the “word of the Buddha,” we might simply pause and acknowledge that Indian Buddhists were extraordinarily facile litterateurs.

The American scholar Gregory Schopen holds that "we cannot know anything definite about the actual doctrinal content of the nikäya/ägama literature much before the fourth century C.E." Schopen is very critical of modern Buddhist studies because of its preference for literary evidence that "in most cases cannot actually be dated and that survives only in very recent manuscript traditions" that have been "heavily edited" and were intended as normative not historical accounts. Schopen believes that the preference for texts over archeology and epigraphy is a mistake and that it is Buddhist epigraphy which are the earliest written sources. Regarding the textual sources, Schopen holds that even the oldest sources such as the Pali Canon, "cannot be taken back further than the last quarter of the first century B.C.E, the date of the Alu-vihāra redaction," but that actually it is not until the 5th or 6th centuries CE "that we can know anything definite about the actual contents of this canon." He notes that references to Tipitaka and Nikaya date from much later periods than the Asokan era (such as Kaniska's reign). Only a few texts have been identified in Asoka's Edicts (such as his Bhabra Edict), but these are all short verse texts and are nothing like the suttas of the first and second Nikayas. Schopen concludes that it is only "from the end of the fourth century, that some of the doctrinal content of Hinayana canonical literature can finally be definitely dated and actually verified."

Regarding the view of comparative critical scholars that agreement between the different sectarian texts points to a common early source, Schopen counters that since this kind of higher criticism is already being done on texts which belong to "uniformly late stages of the literary tradition." Schopen believes instead that the agreement was produced by the sharing of literature and ideas between the different sects at a later date. Schopen defines this position as:

If all known versions of a text or passage agree, that text or passage is probably late; that is, it probably represents the results of the conflation and gradual leveling and harmonization of earlier existing traditions.

Citing Bareau and Wassilieff, he holds that it is just as likely that textual agreement among the different canons was produced by parallel development and contact between the different Indian traditions.

=== Moderate skepticism and reconstructionism ===
According to Constantin Regamey, the view followed by the "Franco-Belgian" school of Buddhist studies (which applies to figures like Jean Przyluski, Louis de La Vallée-Poussin, A. Weller, and A. B. Keith) did not consider the Pali Canon a straightforward "faithful reflection of the teachings of the Buddha". This group of scholars sought to use all available sources to reconstruct the original teachings of the Buddha in a way which diverged from the Pali focused perspective of Anglo-German Indologists such as Oldenberg and Frauwallner.

A common position of the Franco-Belgian school was that primitive Buddhism did not have such negative view of nirvana, but that it was a positive reality, a kind of immortal state (amrta) similar to the godly abode of svarga found in the Edicts of Ashoka.

These mainly continental European scholars attempted to reconstruct early Buddhism drawing on many sources, including Mahayana sources, instead of only relying on the Pali Canon. However, in the post-war years, Franco-Belgian scholars like Jean Filliozat mostly stuck to a moderate skepticism which did not hypothesise about what the original Buddhism may have been and merely focused on looking at the sectarian sources which currently exist (and which do not go back to the earliest period). Filliozat argues that any reconstruction "would remain purely ideal" and might be lacking in key doctrines that might have been lost over time. Since all the canons were edited at different times throughout history, any reconstruction would never arrive at original Buddhism.

Polish scholar Stanislaw Schayer (1899 – 1941) was one figure who followed this reconstructionist method to put forth a hypothesis of an alternative early Buddhist worldview. Schayer argued that the Nikayas preserve elements of an archaic form of Buddhism which is close to Brahmanical beliefs, and survived in the Mahayana tradition. As noted by Alexander Wynne, Schayer drew on passages "in which "consciousness" (viññana) seems to be the ultimate reality or substratum (e.g. A I.10), as well as the Saddhatu Sutra, which is not found in any canonical source but is cited in other Buddhist texts." According to Schayer, contrary to popular opinion, the Theravada and Mahayana traditions may be "divergent, but equally reliable records of a pre-canonical Buddhism which is now lost forever." The Mahayana tradition may have preserved a very old, "pre-canonical" tradition, which was largely, but not completely, left out of the Theravada.

Schayer searched through various early sources for ideas that contradict the dominant doctrinal positions of the early canon. According to Schayer, these ideas were "transmitted by a tradition old enough and considered to be authoritative by the compilers of the Canon." He thus considers these ideas which were "doctrines contradictory to the generally admitted canonical viewpoint" as "survivals of older, precanonical Buddhism." (Note: Schayer 1935, p. 124.)

Constantin Regamey has identified four points which are central to Schayer's reconstruction of precanonical Buddhism:

1. The Buddha was considered as an extraordinary supernatural being, in whom ultimate reality was embodied, and who was an incarnation of the mythical figure of the Tathagata;
2. The Buddha's disciples were attracted to his spiritual charisma and supernatural authority;
3. Nirvana was conceived as the attainment of a "persisting immortality", and the gaining of a deathless sphere from which there would be no falling back (acyuta pada), which is the pinnacle of reality, the supreme point of the Dharmadhatu. This nirvana, as a transmundane reality or state, an "eternal vijñana" and is incarnated in the person of the Buddha. The more radical anatman doctrine does not apply to this.
4. Nirvana can be reached because it already dwells as the inmost "consciousness" of the human being. It is a consciousness which is not subject to birth and death.

According to Ray, Schayer has shown a second doctrinal position alongside that of the more dominant tradition, one likely to be of at least equivalent, if not of greater, antiquity. However, according to Edward Conze, Schayer's views are "merely a tentative hypothesis" and that it is also possible that these ideas later entered Buddhism, as a concession to "popular demand, just as the lower goal of birth in heaven (svarga) was admitted side by side with Nirvana." Conze thought that both were equally possible.

The French scholar Constantin Regamey argues that Schayer's general position is cogent. Regamey argues that the various Buddhist canons, like the Pali Canon, have many chronological layers and include "many divergences and contradictions." As such, one cannot rely on any single one of them to construct the original view of the Buddha, especially since the teachings found in them are mostly composed of "terms, formulas, or bare patterns" that can and have been interpreted in many different ways. Regamey argues that a broader historicist method is needed, which draws on numerous sources, historical evidence and the very internal contradictions found in the canon. He argues that a broader historical method can show that early Buddhism might have supported ideas that are similar to Brahamanical theories of consciousness or some Mahayana views on consciousness and Buddhahood.

A similar view is defended by Christian Lindtner. Lindtner argues that some early Buddhist sources point to stainless, formless consciousness which is similar to Brahmanical ideas and later Mahayana views. He also argues that ancient Buddhist view of nirvana was likely cosmological (and had similarities with ancient Vedic cosmology) and that it was an eternal realm at the peak of existence (bhutakoti) one could reach by wisdom.

== Teachings of earliest Buddhism ==
The Dhammacakkappavattana Sutta (Note: Sammyuta Nikaya 56:11) is regarded by the Buddhist tradition as the first discourse of the Buddha. Scholars have noted some persistent problems with this view. Originally the text may only have pointed at the Middle Way as being the core of the Buddha's teaching, which pointed to the practice of dhyana. This basic term may have been extended with descriptions of the Eightfold Path, itself a condensation of a longer sequence. Some scholars believe that under pressure from developments in Indian religiosity, which began to see "liberating insight" as the essence of moksha, the Four Truths were then added as a description of the Buddha's "liberating insight".

=== Death, rebirth and karma ===
According to Tilmann Vetter, the Buddha at first sought "the deathless" (amata/amrta), which is concerned with the here and now. According to Edward Conze, Death was an error which could be overcome by those who entered the "doors to the Deathless", "the gates of the Undying". According to Conze, the Buddha saw death as a sign that "something has gone wrong with us." The Buddha saw death as brought on by an evil force, Māra, "the Killer," (Note: "Mara" is deeply rooted in Indo-European mythology. See also Mare (folklore).) "who tempts us away from our true immortal selves and diverts us from the path which could lead us back to freedom." Our cravings keep us tied to Mára’s realm. By releasing our attachments we move beyond his realm, and gain freedom from saṃsāra, the beginningless movement of death and rebirth.

Karma is the intentional (cetanā) actions which keep us tied to saṃsāra. Two views on the liberation from saṃsāra can be discerned in the Śramaṇic movements. Originally karma meant "physical and mental activity". One solution was to refrain from any physical or mental activity. The other solution was to see the real self as not participating in these actions, and to disidentify with those actions. According to Bronkhorst, the Buddha rejected both approaches. Nevertheless, these approaches can also be found in the Buddhist tradition, such as the four formless dhyanas, and disidentification from the constituents of the self. (Note: According to Bronkhorst, the Buddha's approach was a psychological one. He explains the incorporation of "inactivity asceticism" as effected by followers of the Buddha who misunderstood the Buddha's understanding of karma. Bronkhorst himself asks the question where this different view of karma came from, and speculates that the Buddha may have inherited it from his parents, or "modified his views in this respect in the light of the experiences that led to, or constituted, his liberation.")

Bruce Matthews notes that there is no cohesive presentation of karma in the Sutta Pitaka, which may mean that the doctrine was incidental to the main perspective of early Buddhist soteriology. Schmithausen is a notable scholar who has questioned whether karma already played a role in the theory of rebirth of earliest Buddhism. According to Schmithausen, "the karma doctrine may have been incidental to early Buddhist soteriology." According to Vetter, "the deathless" (amata/amrta) is concerned with the here and now. Only after this realisation did he become acquainted with the doctrine of rebirth. Bronkhorst disagrees, and concludes that the Buddha "introduced a concept of karma that differed considerably from the commonly held views of his time." According to Bronkhorst, no physical and mental activities as such were seen as responsible for rebirth, but intentions and desire.

==== Soul ====
According to Bronkhorst, referring to Frauwallner, Schmithausen and Bhattacharya:

It is possible that original Buddhism did not deny the existence of the soul. (Note: Bronkhorst: "(Frauwallner 1953: 217–253; Schmithausen 1969: 160–161; Bhattacharya, 1973)." See also Bronkhorst (2009), Buddhist Teaching in India, p. 22 ff.)

=== The Four Noble Truths ===
According to Eviatar Shulman, the doctrine of the Four Noble Truths is rooted in "a meditative perception regarding the arising and passing away of mental events" which also includes a "detached attitude" to phenomena. Out of this practice of "meditative observation" developed a theoretical or discursive philosophical understanding.

K. R. Norman concluded that the earliest version of the Dhammacakkappavattana Sutta did not contain the word "noble", but was added later. (Note: See also: Anderson (1999): "The appearance of the four noble truths in the introduction, enlightenment, and gerundival sets in the Dhammacakkappavattana-sutta provide evidence for Norman's correct conclusion that the teaching was probably not part of the earliest version of the Sutta."; Batchelor (2012): "In a 1992 paper entitled "The Four Noble Truths," Norman offers a detailed, philological analysis of The First Discourse, and arrives at the startling conclusion that "the earliest form of this sutta did not include the word ariya-saccaؐ (noble truth)" (Norman 2003: 223). On grammatical and syntactical grounds, he shows how the expression "noble truth" was inexpertly interpolated into the text at a later date than its original composition. But since no such original text has come down to us, we cannot know what it did say. All that can reasonably be deduced is that instead of talking of four noble truths, the text merely spoke of "four."") Lambert Schmithausen concluded that the four truths were a later development in early Buddhism.

Carol Anderson, following Lambert Schmithausen and K. R. Norman, notes that the four truths are missing in critical passages in the canon, and states:

...the four noble truths were probably not part of the earliest strata of what came to be recognized as Buddhism, but that they emerged as a central teaching in a slightly later period that still preceded the final redactions of the various Buddhist canons.

The Four Truths probably entered the Sutta Pitaka from the Vinaya, the rules for monastic order. They were first added to enlightenment-stories which contain the Four Dhyanas, replacing terms for "liberating insight". From there they were added to the biographical stories of the Buddha:

[I]t is more likely that the four truths are an addition to the biographies of the Buddha and to the Dhammacakkappavattana-sutta.

According to both Bronkhorst and Anderson, the Four Truths became a substitution for prajna, or "liberating insight", in the suttras in those texts where "liberating insight" was preceded by the Four Dhyanas. According to Bronkhorst, the Four Truths may not have been formulated in earliest Buddhism, and did not serve in earliest Buddhism as a description of "liberating insight". Gotama's teachings may have been personal, "adjusted to the need of each person."

This replacement was probably caused by the influence and pressures of the wider Indian religious landscape, "which claimed that one can be released only by some truth or higher knowledge."

=== The Noble Eightfold Path ===
According to Tilmann Vetter, the description of the Buddhist path may initially have been as simple as the term the Middle Way. In time, this short description was elaborated, resulting in the description of the Eightfold Path. Vetter and Bucknell both note that longer descriptions of "the path" can be found, which can be condensed into the Noble Eightfold Path. One of those longer sequences, from the Culahatthipadopama Sutta, the "Lesser Discourse on the Simile of the Elephant's Footprints", is as follows:

1. Dhammalsaddhalpabbajja: A layman hears a Buddha teach the Dhamma, comes to have faith in him, and decides to take ordination as a monk;
2. Sila: He adopts the moral precepts;
3. Indriyasamvara: He practises "guarding the six sense-doors";
4. Sati-sampajanna: He practises mindfulness and self-possession (actually described as mindfulness of the body, kāyānupassanā, that is, reflection on the impurities of the body);
5. Jhana 1: He finds an isolated spot, sits down cross-legged, purifies his mind of the hindrances, and attains the first rupa-jhana;
6. Jhana 2: He attains the second jhana;
7. Jhana 3: He attains the third jhana;
8. Jhana 4: He attains the fourth jhana;
9. Pubbenivasanussati-nana: He recollects his many former existences in samsara;
10. Sattanam Cutupapata-nana: He observes the death and rebirth of beings according to their karmas;
11. Asavakkhaya-nana: He brings about the destruction of the asavas (inflow, mental bias), and attains a profound realisation of (as opposed to mere knowledge about) the Four Noble Truths;
12. Vimutti: He perceives that he is now liberated, that he has done what was to be done.

=== Satipatthana ===
According to Grzegorz Polak, the four upassanā have been misunderstood by the developing Buddhist tradition, including Theravada, to refer to four different foundations. According to Polak, the four upassanā do not refer to four different foundations, but to the awareness of four different aspects of raising mindfulness:

- the six sense-bases which one needs to be aware of (kāyānupassanā);
- contemplation on vedanās, which arise with the contact between the senses and their objects (vedanānupassanā);
- the altered states of mind to which this practice leads (cittānupassanā);
- the development from the five hindrances to the seven factors of awakening (dhammānupassanā).

=== Dhyāna ===
According to Bronkhorst, dhyana was a Buddhist invention, whereas Alexander Wynne argues that dhyana was incorporated from Brahmanical practices, in the Nikayas ascribed to Āḷāra Kālāma and Uddaka Rāmaputta. These practices were paired to mindfulness and insight, and given a new interpretation. Kalupahana argues that the Buddha "reverted to the meditational practices" he had learned from Āḷāra Kālāma and Uddaka Rāmaputta. Norman notes that "the Buddha's way to release [...] was by means of meditative practices." Gombrich also notes that a development took place in early Buddhism resulting in a change in doctrine, which considered prajna to be an alternative means to "enlightenment".

==== Dhyāna and insight ====
A core problem in the study of early Buddhism is the relation between dhyana and insight. The Buddhist tradition has incorporated two traditions regarding the use of dhyana. There is a tradition that stresses attaining insight (bodhi, prajñā, kenshō) as the means to awakening and liberation. But it has also incorporated the yogic tradition, as reflected in the use of dhyana, which is rejected in other sutras as not achieving the final result of liberation. The problem was famously voiced in 1936 by Louis de La Vallée-Poussin, in his text Musila et Narada: Le Chemin de Nirvana. (Note: See Louis de La Vallée Poussin, Musial and Narad. Translated from the French by Gelongma Migme Chödrön and Gelong Lodrö Sangpo.)

Schmithausen (Note: In his often-cited article On Some Aspects of Descriptions or Theories of 'Liberating Insight' and 'Enlightenment' in Early Buddhism.) notes that the mention of the Four Noble Truths as constituting the core of "liberating insight", which is attained after mastering the Rupa Jhanas, is a later addition to texts such as Majjhima Nikaya 36. Schmithausen discerns three possible roads to liberation as described in the suttas, to which Vetter adds the sole practice of dhyana itself, which he sees as the original "liberating practice":

1. The four Rupa Jhanas themselves constituted the core liberating practice of early buddhism, c.q. the Buddha;
2. Mastering the four Rupa Jhanas, whereafter "liberating insight" is attained;
3. Mastering the four Rupa Jhanas and the four Arupa Jhanas, where-after "liberating insight" is attained;
4. Liberating insight itself suffices.

This problem has been elaborated by several well-known scholars, including Tilman Vetter, Johannes Bronkhorst, and Richard Gombrich.

==== The meaning of samadhi ====
Traditionally, meditation is often described as samadhi, one-pointed concentration, and dhyana and samadhi are often referred to interchangeably. Yet, Schmithausen, Vetter and Bronkhorst note that the attainment of insight and mindfulness, which is a cognitive activity, cannot be possible in a state wherein all cognitive activity has ceased. Vetter notes that "penetrating abstract truths and penetrating them successively does not seem possible in a state of mind which is without contemplation and reflection."

According to Richard Gombrich, the sequence of the four rupa-jhanas describes two different cognitive states, namely concentration followed by a sharpened attention. (Note: Gombrich: "I know this is controversial, but it seems to me that the third and fourth jhanas are thus quite unlike the second.") Alexander Wynne further explains that the dhyana-scheme is poorly understood. According to Wynne, words expressing the inculcation of awareness, such as sati, sampajāno, and upekkhā, are mistranslated or understood as particular factors of meditative states, whereas they refer to a particular way of perceiving the sense objects. (Note: Wynne: "Thus the expression sato sampajāno in the third jhāna must denote a state of awareness different from the meditative absorption of the second jhāna (cetaso ekodibhāva). It suggests that the subject is doing something different from remaining in a meditative state, i.e., that he has come out of his absorption and is now once again aware of objects. The same is true of the word upek(k)hā: it does not denote an abstract 'equanimity', [but] it means to be aware of something and indifferent to it [...] The third and fourth jhāna-s, as it seems to me, describe the process of directing states of meditative absorption towards the mindful awareness of objects.) According to Gombrich, "the later tradition has falsified the jhana by classifying them as the quintessence of the concentrated, calming kind of meditation, ignoring the other – and indeed higher – element.

According to Vetter and Bronkhorst, dhyāna itself constituted the original "liberating practice". Vetter further argues that the eightfold path constitutes a body of practices which prepare one, and lead up to, the practice of dhyana.

==== Liberating insight ====
Discriminating insight into transiency as a separate path to liberation was a later development. According to Johannes Bronkhorst, Tillman Vetter, and K. R. Norman, bodhi was at first not specified. K. R. Norman:

It is not at all clear what gaining bodhi means. We are accustomed to the translation "enlightenment" for bodhi, but this is misleading [...] It is not clear what the Buddha was awakened to, or at what particular point the awakening came.

According to Norman, bodhi may basically have meant the knowledge that nirvana was attained, due to the practice of dhyana.

Bronkhorst notes that the conception of what exactly this "liberating insight" was developed throughout time. Whereas originally it may not have been specified, later on the Four Truths served as such, to be superseded by Pratityasamutpada, and still later, in the Hinayana schools, by the doctrine of the non-existence of a substantial self or person. And Schmithausen notices that still other descriptions of this "liberating insight" exist in the Buddhist canon:

"...that the five Skandhas are impermanent, disagreeable, and neither the Self nor belonging to oneself"; (Note: Majjhima Nikaya 26) "the contemplation of the arising and disappearance (udayabbaya) of the five Skandhas"; (Note: Anguttara Nikaya II.45 (PTS)) "the realisation of the Skandhas as empty (rittaka), vain (tucchaka) and without any pith or substance (asaraka). (Note: Samyutta Nikaya III.140-142 (PTS))

The developing importance of liberating insight may have been due to an over-literal interpretation by later scholastics of the terminology used by the Buddha, or to the problems involved with the practice of dhyana, and the need to develop an easier method. According to Vetter it may not have been as effective as dhyana, and methods were developed to deepen the effects of discriminating insight. Insight was also paired to dhyana, resulting in the well-known sila-samadhi-prajna scheme. According to Vetter this kind of preparatory dhyana must have been different from the practice introduced by the Buddha, using kasina-exercises to produce a "more artificially produced dhyana", resulting in the cessation of apperceptions and feelings. It also led to a different understanding of the Eightfold Path, since this path does not end with insight, but rather starts with insight. The path was no longer seen as a sequential development resulting in dhyana, but as a set of practices which had to be developed simultaneously to gain insight.

According to Alexander Wynne, the ultimate aim of dhyana was the attainment of insight, and the application of the meditative state to the practice of mindfulness. According to Frauwallner, mindfulness was a means to prevent the arising of craving, which resulted simply from contact between the senses and their objects. According to Frauwallner this may have been the Buddha’s original idea. According to Wynne, this stress on mindfulness may have led to the intellectualism which favoured insight over the practice of dhyana.

==== Insight and dhyana as complementary ====
Rupert Gethin rejects the notion of two opposing paths, arguing that a close study of the bodhipakkhiyādhammās, particularly the bojjhangas, shows how there is no conflict between samadhi and insight practices in early Buddhism, but that "in fact it turns out that the characteristically early Buddhist conception of the path leading to the cessation of suffering is that it consists precisely in the combining of calm and insight."

Bhikkhu Analayo, scholar of the early texts, has also critiqued the view that there are two contrasting views of liberation in the early sources (i.e. dhyana vs insight). According to Analayo, samadhi and insight are actually two complementary aspects of the path to liberation. Analayo refers to Damien Keown who writes that, for the Buddha, "there exist two techniques of meditation precisely because the obstacles to enlightenment are themselves twofold, both moral and intellectual." Analayo also refers to Collett Cox, who noted that it is possible that the Buddhist goal of the elimination of the asravas “subsumes knowledge and concentration as equally cooperative means rather than mutually exclusive ends,” and that this view is also reflected in Abhidharma.

Keren Arbel describes the fourth jhana as "non-reactive and lucid awareness," not as a state of deep concentration. She sees samadhi and insight as closely connected, and argues that in the Pali Suttas, "the entrance into the first jhāna is the actualization and embodiment of insight practice."

=== Dependent origination ===
While Pratītyasamutpāda, "dependent origination," and the twelve nidānas, the links of dependent origination, are traditionally interpreted as describing the conditional arising of rebirth in saṃsāra, and the resultant duḥkha (suffering, pain, unsatisfactoriness), Theravada questions the authenticity of this interpretation, and regards the list as describing the arising of mental formations and the resultant notion of "I" and "mine," which are the source of suffering.

Scholars have noted inconsistencies in the list, and regard it to be a later synthesis of several older lists. The first four links may be a mockery of the Vedic-Brahmanic cosmogeny, as described in the Hymn of Creation of Veda X, 129 and the Brihadaranyaka Upanishad. These were integrated with a branched list which describe the conditioning of mental processes, akin to the five skandhas. Eventually, this branched list developed into the standard twelvefold chain as a linear list. While this list may be interpreted as describing the processes which give rise to rebirth, in essence it describes the arising of duhkha as a psychological process, without the involvement of an atman.

=== 37 factors of enlightenment ===
According to A. K. Warder the bodhipakkhiyādhammā, the 37 factors of enlightenment, are a summary of the core Buddhist teachings which are common to all schools. (Note: In his 1970 publication Indian Buddhism, which predates the discoveries of Norman, Schmithausen, Vetter, Bronkhorst and Gombrich.) These factors are summarised in the Mahaparinibbana Sutta, (Note: Digha Nikaya 10) which recounts the Buddha's last days, in the Buddha's last address to his bikkhus:

Now, O bhikkhus, I say to you that these teachings of which I have direct knowledge and which I have made known to you — these you should thoroughly learn, cultivate, develop, and frequently practice, that the life of purity may be established and may long endure, for the welfare and happiness of the multitude, out of compassion for the world, for the benefit, well being, and happiness of gods and men.
And what, bhikkhus, are these teachings? They are the four foundations of mindfulness, the four right efforts, the four constituents of psychic power, the five faculties, the five powers, the seven factors of enlightenment, and the Noble Eightfold Path. These, bhikkhus, are the teachings of which I have direct knowledge, which I have made known to you, and which you should thoroughly learn, cultivate, develop, and frequently practice.

Alex Wayman has criticised A. K. Warder, for failing to present an integrated picture of early Buddhism. But according to Gethin, the bodhipakkhiyādhammā provide a key to understanding the relationship between calm and insight in early Buddhist meditation theory, bringing together the practice of dhyana with the development of wisdom.

=== Nirvana ===
==== As cessation and ending of rebirth ====
Most modern scholars such as Rupert Gethin, Richard Gombrich and Paul Williams hold that the goal of early Buddhism, nirvāṇa (nibbana in Pali, also called nibbanadhatu, the property of nibbana), means the 'blowing out' or 'extinguishing' of greed, aversion, and delusion (the simile used in texts is that of a flame going out), and that this signifies the permanent cessation of samsara and rebirth. (Note: Samyutta Nikaya IV 251 and IV 261) As Gethin notes, "this is not a 'thing' but an event or experience" that frees one from rebirth in samsara. Gombrich argues that the metaphor of blowing out refers to fires which were kept by priests of Brahmanism, and symbolise life in the world.

According to Donald Swearer, the journey to nirvana is not a journey to a "separate reality", but a move towards calm, equanimity, nonattachment and nonself. Thomas Kasulis notes that in the early texts, nirvana is often described in negative terms, including “cessation” (nirodha), “the absence of craving” (trsnaksaya), “detachment,” “the absence of delusion,” and “the unconditioned” (asamskrta). He also notes that there is little discussion in the early Buddhist texts about the metaphysical nature of nirvana, since they seem to hold that metaphysical speculation is an obstacle to the goal. Kasulis mentions the Malunkyaputta Sutta which denies any view about the existence of the Buddha after his final bodily death, all positions (the Buddha exists after death, does not exist, both or neither) are rejected. Likewise, another Sutta (AN II 161) has Sāriputta saying that asking the question "Is there anything else?" after the physical death of someone who has attained nibbana is conceptualising or proliferating (papañca) about that which is without proliferation (appapañcaṃ) and thus a kind of distorted thinking bound up with the self.

==== As a kind of consciousness or a place ====
Edward Conze argued that Nirvana was a kind of Absolute. He mentions ideas like the "person" (pudgala), the assumption of an eternal "consciousness" in the Saddhatu Sutra, the identification of the Absolute, of Nirvana, with an "invisible infinite consciousness, which shines everywhere" in Digha Nikaya XI 85, and "traces of a belief in consciousness as the nonimpermanent centre of the personality which constitutes an absolute element in this contingent world" as pointing to this.

Influenced by Schayer, M. Falk argues that the early Buddhist view of nirvana is that it is an "abode" or "place" of prajña, which is gained by the enlightened. (Note: Digha Nikaya 15, Mahanidana Sutta, which describes a nine-fold chain of causation. Mind-and-body (nama-rupa) and consciousness (vijnana) do condition here each other (verse 2 and 3). In verse 21 and 22, it is stated that consciousness comes into the mother's womb, and finds a resting place in mind-and-body.) (Note: M. Falk 1943, Nama-rupa and Dharma-rupa) This nirvanic element, as an "essence" or pure consciousness, is immanent within samsara. The three bodies are concentric realities, which are stripped away or abandoned, leaving only the nirodhakaya of the liberated person. (Note: According to Alexander Wynne, Schayer: "referred to passages in which "consciousness" (vinnana) seems to be the ultimate reality or substratum (e.g. A I.10) 14 as well as the Saddhatu Sutra, which is not found in any canonical source but is cited in other Buddhist texts — it states that the personality (pudgala) consists of the six elements (dhatu) of earth, water, fire, wind, space and consciousness; Schayer noted that it related to other ancient Indian ideas. Keith’s argument is also based on the Saddhatu Sutra as well as "passages where we have explanations of Nirvana which echo the ideas of the Upanishads regarding the ultimate reality." He also refers to the doctrine of "a consciousness, originally pure, defiled by adventitious impurities.") A similar view is also defended by C. Lindtner, who argues that in precanonical Buddhism Nirvana is:

...a place one can actually go to. It is called nirvanadhatu, has no border-signs (animitta), is localized somewhere beyond the other six dhatus (beginning with earth and ending with vijñana) but is closest to akasa and vijñana. One cannot visualize it, it is anidarsana, but it provides one with firm ground under one’s feet, it is dhruva; once there one will not slip back, it is acyutapada. As opposed to this world, it is a pleasant place to be in, it is sukha, things work well. (Note: Lindtner 1997. Cited in Wynne 2007, p. 99.)

According to Lindtner, Canonical Buddhism was a reaction to this view, but also against the absolutist tendencies in Jainism and the Upanisads. Nirvana came to be seen as a state of mind, instead of a concrete place. Elements of this precanonical Buddhism may have survived the canonisation, and its subsequent filtering out of ideas, and re-appeared in Mahayana Buddhism. According to Lindtner, the existence of multiple, and contradicting ideas, is also reflected in the works of Nagarjuna, who tried to harmonise these different ideas. According to Lindtner, this lead him to taking a "paradoxical" stance, for instance regarding nirvana, rejecting any positive description.

Referring to this view, Alexander Wynne holds that there is no evidence in the Sutta Pitaka that the Buddha held this view, at best it only shows that "some of the early Buddhists were influenced by their Brahminic peers." Wynne concludes that the Buddha rejected the views of the Vedas and that his teachings present a radical departure from these Brahminical beliefs.

== See also ==
- Atthakavagga and Parayanavagga
- Buddhist paths to liberation
- Basic Points Unifying the Theravāda and the Mahāyāna
- Buddhist councils
- History of Buddhism
- Index of Buddhism-related articles
- Outline of Buddhism

== Sources ==
=== Printed sources ===
- Akizuki, Ryōmin (1990), New Mahāyāna: Buddhism for a Post-modern World, Jain Publishing Company
- Analayo (2011), A Comparative Study of the Majjhima-nikāya, Dharma Drum Academic Publisher
- Analayo (2016), "A Brief Criticism of the 'Two Paths to Liberation' Theory" (PDF), Journal of the Oxford Centre for Buddhist Studies, 11: 87–107
- Analayo (2017), Early Buddhist Meditation Studies (PDF), Barre Center for Buddhist Studies, ISBN 978-1540410504
- Anderson, Carol (1999), Pain and Its Ending: The Four Noble Truths in the Theravada Buddhist Canon, Routledge
- Arbel, Keren (2016), "The Liberative Role of Jhānic Joy (Pīti) and Pleasure (Sukha) in the Early Buddhist Path to Awakening", Buddhist Studies Review, 32 (2): 179–206, doi:10.1558/bsrv.v32i2.28328
- Arbel, Keren (2017), Early Buddhist Meditation: The Four Jhanas as the Actualization of Insight, Routledge, doi:10.4324/9781315676043, ISBN 9781317383994
- Batchelor, Stephen (2012), "A Secular Buddhism", Journal of Global Buddhism, 13: 87–107
- Boisvert, Mathieu (1995), The Five Aggregates: Understanding Theravada Psychology and Soteriology, Wilfrid Laurier University Press, ISBN 978-0-88920-257-3
- Brahmali, Bhikkhu (2009), "What the Nikāyas Say and Do not Say about Nibbāna", Buddhist Studies Review, 26 (1): 33–66, doi:10.1558/bsrv.v26i1.33, ISSN 0265-2897
- Bronkhorst, Johannes (1993), The Two Traditions Of Meditation In Ancient India, Motilal Banarsidass Publ.
- Bronkhorst, Johannes (1998), "Did the Buddha Believe in Karma and Rebirth?", Journal of the International Association of Buddhist Studies, 21 (1)
- Bucknell, Rod (1984), "The Buddhist to Liberation: An Analysis of the Listing of Stages", The Journal of the International Association of Buddhist Studies, 7 (2): 7–40
- Bucknell, Roderick S. (1999), "Conditioned Arising Evolves: Variation and Change in Textual Accounts of the Paticca-samupadda Doctrine", Journal of the International Association of Buddhist Studies, 22 (2)
- Buswell, Robert E., ed. (2004), Encyclopedia of Buddhism, Macmillan
- Carr, Brian; Mahalingam, Indira (1997), Companion Encyclopedia of Asian Philosophy, London; New York: Routledge, ISBN 978-0-415-03535-4
- Conze, Edward (1967), Thirty years of Buddhist Studies. Selected essays by Edward Conze (PDF), Bruno Cassirer
- Conze, Edward (2000), Buddhism. A Short History, Oneworld
- Conze, Edward (2008), Buddhism. A Short History, Oneworld
- Cousins, L. S. (1996), "The dating of the historical Buddha: a review article", Journal of the Royal Asiatic Society, Third Series, 6 (1): 57–63, doi:10.1017/S1356186300014760, S2CID 162929573
- Cox, Collett (1995), Disputed Dharmas: Early Buddhist Theories on Existence, Tokyo: The Institute for Buddhist Studies, ISBN 4-906267-36-X
- Cox, Collett. "Mainstream Buddhist Schools". In Buswell (2004).
- Davidson, Ronald M. (2003), Indian Esoteric Buddhism: Social History of the Tantric Movement, Columbia University Press, ISBN 978-0-231-12618-2
- Davidson, Ronald M. (2004), Indian Esoteric Buddhism: Social History of the Tantric Movement, Motilal Banarsidass, ISBN 978-8-120-81991-7
- Flood, Gavin; Olivelle, Patrick (2003), The Blackwell Companion to Hinduism, Blackwell
- Frauwallner, Erich (1956), The Earliest Vinaya and the Beginnings of Buddhist Literature, Serie Orientale Roma, Istituto Italiano per il Medio ed Estremo Oriente
- Frauwallner, Erich (1973), "Chapter 5. The Buddha and the Jina", History of Indian Philosophy, Vol. 1: The philosophy of the Veda and of the epic. The Buddha and the Jina. The Sāmkhya and the classical Yoga-system, translated by V.M. Bedekar, Motilal Banarsidass
- Gethin, Rupert (1998), Foundations of Buddhism, Oxford University Press
- Gethin, Rupert (2001) [1992], The Buddhist Path to Awakening (2nd ed.), Oxford: Oneworld Publications
- Gethin, Rupert (2008), Sayings of the Buddha: New Translations from the Pali Nikayas, Oxford World’s Classics, Oxford University Press
- Gombrich, Richard F. (1997), How Buddhism Began: The Conditioned Genesis of the Early Teachings, Munshiram Manoharlal, ISBN 978-8-121-50812-4
- Gombrich, Richard F. (2006), How Buddhism Began: The Conditioned Genesis of the Early Teachings (2nd ed.), Routledge, ISBN 978-0-415-37123-0
- Gombrich, Richard F. (2006a), Theravāda Buddhism: A Social History from Ancient Benares to Modern Colombo, Library of Religious Beliefs and Practices, Routledge, ISBN 978-1-134-90352-8
- Gombrich, Richard F. (2009), "Chapter 9. Causation and non-random process", What the Buddha Thought, Equinox
- Harrison, Paul. "Mahasamghika School". In Buswell (2004).
- Harvey, Peter (1990), An Introduction to Buddhism: Teachings, History and Practices, Introduction to Religion, Cambridge University Press
- Harvey, Peter (2015), "The Conditioned Co-arising of Mental and Bodily Processes within Life and Between Lives", in Emmanuel, Steven M. (ed.), A Companion to Buddhist Philosophy, John Wiley & Sons, ISBN 978-1-119-14466-3
- Hirakawa (1990), History of Indian Buddhism, volume 1, Hawai'i University Press
- Hurvitz, Leon (1976), Scripture of the Lotus Blossom of the Fine Dharma, Columbia University Press
- Jones, Dhivan Thomas (2009), "New Light on the Twelve Nidanas", Contemporary Buddhism, 10 (2), 10 (2): 241–259, doi:10.1080/14639940903239793, S2CID 145413087
- Jong, J.W. de (1993), "The Beginnings of Buddhism", The Eastern Buddhist, 26 (2)
- Jurewicz, Joanna (2000), "Playing with Fire: The pratityasamutpada from the perspective of Vedic thought" (PDF), Journal of the Pali Text Society, 26: 77–103, archived from the original (PDF) on 2015-04-09
- Kalupahana, David J. (1994), A history of Buddhist philosophy, Delhi: Motilal Banarsidass Publishers Private Limited
- Lindtner, Christian (1997), "The Problem of Precanonical Buddhism", Buddhist Studies Review, 14 (2): 2, doi:10.1558/bsrv.v14i2.14851, S2CID 247883744
- Lindtner, Christian (1999), "From Brahmanism to Buddhism", Asian Philosophy, 9 (1): 5–37, doi:10.1080/09552369908575487
- Lopez, Donald S. (1995), Buddhism in Practice (PDF), Princeton University Press, archived from the original (PDF) on 2017-07-08
- Matthews, Bruce (1986), Post-Classical Developments In The Concepts of Karma and Rebirth in Theravada Buddhism. In: Ronald W. Neufeldt (ed.), "Karma and rebirth: Post-classical developments", SUNY
- Mizuno Kogen (1982), Buddhist Sutras: Origin, Development, Transmission, Kosei
- Mun-keat, Choong (2000), The Fundamental Teachings of Early Buddhism. A comparative study based on the Sutranga portion of the Pali Sarpyutta-Nikaya and the Chinese Sarpyuktagama, Harrassowitz Verlag
- Nakamura, Hajime (1980), Indian Buddhism: a survey with bibliographical notes, Intercultural Research Institute monograph series, KUFS Publication
- Nakamura, Hajime (1989), Indian Buddhism, Motilal Banarsidass
- Nilakanta Sastri, K. A. (1988), Age of the Nandas and Mauryas, Motilal Banarsidass, ISBN 978-81-208-0466-1
- Norman, K.R. (1992), "The Four Noble Truths", Collected Papers, vol. 2, Pali Text Society (published 2003), pp. 210–223
- Norman, K.R. (1997), A Philological Approach to Buddhism. The Bukkyo Dendo Kybkai Lectures 1994 (PDF), School of Oriental and African Studies (University of London)
- Polak, Grzegorz (2011), Reexamining Jhana: Towards a Critical Reconstruction of Early Buddhist Soteriology, UMCS
- Potter, Karl H., ed. (1996), Encyclopedia of Indian Philosophies Part VII: Abhidharma Buddhism to 150 A.D., Motilall Banarsidass
- Ray, Reginald (1999), Buddhist Saints in India: A Study in Buddhist Values and Orientations, Oxford University Press
- Samuel, Geoffrey (2008), The Origins of Yoga and Tantra: Indic Religions to the Thirteenth Century, Cambridge University Press
- Samuel, Geoffrey (2010), The Origins of Yoga and Tantra: Indic Religions to the Thirteenth Century, Cambridge University Press
- Schmithausen, Lambert (1981), "On some Aspects of Descriptions or Theories of 'Liberating Insight' and 'Enlightenment' in Early Buddhism", in Klaus Bruhn and Albrecht Wezler (ed.), Studien zum Jainismus und Buddhismus (Gedenkschrift für Ludwig Alsdorf) [Studies on Jainism and Buddhism (Memorial for Ludwig Alsdorf)], Wiesbaden, pp. 199–250
- Schmithausen, Lambert (1986), "Critical Response", in Ronald W. Neufeldt (ed.), Karma and rebirth: Post-classical developments, SUNY
- Schmithausen, Lambert (1990), Buddhism and Nature, Tokyo, OCLC 697272229
- Schopen, Gregory (1997), Bones, Stones, and Buddhist Monks, University of Hawai’i Press, ISBN 9780824817480
- Schumann, Hans Wolfgang (1997) [1976], Boeddhisme. Stichter, scholen, systemen [Buddhism. Founder, schools, systems], Asoka
- Shulman, Eviatar (April 2008), "Early Meanings of Dependent-Origination", Journal of Indian Philosophy, 36 (2): 297–317, doi:10.1007/s10781-007-9030-8, S2CID 59132368
- Shulman, Eviatar (2014), Rethinking the Buddha: Early Buddhist Philosophy as Meditative Perception, Cambridge University Press
- Sujato, Bhante (2012), Sects & Sectarianism: The Origins of Buddhist Schools (PDF), Santipada, ISBN 9781921842061, archived from the original (PDF) on December 18, 2018
- Sujato, Bhante; Brahmali, Bhikkhu (2015), The Authenticity of the Early Buddhist Texts (PDF), Chroniker Press, ISBN 9781312911505
- Svarghese, Alexander P. (2008), India : History, Religion, Vision And Contribution To The World
- Vetter, Tilmann (1988), The Ideas and Meditative Practices of Early Buddhism, BRILL
- Walshe, Maurice (1995), The Long Discourses of the Buddha. A Translation of the Digha Nikaya, Wisdom Publications
- Warder, A.K. (1999), Indian Buddhism, Delhi
- Warder, A.K. (2000), Indian Buddhism, Motilal Banarsidass Publ.
- Warder, A.K. (2004), Indian Buddhism, 3rd Revised edition, Motilal Banarsidass Publ.
- Wayman, Alex (1971), "Buddhist Dependent Origination", History of Religions, 10 (3): 185–203, doi:10.1086/462628, JSTOR 1062009, S2CID 161507469
- Wayman, Alex (1984a), "Dependent Origination - the Indo-Tibetan Vision", Buddhist Insight: Essays, Motilal Banarsidass, pp. 163–192
- Wayman, Alex (1984b), "The Intermediate-State Dispute in Buddhism", Buddhist Insight: Essays, Motilal Banarsidass, pp. 251–266
- Wayman, Alex (1990) [1984], Elder, George R. (ed.), Buddhist Insight: Essays, Motilall Banarsidass, ISBN 978-81-208-0675-7
- Williams, Paul (2000), Mahayana Buddhism: The Doctrinal Foundations, Routledge
- Wynne, Alexander (2007), The Origin of Buddhist Meditation, Routledge
