= Early Buddhism =

The term Early Buddhism can refer to at least two distinct periods in the History of Buddhism, mostly in the History of Buddhism in India:

- Pre-sectarian Buddhism, which refers to the teachings and monastic organization and structure, founded by Gautama Buddha.
- The Early Buddhist schools, into which pre-sectarian Buddhism split during or after the reign of Ashoka
