= Salistamba Sutra =

Sutra in Mahāyāna Buddhism

The Śālistamba Sūtra ("rice stalk" or "rice sapling sūtra") is an early Buddhist text that shows a few unique features which indicate a turn to the early Mahāyāna. It thus has been considered one of the first Mahāyāna sūtras. According to N. Ross Reat, the sutra could date as far back as 200 BCE. It is possible that this sutra represents a period of Buddhist literature before the Mahāyāna had diverged significantly from the doctrines of the Early Buddhist schools.

Three commentaries on the sutra traditionally attributed to Nāgārjuna also survive in Tibetan (Peking nos. 5466, 5485, 5486). There is also a commentary attributed to Kamalaśīla (eighth century).

== Overview ==
While the Śālistamba does not survive fully in Sanskrit, it is the most widely quoted sutra in Mahāyāna texts on the topic of pratītyasamutpāda and thus about 90 percent of the material survives as various quotations in other Buddhist Sanskrit works. Therefore, the Sanskrit has been reconstructed by modern scholars (beginning with the work of Louis de La Vallée-Poussin, 1913). Many passages in this sutra have close parallels in the Pāli suttas (especially the Mahātāṇha-sankhaya Sutta, M1:256-71). The Śālistamba also survives in six Chinese translations and in various Tibetan recensions, including some manuscripts from Dunhuang, and it is thus of great textual, historical and philological importance.

The Śālistamba Sūtra shows that its proto-Mahāyāna transmitters (possibly the Mahāsāṃghikas) knew and accepted a theory of dependent origination which is almost identical with that of the Pāli Canon. It also shows an intent to consolidate and systematize material that is found throughout the Pāli Canon with a few innovations, albeit conservative ones. For example, it applies a simile of seed and plants to the doctrine of dependent origination, something which is not found in the Pāli Canon. The core of the sutra is an "elaboration upon cause (hetu) in the subjective pratītyasamutpāda formula."

Mahāyāna elements in the sutra include the fact that it is said to be given by the Bodhisattva Maitreya and that it ends stating that whoever understands dependent arising will become a perfectly enlightened Buddha. The sutra is also a work focusing on the attainment of the Dharmakāya Buddha, stating "Whoever, monks, sees conditioned arising sees Dharma, and whoever sees Dharma sees the Buddha" (a combination of two well known statements in the Pāli suttas). The sutra also seems to move closer to the Mahāyāna view that reality is illusory, using the term māyā and also similes using reflections, which would become widely used to illustrate illusoriness in the Mahāyāna sutras.

N. Ross Reat notes that this indicates that the early Mahāyāna tendency was not "self-consciously schismatic" but was simply one of the many attempts to systematize and elaborate on the Buddha's teachings. While some schools chose to incorporate these systematizations into Abhidharma texts, the proto-Mahāyāna chose to incorporate them into sutras.

There are three commentaries on the text:

- Śālistamba[ka]ṭīkā by Kamalaśīla
- Śālistamba[ka]mahāyānasūtraṭīkā attributed to a Nāgārjuna
- Śālistambakakārikā attributed to a Nāgārjuna

== Translations and editions ==
- Reat, N. Ross. The Śālistamba Sūtra: Tibetan original, Sanskrit reconstruction, English translation, critical notes (including Pali parallels, Chinese version, and ancient Tibetan fragments). Delhi : Motilal Banarsidass Publishers, 1993.
- Schoening, Jeffrey D. The Śālistamba Sūtra and Its Indian Commentaries

== See also ==
- Mahayana
- Sanskrit Buddhist literature
- Pre-sectarian Buddhism
