= Kogen Mizuno =

Japanese writer (1901–2006)

Kōgen Mizuno
- 水野 弘元
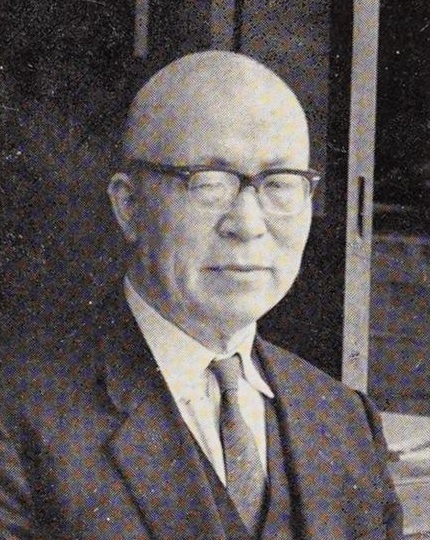
- Born: Hiromoto Mizuno; November 19, 1901; Japan
- Died: January 1, 2006 (aged 104)
- Education: Komazawa University; University of Tokyo
- Occupation: Writer
- Writing career
- Language: Japanese
- Genre: Buddhism
- Subjects: Pre-sectarian Buddhism; Pali language
- Notable awards: Purple Ribbon Medal

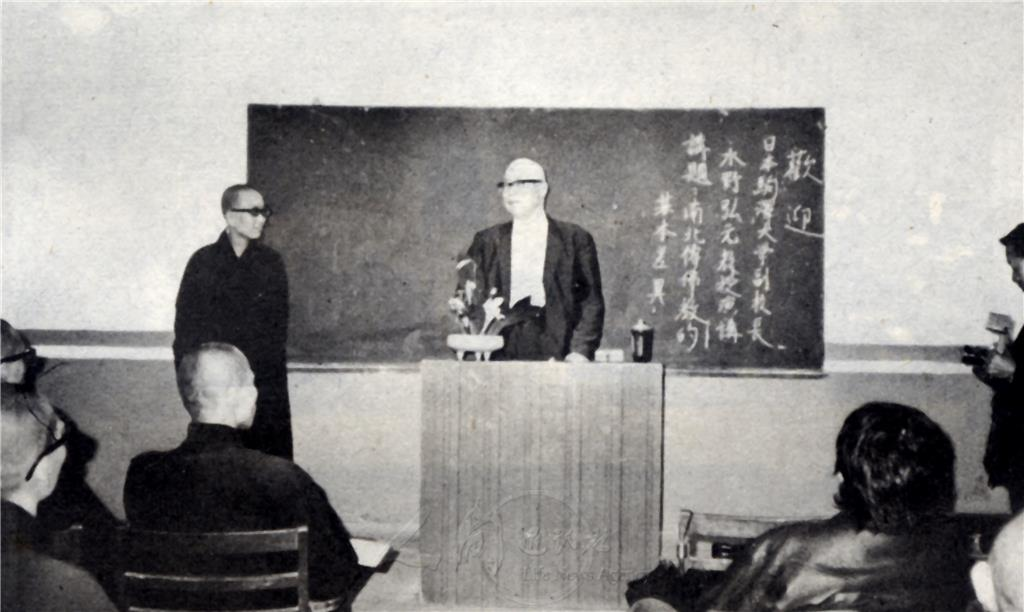
Kogen Mizuno conducting a lecture at Fo Guang Shan in 1978.

Kōgen Mizuno (水野 弘元, Mizuno Kōgen; November 19, 1901 – January 1, 2006) was a Japanese Buddhist monk of the Soto sect and scholar of Early Buddhism. He served as president of Komazawa University where he attained the status of professor emeritus. He held a Doctorate of Letters degree from the (University of Tokyo) and had an honorary Doctorate of Literature degree from Nalanda University.

== Career ==
Mizuno was born in Saga Prefecture in 1901 and attended Soto Zen Daishi Junior High School (known now as Takagawa Gakuen High School/Junior High School) and then Yamaguchi High School. In 1928, he enrolled in Tokyo Imperial University where he graduated from the Department of Indian Philosophy, Faculty of Letters, before entering the same university's graduate school.

In 1935, he became a lecturer at Komazawa University where he was promoted in 1940, as a professor. Mizuno was renowned for specializing in Pali literature. From 1959 to 1962, he was also a professor at the University of Tokyo. From 1976, he served as vice president of Komazawa University and from 1982 as president of Komazawa University. In 1967, he received the Purple Ribbon Medal.

Mizuno died in January 2006 at the age of 104.

== See also ==
- Pre-sectarian Buddhism
- Buddhism in Japan
- Japanese Zen
- Pali literature
- Sōtō Zen
