= Enlightenment in Buddhism =

Highest spiritual goal in Buddhist cultivation

The English term enlightenment is the Western translation of various Buddhist terms, most notably bodhi and vimutti. The abstract noun bodhi (/ˈboʊdi/; Sanskrit: बोधि; Pali: bodhi) means the knowledge or wisdom, or awakened intellect, of a Buddha. (Note: Monier Williams Sanskrit-English Dictionary, bodhi) The verbal root budh- means "to awaken", and its literal meaning is closer to awakening. Although the term buddhi is also used in other Indian philosophies and traditions, its most common usage is in the context of Buddhism. Vimutti is the freedom from or release of the fetters and hindrances.

The term enlightenment was popularised in the Western world through the 19th-century translations of British philologist Max Müller. It has the Western connotation of general insight into transcendental truth or reality. The term is also being used to translate several other Buddhist terms and concepts, which are used to denote (initial) insight (prajna (Sanskrit), wu (Chinese), kensho and satori (Japanese)); knowledge (vidya); the "blowing out" (nirvana) of disturbing emotions and desires; and the attainment of supreme Buddhahood (samyak sam bodhi), as exemplified by Gautama Buddha.

What exactly constituted the Buddha's awakening is unknown. It may have involved the knowledge that liberation was attained by the combination of mindfulness and dhyāna, applied to the understanding of the arising and ceasing of craving. The relation between dhyana and insight is a core problem in the study of Buddhism, and is one of the fundamentals of Buddhist practice.

== Etymology ==
Bodhi, Sanskrit बोधि, (Note: Sanskrit Dictionary for Spoken Sanskrit, "bodhi"..) "awakening", "perfect knowledge", "perfect knowledge or wisdom (by which a man becomes a बुद्ध [Buddha (Note: Sanskrit Dictionary for Spoken Sanskrit, budh)] or जिन [jina, arahant; "victorious", "victor" (Note: Monier Williams Sanskrit-English Dictionary, jina)], the illuminated or enlightened intellect (of a Buddha or जिन)".

The word Bodhi is an abstract noun, formed from the verbal root *budh-, Sanskrit बुध, (Note: Monier Williams Sanskrit-English Dictionary, budh) "to awaken, to know", "to wake, wake up, be awake", "to recover consciousness (after a swoon)", "to observe, heed, attend to".

It corresponds to the verbs bujjhati (Pāli) and bodhati, बोदति, "become or be aware of, perceive, learn, know, understand, awake" (Note: Sanskrit Dictionary for Spoken Sanskrit, bodhati) or budhyate (Sanskrit).

The feminine Sanskrit noun of *budh- is बुद्धि, buddhi, "prescience, intuition, perception, point of view".

== Translation ==
Richard S. Cohen notes that the majority of English books on Buddhism use the term "enlightenment" to translate the term bodhi. The root budh, from which both bodhi and Buddha are derived, means "to wake up" or "to recover consciousness". Cohen notes that bodhi is not the result of an illumination, but of a path of realization, or coming to understanding. The term "enlightenment" is event-oriented, whereas the term "awakening" is process-oriented. The western use of the term "enlighten" has Christian roots, as in Calvin's "It is God alone who enlightens our minds to perceive his truths".

Early 19th-century bodhi was translated as "intelligence". The term "enlighten" was first being used in 1835, in an English translation of a French article, while the first recorded use of the term 'enlightenment' is credited (by the Oxford English Dictionary) to the Journal of the Asiatic Society of Bengal (February 1836). In 1857 The Times used the term "the Enlightened" for the Buddha in a short article, which was reprinted the following year by Max Müller. Thereafter, the use of the term subsided, but reappeared with the publication of Max Müller's Chips from a german Workshop, which included a reprint from the Times article. The book was translated in 1969 into German, using the term "der Erleuchtete". Max Müller was an essentialist, who believed in a natural religion, and saw religion as an inherent capacity of human beings. "Enlightenment" was a means to capture natural religious truths, as distinguished from mere mythology. (Note: See also Lourens Peter van den Bosch, Theosophy or Pantheism? Friedrich Max Müller's Gifford Lectures on Natural Religion: "The three principal themes of his Gifford lectures on natural religion were the discovery of God, the discovery of the soul, and the discovery of the oneness of God and soul in the great religions of the world.") This perspective was influenced by Kantian thought, particularly Kant's definition of the Enlightenment as the free, unimpeded use of reason. Müller's translation echoed this idea, portraying Buddhism as a rational and enlightened religion that aligns with the natural religious truths inherent to human beings.

By the mid-1870s it had become commonplace to call the Buddha "enlightened", and by the end of the 1880s the terms "enlightened" and "enlightenment" dominated the English literature.

== Related terms ==
=== Insight ===
==== Bodhi ====
While the Buddhist tradition regards bodhi as referring to full and complete liberation (samyaksambudh), it also has the more modest meaning of knowing that the path that is being followed leads to the desired goal. According to Johannes Bronkhorst, Tillman Vetter, and K.R. Norman, bodhi was at first not specified. K.R. Norman:

It is not at all clear what gaining bodhi means. We are accustomed to the translation "enlightenment" for bodhi, but this is misleading ... It is not clear what the buddha was awakened to, or at what particular point the awakening came.

According to Norman, bodhi may basically have meant the knowledge that nibbana was attained, due to the practice of dhyana. Originally only "prajna" may have been mentioned, and Tillman Vetter even concludes that originally dhyana itself was deemed liberating, with the stilling of pleasure or pain in the fourth jhana, not the gaining of some perfect wisdom or insight. Gombrich also argues that the emphasis on insight is a later development.

In Theravada Buddhism, bodhi refers to the realisation of the four stages of enlightenment and becoming an Arahant. In Theravada Buddhism, bodhi is equal to supreme insight, and the realisation of the four noble truths, which leads to deliverance. According to Nyanatiloka,

(Through Bodhi) one awakens from the slumber or stupor (inflicted upon the mind) by the defilements (kilesa, q.v.) and comprehends the Four Noble Truths (sacca, q.v.).

This equation of bodhi with the four noble truths is a later development, in response to developments within Indian religious thought, where "liberating insight" was deemed essential for Liberation. The four noble truths as the liberating insight of the Buddha eventually were superseded by Pratītyasamutpāda, the twelvefold chain of causation, and still later by anatta, the emptiness of the self.

In Mahayana Buddhism, bodhi is equal to prajna, insight into the Buddha-nature, sunyata and tathatā. This is equal to the realisation of the non-duality of absolute and relative.

==== Prajna ====
In Theravada Buddhism pannā (Pali) means "understanding", "wisdom", "insight". "Insight" is equivalent to vipassana, insight into the three marks of existence, namely anicca, dukkha and anatta. Insight leads to the four stages of enlightenment and Nirvana.

In Mahayana Buddhism Prajna (Sanskrit) means "insight" or "wisdom", and entails insight into sunyata. The attainment of this insight is often seen as the attainment of "enlightenment".

==== Wu, kensho and satori ====
Wu is the Chinese term for initial insight. Kensho and satori are Japanese terms used in Zen traditions. Kensho means "seeing into one's true nature". Ken means "seeing", sho means "nature", "essence", c.q Buddha-nature. Satori (Japanese) is often used interchangeably with kensho, but refers to the experience of kensho. The Rinzai tradition sees kensho as essential to the attainment of Buddhahood, but considers further practice essential to attain Buddhahood.

East-Asian (Chinese) Buddhism emphasizes insight into Buddha-nature. This term is derived from Indian tathagata-garbha thought, "the womb of the thus-gone" (the Buddha), the inherent potential of every sentient being to become a Buddha. This idea was integrated with the Yogacara-idea of the ālaya vijñāna, and further developed in Chinese Buddhism, which integrated Indian Buddhism with native Chinese thought. Buddha-nature came to mean both the potential of awakening and the whole of reality, a dynamic interpenetration of absolute and relative. In this awakening it is realized that observer and observed are not distinct entities, but mutually co-dependent.

=== Knowledge ===
The term vidhya is being used in contrast to avidhya, ignorance or the lack of knowledge, which binds us to samsara. The Mahasaccaka Sutta (Note: Majjhima Nikaya chapter 36) describes the three knowledges which the Buddha attained:

1. Insight into his past lives
2. Insight into the workings of karma and reincarnation
3. Insight into the Four Noble Truths

According to Bronkhorst, the first two knowledges are later additions, while insight into the four truths represents a later development, in response to concurring religious traditions, in which "liberating insight" came to be stressed over the practice of dhyana.

=== Freedom ===
Vimukthi, also called moksha, means "freedom", "release", "deliverance". Sometimes a distinction is being made between ceto-vimukthi, "liberation of the mind", and panna-vimukthi, "liberation by understanding". The Buddhist tradition recognises two kinds of ceto-vimukthi, one temporarily and one permanent, the last being equivalent to panna-vimukthi. (Note: According to Gombrich, this distinction is artificial, and due to later, too literal, interpretations of the suttas.)

Yogacara uses the term āśraya parāvŗtti, "revolution of the basis",

... a sudden revulsion, turning, or re-turning of the ālaya vijñāna back into its original state of purity [...] the Mind returns to its original condition of non-attachment, non-discrimination and non-duality".

=== Nirvana ===
Nirvana is the "blowing out" of disturbing emotions, which is the same as liberation. The usage of the term "enlightenment" to translate "nirvana" was popularized in the 19th century, in part, due to the efforts of Max Müller, who used the term consistently in his translations.

== Buddha's awakening ==
=== Buddhahood ===
There are three recognized types of Buddha:

- Arhat (Pali: arahant), those who reach Nirvana by following the teachings of the Buddha. Sometimes the term Śrāvakabuddha (Pali: sāvakabuddha) is used to designate this kind of awakened person;
- Pratyekabuddhas (Pali: paccekabuddha), those who reach Nirvana through self-realisation, without the aid of spiritual guides and teachers, but do not teach the Dharma;
- Samyaksambuddha (Pali: samma sambuddha), often simply referred to as Buddha, one who has reached Nirvana by one's own efforts and wisdom and teaches it skillfully to others.

=== Anuttarā-samyak-saṃbodhi ===
Siddhartha Gautama, known as the Buddha, is said to have achieved full awakening, known as samyaksaṃbodhi (Sanskrit; Pāli: sammāsaṃbodhi), "perfect Buddhahood", or anuttarā-samyak-saṃbodhi, "highest perfect awakening". Specifically, anuttarā-samyak-saṃbodhi, literally meaning unsurpassed, complete and perfect enlightenment, is often used to distinguish the enlightenment of a Buddha from that of an Arhat.

The term Buddha and the way to Buddhahood is understood somewhat differently in the various Buddhist traditions. An equivalent term for Buddha is Tathāgata, "the thus-gone".

=== Canonical accounts ===
In the suttapitaka, the Buddhist canon as preserved in the Theravada tradition, a couple of texts can be found in which the Buddha's attainment of liberation forms part of the narrative. (Note: See Majjhima Nikaya chapter 4, 12, 26 & 36)

The Ariyapariyesana Sutta (Majjhima Nikaya 26) describes how the Buddha was dissatisfied with the teachings of Āḷāra Kālāma and Uddaka Rāmaputta, wandered further through Magadhan country, and then found "an agreeable piece of ground" which served for striving. The sutta then only says that he attained Nibbana.

In the Vanapattha Sutta (Majjhima Nikaya 17) the Buddha describes life in the jungle, and the attainment of awakening. The Mahasaccaka Sutta (Majjhima Nikaya 36) describes his ascetic practices, which he abandoned. Thereafter he remembered a spontaneous state of jhana, and set out for jhana-practice. Both suttas narrate how, after destroying the disturbances of the mind, and attaining concentration of the mind, he attained three knowledges (vidhya):

1. Insight into his past lives
2. Insight into the workings of karma and reincarnation
3. Insight into the Four Noble Truths

Insight into the Four Noble Truths is here called awakening. The monk (bhikkhu) has "...attained the unattained supreme security from bondage." Awakening is also described as synonymous with Nirvana, the extinction of the passions whereby suffering is ended and no more rebirths take place. The insight arises that this liberation is certain: "Knowledge arose in me, and insight: my freedom is certain, this is my last birth, now there is no rebirth."

=== Critical assessment ===
Schmithausen (Note: In his often-cited article On some Aspects of Descriptions or Theories of 'Liberating Insight' and 'Enlightenment' in Early Buddhism) notes that the mention of the four noble truths as constituting "liberating insight", which is attained after mastering the Rupa Jhanas, is a later addition to texts such as Majjhima Nikaya 36. Bronkhorst notices that

...the accounts which include the Four Noble Truths had a completely different conception of the process of liberation than the one which includes the Four Dhyanas and the destruction of the intoxicants.

It calls in question the reliability of these accounts, and the relation between dhyana and insight, which is a core problem in the study of early Buddhism. Originally the term prajna may have been used, which came to be replaced by the four truths in those texts where "liberating insight" was preceded by the four jhanas. Bronkhorst also notices that the conception of what exactly this "liberating insight" was developed throughout time. Whereas originally it may not have been specified, later on the four truths served as such, to be superseded by pratityasamutpada, and still later, in the Hinayana schools, by the doctrine of the non-existence of a substantial self or person. And Schmithausen notices that still other descriptions of this "liberating insight" exist in the Buddhist canon:

"that the five Skandhas are impermanent, disagreeable, and neither the Self nor belonging to oneself"; (Note: Majjhima Nikaya 26) "the contemplation of the arising and disappearance (udayabbaya) of the five Skandhas"; (Note: Anguttara Nikaya II.45 (PTS)) "the realisation of the Skandhas as empty (rittaka), vain (tucchaka) and without any pith or substance (asaraka). (Note: Samyutta Nikaya III.140–142 (PTS))

An example of this substitution, and its consequences, is Majjhima Nikaya 36:42–43, which gives an account of the awakening of the Buddha.

== Understanding of bodhi and Buddhahood ==
The term bodhi acquired a variety of meanings and connotations during the development of Buddhist thoughts in the various schools.

=== Early Buddhism ===
In early Buddhism, bodhi carried a meaning synonymous to nirvana, using only a few different metaphors to describe the insight, which implied the extinction of lobha (greed), dosa (hate) and moha (delusion).

=== Theravada ===
In Theravada Buddhism, bodhi and nirvana carry the same meaning: that of being freed from greed, hate and delusion. Bodhi, specifically, refers to the realisation of the four stages of enlightenment and becoming an Arahant. It is equal to supreme insight, the realisation of the four noble truths, which leads to deliverance. Reaching full awakening is equivalent in meaning to reaching Nirvāṇa. (Note: Kusala Bhikshu (March 2008). "Buddhist Enlightenment vs Nirvana". UrbanDharma.org. Archived from the original on 9 February 2015. As of September 2010) Attaining Nirvāṇa is the ultimate goal of Theravada and other śrāvaka traditions. (Note: David Loy (2010). "Enlightenment in Buddhism and Advaita Vedanta: Are Nirvana and Moksha the Same?". Archived from the original on 24 May 2011. As of September 2010) It involves the abandonment of the ten fetters and the cessation of dukkha or suffering. Full awakening is reached in four stages. According to Nyanatiloka,

(Through Bodhi) one awakens from the slumber or stupor (inflicted upon the mind) by the defilements (kilesa, q.v.) and comprehends the Four Noble Truths (sacca', q.v.).

Since the 1980s, western Theravada-oriented teachers have started to question the primacy of insight. According to Thanissaro Bhikkhu, jhana and vipassana (insight) form an integrated practice. Polak and Arbel, following scholars like Vetter and Bronkhorst, argue that right effort, c.q. the four right efforts (sense restraint, preventing the arising of unwholesome states, and the generation of wholesome states), mindfulness, and dhyana form an integrated practice, in which dhyana is the actualisation of insight, leading to an awakened awareness which is "non-reactive and lucid".

=== Mahayana ===
In Mahayana-thought, bodhi is the realisation of the inseparability of samsara and nirvana, and the unity of subject and object. Similar to prajna, the realizing of the Buddha-nature, bodhi realizes sunyata and suchness. In time, the Buddha's awakening came to be understood as an immediate full awakening and liberation, instead of the insight into and certainty about the way to follow to reach enlightenment. In some Zen traditions, however, this perfection came to be relativized again; according to one contemporary Zen master, "Shakyamuni buddha and Bodhidharma are still practicing."

Mahayana discerns three forms of awakened beings:

1. Arahat – Liberation for oneself; (Note: This also includes Pratyekabuddha, but is not being mentioned by Fischer-Schreiber, Ehrhard & Diener (2008))
2. Bodhisattva – Liberation for living beings;
3. Full Buddhahood.

Within the various Mahayana-schools exist various further explanations and interpretations. In Mahāyāna Buddhism, the Bodhisattva is the ideal. The ultimate goal is not only of one's own liberation in Buddhahood, but the liberation of all living beings. The cosmology of Mahayana Buddhism regards a wide range of buddhas and bodhisattvas, who assist humans on their way to liberation.

Nichiren Buddhism, a branch of Mahayana Buddhism, regards Buddhahood as a state of perfect freedom, in which one is awakened to the eternal and ultimate truth that is the reality of all things. This supreme state of life is characterized by boundless wisdom and infinite compassion. The Lotus Sutra reveals that Buddhahood is a potential in the lives of all beings.

==== Buddha-nature ====
In the Tathagatagarbha and Buddha-nature doctrines, bodhi becomes equivalent to the universal, natural and pure state of the mind:

Bodhi is the final goal of a Bodhisattva's career [...] Bodhi is pure universal and immediate knowledge, which extends over all time, all universes, all beings and elements, conditioned and unconditioned. It is absolute and identical with Reality and thus it is Tathata. Bodhi is immaculate and non-conceptual, and it, being not an outer object, cannot be understood by discursive thought. It has neither beginning, nor middle nor end and it is indivisible. It is non-dual (advayam) [...] The only possible way to comprehend it is through samadhi by the yogin.

According to these doctrines, bodhi eternally exists within one's mind, although requiring the mind's defilements to be removed. This vision is expounded in texts such as the Shurangama Sutra and the Uttaratantra.

In Shingon Buddhism as well, the state of Bodhi is regarded as naturally inherent in the mind. Bodhi is the mind's natural and pure state, where no distinction is being made between a perceiving subject and perceived objects. This is also the understanding of Bodhi found in Yogacara Buddhism.

To achieve this vision of non-duality, it is necessary to recognise one's own mind:

... it means that you are to know the inherent natural state of the mind by eliminating the split into a perceiving subject and perceived objects which normally occurs in the world and is wrongly thought to be real. This also corresponds to the Yogacara definition ... that emptiness (sunyata) is the absence of this imaginary split

=== Vajrayana ===
During the development of Mahayana Buddhism, the various strands of thought on Bodhi were continuously being elaborated. Attempts were made to harmonize the various terms.

The Vajrayana Buddhist commentator Buddhaguhya treats various terms as synonyms:

For example, he defines emptiness (sunyata) as suchness (tathata) and says that suchness is the intrinsic nature (svabhava) of the mind which is Enlightenment (bodhi-citta). Moreover, he frequently uses the terms suchness (tathata) and Suchness-Awareness (tathata-jnana) interchangeably. But since Awareness (jnana) is non-dual, Suchness-Awareness is not so much the Awareness of Suchness, but the Awareness which is Suchness. In other words, the term Suchness-Awareness is functionally equivalent to Enlightenment. Finally, it must not be forgotten that this Suchness-Awareness or Perfect Enlightenment is Mahavairocana [the Primal Buddha, uncreated and forever existent]. In other words, the mind in its intrinsic nature is Mahavairocana, whom one "becomes" (or vice versa) when one is perfectly enlightened.

== Bodhi Day ==
Sakyamuni's enlightenment is celebrated on Bodhi Day. In Sri Lanka and Japan, different days are used for this celebration. According to the Theravada tradition in Sri Lanka, Sakyamuni reached Buddhahood at the full moon in May. This is celebrated at Vesākha Pūjā, the full moon in May, known as Sambuddhatva jayanthi (or Sambuddha jayanthi). Secular Bodhi day is celebrated on December 8 in Japan, while China, South Korea and Vietnam, Bodhi Day is observed on the eighth day of the 12th lunar month.

== See also ==
- Buddhism and psychology – Buddhism, Mindfulness and Psychology
- Buddhist philosophy – Buddhist philosophical tradition
- Four stages of enlightenment – Buddhist stages of enlightenment
- Nirvana (Buddhism) – Highest spiritual attainment in Buddhist cultivation
- Dependent Origination – Fundamental Buddhist teaching
- Jhanas – Training of the mind through meditation in Buddhism
- Saṃvega – Spiritual urgency to reach Enlightenment in Buddhist term
- Satori – Japanese Buddhist term for awakening

== Sources ==
- Arbel, Keren (2017), Early Buddhist Meditation: The Four Jhanas as the Actualization of Insight, Routledge, archived from the original on 4 April 2019
- Bowker, John, ed. (1997), The Oxford Dictionary of World Religions, Oxford: Oxford University Press, ISBN 978-0-19213965-8
- Bronkhorst, Johannes (1993), The Two Traditions Of Meditation In Ancient India, Motilal Banarsidass Publ.
- Buswell, Robert, ed. (2004), Encyclopedia of Buddhism, MacMIllan reference USA
- Cohen, Robert S. (2006), Beyond Enlightenment: Buddhism, Religion, Modernity, Routledge
- Faure, Bernard (1991), The Rhetoric of Immediacy. A Cultural Critique of Chan/Zen Buddhism, Princeton, New Jersey: Princeton University Press, ISBN 0-691-02963-6
- Fischer-Schreiber, Ingrid; Ehrhard, Franz-Karl; Diener, Michael S. (2008), Lexicon Boeddhisme. Wijsbegeerte, religie, psychologie, mystiek, cultuur an literatuur, Asoka
- Gimello, Robert M. (2004), "Bodhi", in Buswell, Robert E. (ed.), Encyclopedia of Buddhism, MacMillan, archived from the original on 5 November 2019
- Gombrich, Richard F. (1997), How Buddhism Began. The Conditioned Genesis of the Early Teachings, New Delhi: Munshiram Manoharlal Publishers Pvt. Ltd.
- Gombrich, Richard (2005), Kindness and compassion as a means to Nirvana. In: Paul Williams (ed.), "Buddhism: The early Buddhist schools and doctrinal history; Theravāda doctrine, Volume 2", Taylor & Francis
- Harris, Ishwar C. (2004), The Laughing Buddha of Tofukuji: The Life of Zen Master Keido Fukushima, World Wisdom Books, ISBN 978-0-941532-62-4
- Hodge, Stephen (2003), The Maha-Vairocana-Abhisambodhi Tantra, With Buddhaguya's Commentary, London: RoutledgeCurzon
- Kapleau, Phillip (1989), The Three Pillars of Zen: Teaching, Practice and Enlightenment, New York: Anchor Books, ISBN 0-385-26093-8
- Lai, Whalen (2003), Buddhism in China: A Historical Survey. In Antonio S. Cua (ed.): Encyclopedia of Chinese Philosophy (PDF), New York: Routledge, archived from the original (PDF) on 12 November 2014
- Lusthaus, Dan (1998), Buddhist Philosophy, Chinese. In: Routledge Encyclopedia of Philosophy: Index, Taylor & Francis
- Mäll, Linnart (2005), Studies in the Aṣṭasāhasrikā Prajñāpāramitā and other essays, Motilal Banarsidass Publishers, ISBN 9788120827479
- Nanamoli, Bhikkhu; Bodhi, Bhikkhu (1995), The Middle Length Discourses of the Buddha. A New Translation of the Majjhima Nikaya
- Norman, K. R. (1997), A Philological Approach to Buddhism, The Bukkyo Dendo Kyokai Lectures 1994, School of Oriental and African Studies (University of London)
- Norman, K. R. (2005). Buddhist Forum Volume V: Philological Approach to Buddhism. Routledge. ISBN 978-1-135-75154-8.
- Nyanatiloka (1980), Buddhist Dictionary. Manual of Buddhist terms and Doctrines. Fourth Revised edition, Buddhist Publication Society
- Park, Sung-bae (1983), Buddhist Faith and Sudden Enlightenment, SUNY Press
- Polak, Grzegorz (2011), Reexamining Jhana: Towards a Critical Reconstruction of Early Buddhist Soteriology, UMCS
- Quli, Natalie (2008), "Multiple Buddhist Modernisms: Jhana in Convert Theravada" (PDF), Pacific World 10:225–249, archived (PDF) from the original on 11 March 2019
- Schmithausen, Lambert (1981), On some Aspects of Descriptions or Theories of 'Liberating Insight' and 'Enlightenment' in Early Buddhism". In: Studien zum Jainismus und Buddhismus (Gedenkschrift für Ludwig Alsdorf), hrsg. von Klaus Bruhn und Albrecht Wezler, Wiesbaden 1981, 199–250
- Scott, Rachelle M. (2009), Nirvana for sale? Buddhism, Wealth, and the Dhammakaya Temple in Contemporary Thailand, SUNY Press
- Sebastian, C. D. (2005), Metaphysics and Mysticism in Mahayana Buddhism, Delhi: Sri Satguru Publications
- Snelling, John (1987), The Buddhist handbook. A Complete Guide to Buddhist Teaching and Practice, London: Century Paperbacks
- Vetter, Tilmann (1988), The Ideas and Meditative Practices of Early Buddhism, BRILL
- Warder, A. K. (2000), Indian Buddhism, Delhi: Motilal Banarsidass Publishers

Web references
