= Uddaka Rāmaputta =

Teacher of Samana Gotama before his Enlightenment

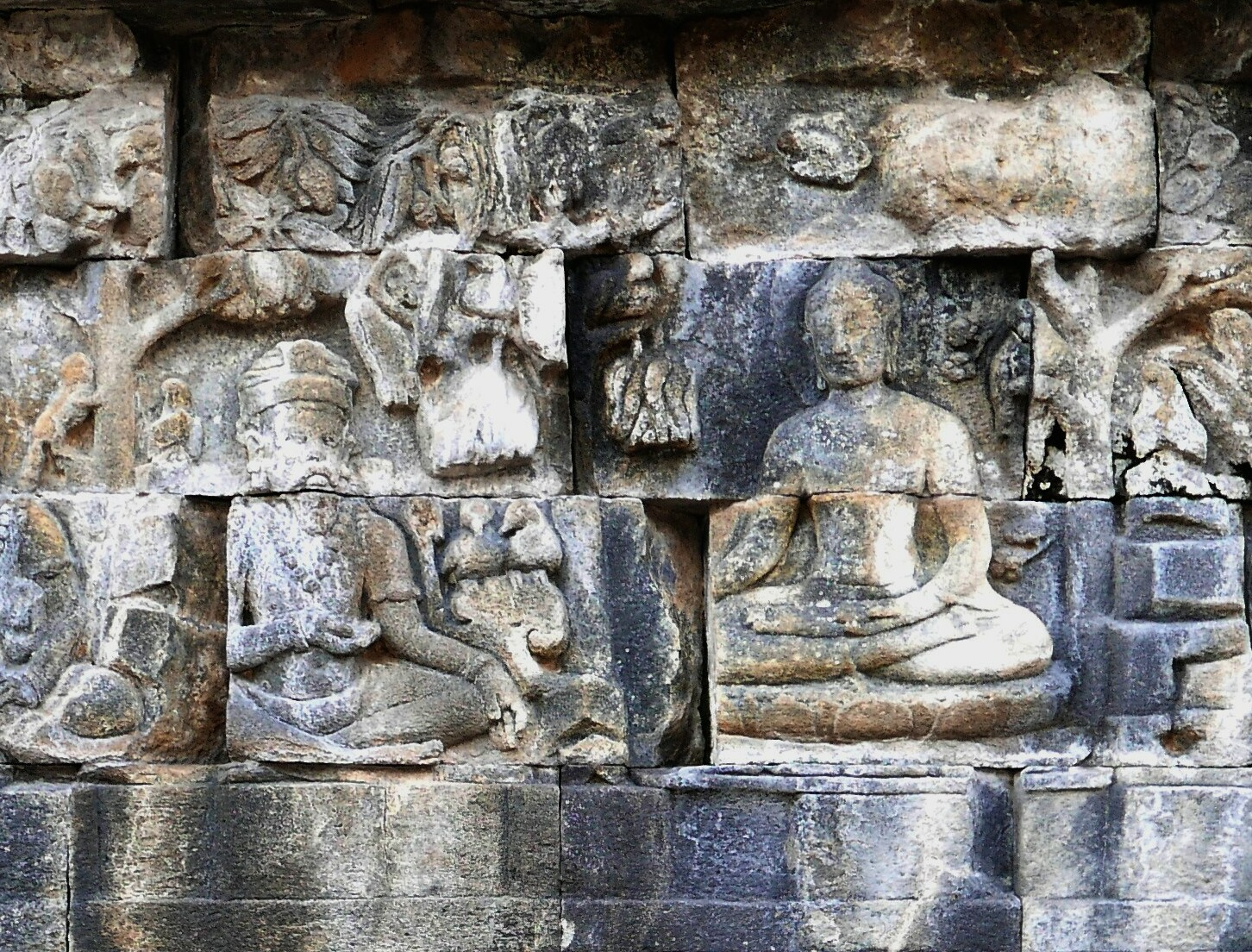
Gautama Buddha meets the ascetic Uddaka Rāmaputta (left) in one of the bas-reliefs recounting the stages leading up to awakening, Lalitavistara, Borobudur Temple Compounds 8th and 9th century, first corridor, main wall.

Uddaka Rāmaputta (Pāli; Sanskrit: Udraka Rāmaputra) was a sramanic teacher of meditation who is mentioned in Jain and Buddhist texts.

== Background ==
The earliest Jain texts, on Dhyana such as Sutrakranga, Antakrta-Dasanga and Rsibhashita, mention Uddaka Rāmaputta, who is said to be the originator of Vipassana and Jain Preksha meditation techniques, and is mentioned in the Buddhist Nikayas as the teacher of some meditation methods to the Buddha. 'Rāmaputta' means 'son of Rāma', who may have been his father or spiritual teacher. Uddaka Rāmaputta taught refined states of meditation known as the jhāna formless attainments (arūpa samāpatti).

== Relationship with Gotama Buddha ==
After his departure from his father's court, Gotama Buddha first went to Āḷāra Kālāma and after following his method was recognized as having equalled his master. Realizing that the methods he had learned so far would not lead to enlightenment, Gotama chose to leave in search of another teacher rather than accept a position as co-leader of Āḷāra Kālāma's community. He found Uddaka Rāmaputta and accepted him as his teacher.

While Āḷāra Kālāma accepted the Buddha as an equal and asked him to lead his community alongside him, Uddaka Rāmaputta acknowledged the Buddha as his superior and equal to his predecessor, Uddaka Rāma, who had actually attained the "sphere of neither perception nor non-perception" (nevasaññānāsaññāyatana), which Rāmaputta had not reached. Uddaka Rāmaputta asked the Buddha to take sole leadership of his students and community, but the Buddha, realizing that this method would not lead to complete liberation, was not satisfied. He chose not to stay with Uddaka and resumed his wandering to deepen his search.

Following his realization of the effective path to liberation, the Buddha first thought of Uddaka Rāmaputta as someone who would be able to understand and realize his Dhamma, but later learned that Uddaka Rāmaputta had already died by that time.

== Sources and historicity ==
Several suttas in the Majjhima Nikaya contain stories about the Bodhisattva's visits to the two teachers, with the Ariyapariyesana Sutta (MN 26) identified as the likely source of subsequent Pali versions. Parallel stories from several different early Buddhist schools are preserved in Sanskrit and Chinese, including within the Mahāvastu. Other references to Uddaka Rāmaputta are scattered through the four Nikayas, with additional mentions in the Vinaya and the commentaries to the Dhammapada.

While Andre Bareau argued that both Uddaka Rāmaputta and Āḷāra Kālāma were fictional creations, later scholars have accepted the possibility that they may have been real historical figures. The surviving sources all agree in placing Uddaka Rāmaputta in Rajagriha during the Buddha's lifetime, despite being drawn from different schools' translations. Hsuan Tsang also recorded legends in his era that associated Uddaka Rāmaputta with the vicinity of Rajagriha. Most traditions have also preserved the distinction between Uddaka Rāmaputta and his father or teacher Uddaka Rāma, but in a few recensions the two figures have been combined.

== Sources ==
- Jain, Sagarmal (2015). Key Chapple, Christopher (ed.). Yoga in Jainism. Routledge. ISBN 978-1138829077.
- Wynne, Alexander (2007), The Origin of Buddhist Meditation, Routledge
