= Āḷāra Kālāma =

Teacher of Samana Gotama before his Enlightenment

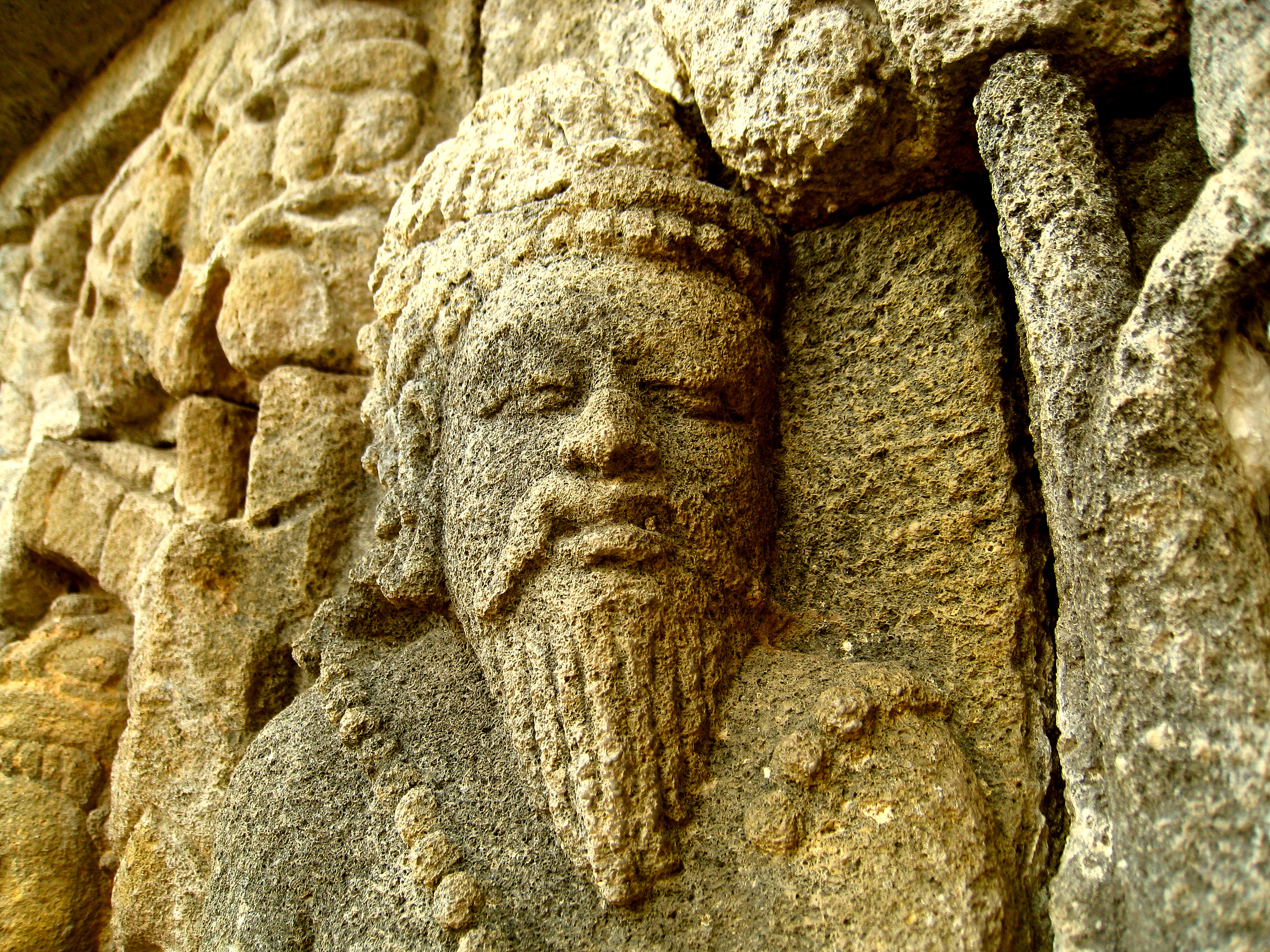
- Detail of Āḷāra from a Lalitavistara relief in Borobudur, Java.

Personal life
- Region: Vajjika League

Religious life
- Religion: Sramana
- School: possibly Samkhya
- Profession: Teacher

Senior posting
- Disciples: Gautama

Āḷāra Kālāma (Pāḷi & Sanskrit Āḷāra Kālāma/ Arāḍa Kālāma]), was a hermit and a teacher of meditation. He was a śramaṇa and, according to Buddhist scriptures, the first teacher of Gautama Buddha. Gautama specifically learned the jhāna state of infinite nothingness and was offered a teaching position by Āḷāra, but Gautama declined because he wanted to further pursue his meditation practice.

== Life ==
Various recensions of the Mahāparinibbāna Sutta and other texts give an account of the Buddha being approached by a minister to the Mallas named Putkasa (Pali: Pukkusa) who told him about his teacher Āḷāra Kālāma's skill in meditation. One day, while deep in meditation, Āḷāra did not hear the sound of a caravan of five hundred wagons that passed by him. The Buddha shared a similar experience; while in the village of Ādumā, a rainstorm had frightened four cowherds and two workmen to death, while the Buddha remained calm due to his prowess in meditation.

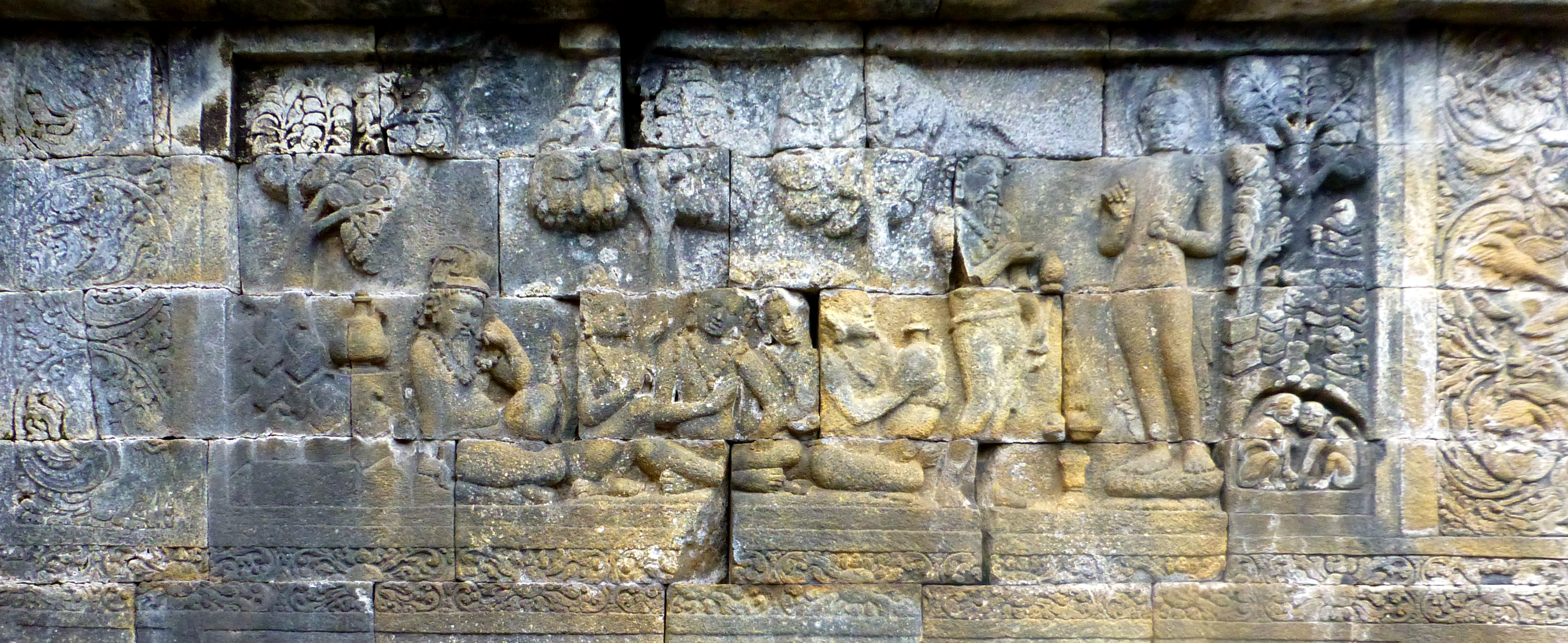
Gautama meeting Alara Kalama and his students.

Āḷāra Kālāma taught a kind of early meditation at Vaiśālī. Āḷāra taught Gotama meditation, especially a jhāna state called the "sphere of nothingness" (ākiṃcanyāyatana). Gotama eventually found himself on par with Āḷāra , who could not teach him more, saying, "It is a gain for us, my friend, a great gain for us, that we have such a companion in the holy life ... As I am, so are you; as you are, so am I. Come friend, let us now lead this community together." Gotama was not interested in staying, as Āḷāra's dharma did not lead to freedom from samsara. After leaving, Siddhartha found a new teacher, Udraka Rāmaputra.

After attaining Enlightenment, the Buddha went to search for Āḷāra Kālāma to teach him the Dhamma, only to find that he had died seven days prior.

== Bibliography ==
- Wynne, Alexander (16 April 2007). The Origin of Buddhist Meditation. Routledge. ISBN 978-1-134-09741-8.
