= Lambert Schmithausen =

German scholar of Buddhism (born 1939)

Lambert Schmithausen (born 17 November 1939 in Cologne, Germany) is a retired professor of Buddhist Studies, having served in positions at the University of Münster and the University of Hamburg (Germany). He is one of the leading academics in the field.

== Biography ==
Schmithausen received a doctorate in philosophy from the University of Vienna in 1963. He was an associate professor of Indology at the University of Münster from 1970 to 1973, moving to the University of Hamburg from 1973 until his retirement in 2005. His main fields of research are the Yogacara tradition of Indian Buddhism and Buddhist ethics, particularly the ethics of nature. He was elected a Corresponding Member of the Austrian Academy of Sciences in 1995.

== Publications ==
The following are publications by Lambert Schmithausen.

=== Monographs ===
1. "Maṇḍanamiśra's Vibhramavivekaḥ, mit einer Studie zu Entwicklung der indischen Irrtumslehre". Vienna 1965. (Österreichische Akademie der Wissenschaften, philosophisch-historische Klasse, Sitzungsberichte, Volume 247. 1. Abhandlung.)
2. "Der Nirvāṇa-Abschnitt in der Viniścayasaṁgrahaṇī der Yogācārabhūmiḥ". Vienna 1969. (Österreichische Akademie der Wissenschaften, philosophisch-historische Klasse, Sitzungsberichte, Volume 264. 2. Abhandlung.)
3. "Alayavijñana: On the Origin and Early Development of a Central Concept of Yogācāra Philosophy" (2 vols.). Tokyo: The International Institute for Buddhist Studies, 1987. (Studia Philologica Buddhica, Monograph Series, IVa and IVb.)
4. "The Problem of the Sentience of Plants in Earliest Buddhism". Tokyo: The International Institute for Buddhist Studies, 1991. (Studia Philologica Buddhica, Monograph Series, VI.)
5. "Plants as sentient beings in earliest Buddhism". The A.L. Basham Lecture for 1989. Canberra: The Australian National University, 1991.
6. "Buddhism and Nature". The Lecture delivered on the Occasion of the EXPO 1990: An Enlarged Version with Notes. Tokyo: The International Institute for Buddhist Studies, 1991. (Studia Philologica Buddhica, Occasional Paper Series, VII.)
7. "Maitrī and Magic: Aspects of the Buddhist Attitude Toward the Dangerous in Nature". Vienna 1997 (Österreichische Akademie der Wissenschaften, philosophisch-historische Klasse, Sitzungsberichte, Volume 652)
8. "On the Problem of the External World in the Ch'eng wei shih lun, Tokyo". The International Institute for Buddhist Studies 2005 (Studia Philologica Buddhica, Occasional Paper Series).

=== Short essays and published lectures ===
1. "Vorstellungsfreie und vorstellende Wahrnehmung bei Śālikanātha". In: Wiener Zeitschrift für die Kunde Süd- und Ostasiens, 7 (1963), 104–115.
2. "Sautrāntika-Voraussetzungen in Viṁśatikā und Triṁśikā". In: Wiener Zeitschrift für die Kunde Süd- und Ostasiens, 11 (1967), 109–136.
3. "'Nijūron' to 'Sanjūron' ni mirareru Kyōryōbu-teki zentei, transl. by Y. Kaji". In: Buddhist Seminar, 37 (1983), 73–96. (Jap. Übers. von 2.)
4. "Zur advaitischen Theorie der Objekterkenntnis". In: Beiträge zur Geistesgeschichte Indiens (Festschrift für Erich Frauwallner, Vienna 1968) = Wiener Zeitschrift für die Kunde Süd- und Ostasiens, 12-13 (1968–1969), 329-360.
5. "Some Remarks on the Problem of the Date of Vācaspatimiśra". In: Journal of the Bihar Research Society, 54 (1968), 158-164.
6. "Ich und Erlösung im Buddhismus". In: Zeitschrift für Missionswissenschaft und Religionswissenschaft, 53 (1969), 157-170.
7. "Zur Literaturgeschichte der älteren Yogācāra-Schule". In: Zeitschrift der Deutschen Morgenländischen Gesellschaft, Supplementa I (1969) (= Vorträge des XVII. Deutschen Orientalistentages in Würzburg), 811-823.
8. "Zu den Rezensionen des Udānavargaḥ". In: Wiener Zeitschrift für die Kunde Südasiens, 14 (1970), 47–124.
9. "Zur Lehre von der vorstellungsfreien Wahrnehmung bei Praśastapāda". In: Wiener Zeitschrift für die Kunde Südasiens, 14 (1970), # "125-129.
10. "Philologische Bemerkungen zum Ratnagotravibhāgaḥ". In: Wiener Zeitschrift für die Kunde Südasiens, 15 (1971), 123–177.
11. "The Definition of Pratyakṣam in the Abhidharmasamuccayaḥ". In: Wiener Zeitschrift für die Kunde Südasiens, 16 (1972), 153–163.
12. "Zu D. Seyfort Rueggs Buch "La théorie du tathāgatagarbha et du gotra"(Besprechungsaufsatz)". In: Wiener Zeitschrift für die Kunde Südasiens, 17 (1973), 123-160.
13. "Spirituelle Praxis und philosophische Theorie im Buddhismus". In: Zeitschrift für Missionswissenschaft und Religionswissenschaft, 57 (1973), 161–186.
14. "On the Problem of the Relation of Spiritual Practice and Philosophical Theory in Buddhism". In: German Scholars on India, ed. by the Cultural Department, Embassy of the Federal Republic of Germany, vol. II, Bombay 1976, 235–250. [Im wesentlichen engl. Fassung der 1. Hälfte von No. 12.]
15. "Die vier Konzentrationen der Aufmerksamkeit. Zur geschichtlichen Entwicklung einer spirituellen Praxis des Buddhismus". In: Zeitschrift für Missionswissenschaft und Religionswissenschaft, 60 (1976), 241–266.
16. "Zu Rahula Walpolas translation of Asaṅgas Abhidharmasamuccaya (Besprechungsaufsatz)". In: Wiener Zeitschrift für die Kunde Südasiens, 20 (1976), 111–122.
17. "Zur buddhistischen Lehre von der dreifachen Leidhaftigkeit". In: Zeitschrift der Deutschen Morgenländischen Gesellschaft, Supplementa III (1977) (= Vorträge des XIX. Deutschen Orientalistentages in Freiburg), 918–931.
18. "Textgeschichtliche Beobachtungen zum 1. Kapitel der Aṣṭasāhasrikā Prajñāpāramitā". In: Prajñāpāramitā and Related Systems (Studies in honor of Edward Conze), ed. by Lewis Lancaster, Berkeley Buddhist Series 1 (1977), 35–80.
19. "Zur Struktur der erlösenden Erfahrung im indischen Buddhismus". In: Transzendenzerfahrung, Vollzugshorizont des Heils, hrsg. von G. Oberhammer, Vienna 1978, 97–119.
20. "Some Aspects of the Conception of Ego in Buddhism: satkāyadṛṣṭi, asmimāna and kliṣṭa-manas (transl. into Japanese by K. Yokoyama)". In: Bukkyō-gaku, 7 (1979), 1–18.
21. "On some Aspects of Descriptions or Theories of 'Liberating Insight' and 'Enlightenment' in Early Buddhism". In: Studien zum Jainismus und Buddhismus (Gedenkschrift für Ludwig Alsdorf), hrsg. von Klaus Bruhn und Albrecht Wezler, Wiesbaden 1981, 199–250.
22. "Versenkungspraxis und erlösende Erfahrung in der Śrāvakabhūmi". In: Epiphanie des Heils, hrsg. von Gerhard Oberhammer, Vienna 1982, 59–85.
23. "Die letzten Seiten der Śrāvakabhūmi". In: Indological and Buddhist Studies (Vol. in Honour of Professor J. W. de Jong on his Sixtieth Birthday), ed. L. A. Hercus et al., Canberra 1982, 457–489.
24. "The Darśanamārga Section of the Abhidharmasamuccaya and its Interpretation by Tibetan Commentators" (with Special Reference to Bu ston Rin chen grub). In: Contributions on Tibetan and Buddhist Religion and Philosophy (Proceedings of the Csoma de Körös Symposium held at Velm-Vienna, Austria, 13–19 September 1981, Vol. 2), ed. by E. Steinkellner and H. Tauscher, Vienna 1983, 259–274.
25. "On the Vijñaptimātra Passage in Saṁdhinirmocanasūtra VIII.7". In: Acta Indologica VI (1984) = Studies of Mysticism in Honour of the 1150th Anniversary of Kobo-Daishi's Nirvāṇam, 433–455.
26. "Buddhismus und Natur". In: Die Verantwortung des Menschen für eine bewohnbare Welt in Christentum, Hinduismus und Buddhismus, hrsg. von R. Panikkar und W. Strolz, Freiburg/Basel/Vienna 1985, 100–133.
27. "Once again Mahāyānasaṁgraha I.8". In: Buddhism and Its Relation to Other Religions (Essays in Honour of Dr. Shōzen Kumoi on His Seventieth Birthday), Kyoto 1985, 139–160.
28. "Critical Response". In: Karma and Rebirth, ed. Ronald W. Neufeldt, Albany 1986, 203–230.
29. "Zur Liste der 57 'kleineren Fehler' in der Ratnāvalī und zum Problem der Schulzugehörigkeit Nāgārjunas". In: Studien zur Indologie und Iranistik 11/12 (1986), 203–232.
30. "Beiträge zur Schulzugehörigkeit und Textgeschichte kanonischer und postkanonischer Materialien". In: Zur Schulzugehörigkeit von Werken der Hīnayāna-Literatur, hrsg. von Heinz Bechert, 2. Teil, Göttingen 1987 (Abhandlungen der Akademie der Wissenschaften in Göttingen, Philologisch-historische Klasse, 3. Folge, No. 154), 304-406.
31. "Buddhism and Nature". In: Buddhism and Nature – Proceedings of an International Symposium on the Occasion of EXPO 1990. Tokyo: The International Institute for Buddhist Studies, 1991, 22-34. [Vortrag, Basis von Monographie No. 5]
32. "Budismo y naturaleza". In: Revista de Estudios Budistas 1 (1991), 63-85 (Spanish transl. of No. 30).
33. "Yogācārabhūmi: Sopadhikā and Nirupadhikā Bhūmiḥ". In: Papers in Honour of Prof. Dr. Ji Xianlin on the Occasion of His 80th Birthday, Jiangxi: Jiangxi renmin chubanshe 1991, vol. 2, 687-709.
34. "A Note on Vasubandhu and the Laṅkāvatārasūtra". In: Asiatische Studien XLVI.1 (1992) (Études bouddhiques offertes à Jaques May), 392-397.
35. "An Attempt to Estimate the Distance in Time between Aśoka and the Buddha in Terms of Doctrinal History". In: Heinz Bechert (Ed.), The Dating of the Historical Buddha (Die Datierung des historischen Buddha), Part 2 (Abhandlungen der Akademie der Wissenschaften in Göttingen, Philologisch-historische Klasse, Dritte Folge, No. 194), Göttingen 1992, 110-147.30.
36. "Zur Textgeschichte der Pañcāgnividyā". In: Wiener Zeitschrift für die Kunde Südasiens 38 (1994), 43-60.
37. "On the Status of Plants in Earliest Buddhism". In: Buddhism into the Year 2000 (International Conference Proceedings). Bangkok, Los Angeles: Dhammakaya Foundation 1994, 49-65. [entspricht im wesentlichen der ersten Hälfte vonSelbständige Schriften 4A.]
38. "Buddhism and Environmental Ethics: Some Reflections". In: Buddhism into the Year 2000 (International Conference Proceedings). Bangkok, Los Angeles: Dhammakaya Foundation 1994, 181-201.
39. "Mensch, Tier und Pflanze und der Tod in den älteren Upaniṣaden". In: Gerhard Oberhammer (Hrsg.), Im Tod gewinnt der Mensch sein Selbst: Das Phänomen des Todes in asiatischer und abendländischer Religion, Vienna 1995, 43-74.
40. "Man, Animals and Plants in the Rebirth Passages of the Early Upaniṣads". In: Journal of the Royal Asiatic Society of Sri Lanka, New Series, Vol. 38 (1993/1994), Colombo 1995, 141-162. [Modifizierte Englische Fassung von 37]
41. "Buddhism and Ecological Responsibility". In: Lawrence Surendra, Klaus Schindler, Prasann Ramaswamy (Hrsg.), Stories they tell — A dialogue among philosophers, scientists and environmentalists. Madras 1996, 57-75; 83-93. [Enthält viele, z.T. sinnentstellende Druckfehler.]
42. "Buddhismus und Ökologische Ethik". In: Bodhiblatt 6 (Frühling/Sommer 1997), 33-40; 7 (Herbst 1997), 16-24; 8 (Frühling/Sommer 1998), 10-17; 9 (Frühling/Sommer 2000), 9-16. [Im Prinzip die deutsche Entsprechung zu 38. Leider ebenfalls viele Druckfehler.]
43. "Buddhismus und Glaubenskriege". In: Peter Herrmann (Hrsg.), Glaubenskriege in Vergangenheit und Gegenwart (Veröffentlichungen der Joachim Jungius-Gesellschaft der Wissenschaften, Hamburg, No. 83), Göttingen 1996, 63-92.
44. "The Early Buddhist Tradition and Ecological Ethics". In: Journal of Buddhist Ethics 4 (1997), 1-74.
45. "Das Jñānaprasthāna-Fragment SHT III 823". In: Petra Kieffer-Pülz u. Jens-Uwe Hartmann (Hrsg.), Bauddhavidyā¬sudhākaraḥ: Studies in Honour of Heinz Bechert on the Occasion of His 65th Birthday. Swisttal-Odendorf 1997 (Indica et Tibetica 30), 559-569.
46. "Tier und Mensch im Buddhismus". In: Paul Münch with Reiner Walz (Hrsg.), Tiere und Menschen — Geschichte und Aktualität eines prekären Verhältnisses. Paderborn 1998, 179-224 (zusammen mit M. Maithrimurthi).
47. "Das Jñānaprasthāna-Fragment SHT VII 1752". In: Paul Harrison and Gregory Schopen (eds.), Sūryacandrāya. Essays in Honour of Akira Yuyama on the Occasion of His 65th Birthday. Swisttal-Odendorf 1998, 143-156.
48. "A Further Note on Hetucakraḍamaru 8-9". In: Journal of Indian Philosophy 27 (1999), 79-82.
49. "Heilsvermittelnde Aspekte der Natur im Buddhismus". In: Gerhard Oberhammer u. Marcus Schmücker (Hrsg.), Raum-zeitliche Vermittlung der Transzendenz — Zur "sakramentalen" Dimension religiöser Traditionen. Vienna 1999, 229-262.
50. "Aspects of the Buddhist Attitude towards War". In: Jan E.M Houben and Karel R. van Kooij, Violence Denied — Violence, Non-Violence and the Rationalization of Violence in South Asian Cultural History. Leiden etc. 1999, 45-67.
51. "Gleichmut und Mitgefühl. Zu Spiritualität und Heilsziel des älteren Buddhismus". In: Andreas Bsteh (Hrsg.), Der Buddhismus als Anfrage an christliche Theologie und Philosophie (Studien zur Religionstheologie Band 5). Mödling: St. Gabriel 2000, 119-136.
52. "Chōzen to Dōjō. Shoki-bukkyō ni mirareru seishin-sei to kyūsai (ri) no mokuteki 超然と同情初期仏教にみられる精神性と救済(利)の目的. transl. of Naoki Saitō 斎藤直樹". In: Tetsugaku 哲学 108 (2002), 67-99. [Jap. translation of No. 47]
53. "Mitleid und Leerheit. Zu Spiritualität und Heilsziel des Mahāyāna". In: Andreas Bsteh (Hrsg.), Der Buddhismus als Anfrage an christliche Theologie und Philosophie (Studien zur Religionstheologie, Volume 5). Mödling: St. Gabriel 2000, 437-455.
54. "Rembin to kūshō. Daijō ni okeru seishinsei to kyūsai (ri) no shūkyoku 憐憫と空性: 大乗における精神性と救済(利)の終極". transl. of Naoki Saitō 斎藤直樹. In: Tetsugaku 哲学 109 (2003), 71-100. [Jap. translation of No. 48].
55. "Essen ohne zu töten. Zur Frage von Fleischverzehr und Vegetarismus im Buddhismus". In: Perry Schmidt-Leukel (Hrsg.), Die Religionen und das Essen (Diederichs Gelbe Reihe Bd. 163). Kreuzlingen u. München: Diederichs 2000, 145-202.
56. "Zwei Fragmente aus dem Prakaraṇa". In: Christine Chojnacki, Jens-Uwe Hartmann u. Volker M. Tschannerl (Hrsg.), Vividharatnakaraṇḍaka. Festgabe für Adelheid Mette. (Indica et Tibetica Bd. 37) Swisttal-Odendorf 2000, 481-492.
57. "Buddhism and the Ethics of Nature — Some Remarks". In: The Eastern Buddhist (New Series) 32.2 (2000), 26-78.
58. "Bukkyō to shizen-rinri — jakkan no shoken. transl. of Takashi Iwata et al.". In: Tōyō no shisō to shūkyō. 18 (2001): 1-41 u. 19 (2002), 1-32. [Jap. translation of No. 51.]
59. "On Three Yogācārabhūmi Passages Mentioning the Three Svabhāvas or Lakṣaṇas". In: Jonathan A. Silk (Hrsg.), Wisdom, Compassion, and the Search for Understanding. The Buddhist Studies Legacy of Gadjin M. Nagao. Honolulu: University of Hawai'i Press 2000, 245–263.
60. "Zur zwölfgliedrigen Formel des Entstehens in Abhängigkeit". In: Hōrin 7 (2000): 41–76.
61. "A Note on the Origin of Ahiṁsā". In: Ryutaro Tsuchida and Albrecht Wezler (Hrsg.), Harānandalaharī. Volume in Honour of Professor Minoru Hara on his Seventieth Birthday. Reinbek: Dr. Inge Wezler 2000, 253–282.
62. "Aldous Huxley’s View of Nature". In: C. C. Barfoot (ed.), Aldous Huxley between East and West. Amsterdam - New York: Rodopi 2001, 151–173.
63. "Fragments of an Early Commentary. Zus. mit Jens Braarvig u. Lore Sander". In: Jens Braarvig (ed.), Manuscripts in the Schøyen Collection. Oslo: Hermes Publishing 2002, 249–254.
64. "The Case of Vegetarianism – Buddhist Perspectives". In: Journal of Indian Philosophy (Korean Society for Indian Philosophy) 12.1 (2002), 309–329.
65. "Ein weiteres Fragment aus dem Prakaraṇa: SHT VII 1697". In: Wiener Zeitschrift für die Kunde Südasiens 46 (2002): 51–103.
66. "Zum Problem der Gewalt im Buddhismus". In: Adel Theodor Khoury et al. (Hrsg.), Krieg und Gewalt in den Weltreligionen. Freiburg/Basel/Wien: Herder 2003: 83–98 u. 133–138.
67. "Benefiting Oneself and Benefiting Others: A Note on Aṅguttaranikāya 7.64". In: H.W. Bodewitz and Minoru Hara (eds.), Gedenkschrift J.W. de Jong. Tokyo: The International Institute for Buddhist Studies 2004 (Studia Philologica Buddhica, Monograph Series, XVII): 149–160.
68. "Einige besondere Aspekte der „Bodhisattva-Ethik“ in Indien und ihre Hintergründe". In: Hōrin10 (2003): 21–46.
69. "Artikel Buddhism [Indian]". In: Bron R. Taylor (ed.), The Encyclopedia of Religion and Nature. London & New York: Thoemmes Continuum 2005: I 232–236.
70. "Ein tibetochinesisches Bahrtuch: Zu den Texten". In: Die Welt des tibetischen Buddhismus. Mitteilungen aus dem Museum für Völkerkunde Hamburg, Neue Folge Bd. 36 (2005): 605–610.
71. "Man and World: On the Myth of Origin of the Aggaññasutta". In: Buddhism and Nature (Bukkyō to Shizen). Supplement to the Bulletin of the Research Institute of Bukkyo University, Kyoto 2005:165-182.
72. "Meat-eating and nature: Buddhist perspectives". In: Buddhism and Nature (Bukkyō to Shizen). Supplement to the Bulletin of the Research Institute of Bukkyo University, Kyoto 2005:183-201.
73. "Nichtselbst, Leerheit und altruistische Ethik im Bodhicaryāvatāra". In:Karin Preisendanz (Hrsg.), Expanding and Merging Horizons. Contributions to South Asian and Cross-Cultural Studies in Commemoration of Wilhelm Halbfass. Vienna: Österreichische Akademie der Wissenschaften 2007: 551–570.
74. "Zur Frage, ob ein Bodhisattva unter bestimmten Voraussetzungen in einer neutralen Geisteshaltung (avyākṛta-citta) töten darf". In: Konrad Klaus und Jens-Uwe Hartmann (Hrsg.), Indica et Tibetica. Festschrift für Michael Hahn, Vienna: Arbeitskreis für Tibetische und Buddhistische Studien, Universität Vienna 2007 (Wiener Studien zur Tibetologie und Buddhismuskunde, Heft 66): 423–440.
75. "Aspects of Spiritual Practice in Early Yogācāra". In: Journal of the International College for Postgraduate Buddhist Studies (Tokyo) 11 (2007): 213–244.
