= Pratītyasamutpāda =

Fundamental Buddhist teaching

Translations of pratītyasamutpāda/paṭiccasamuppāda
- English: dependent origination, dependent arising, interdependent co-arising, conditioned arising
- Sanskrit: प्रतीत्यसमुत्पाद 𑖢𑖿𑖨𑖝𑖱𑖝𑖿𑖧𑖭𑖦𑖲𑖝𑖿𑖢𑖯𑖟 (IAST: pratītyasamutpāda)
- Pali: पटिच्चसमुप्पाद (paṭiccasamuppāda)
- Bengali: প্রতীত্যসমুৎপাদ (prôtīttôsômutpad)
- Burmese: ပဋိစ္စ သမုပ္ပါဒ် IPA: [bədeiʔsa̰ θəmouʔpaʔ]
- Chinese: 緣起 (Pinyin: yuánqǐ)
- Indonesian: kemunculan bersebab, kemunculan bergantung, dependensi kemunculan, sebab musabab yang saling bergantung
- Japanese: 縁起 (Rōmaji: engi)
- Khmer: បដិច្ចសមុប្បាទ (padecchak samubbat)
- Korean: 연기 (RR: yeongi)
- Sinhala: පටිච්චසමුප්පාද
- Tagalog: Platityasamutpada
- Tibetan: རྟེན་ཅིང་འབྲེལ་བར་འབྱུང་བ་ (Wylie: rten cing 'brel bar 'byung ba THL: ten-ching drelwar jungwa)
- Thai: ปฏิจจสมุปบาท (RTGS: patitcha samupabat)
- Vietnamese: duyên khởi (Chữ Nôm: 縁起)

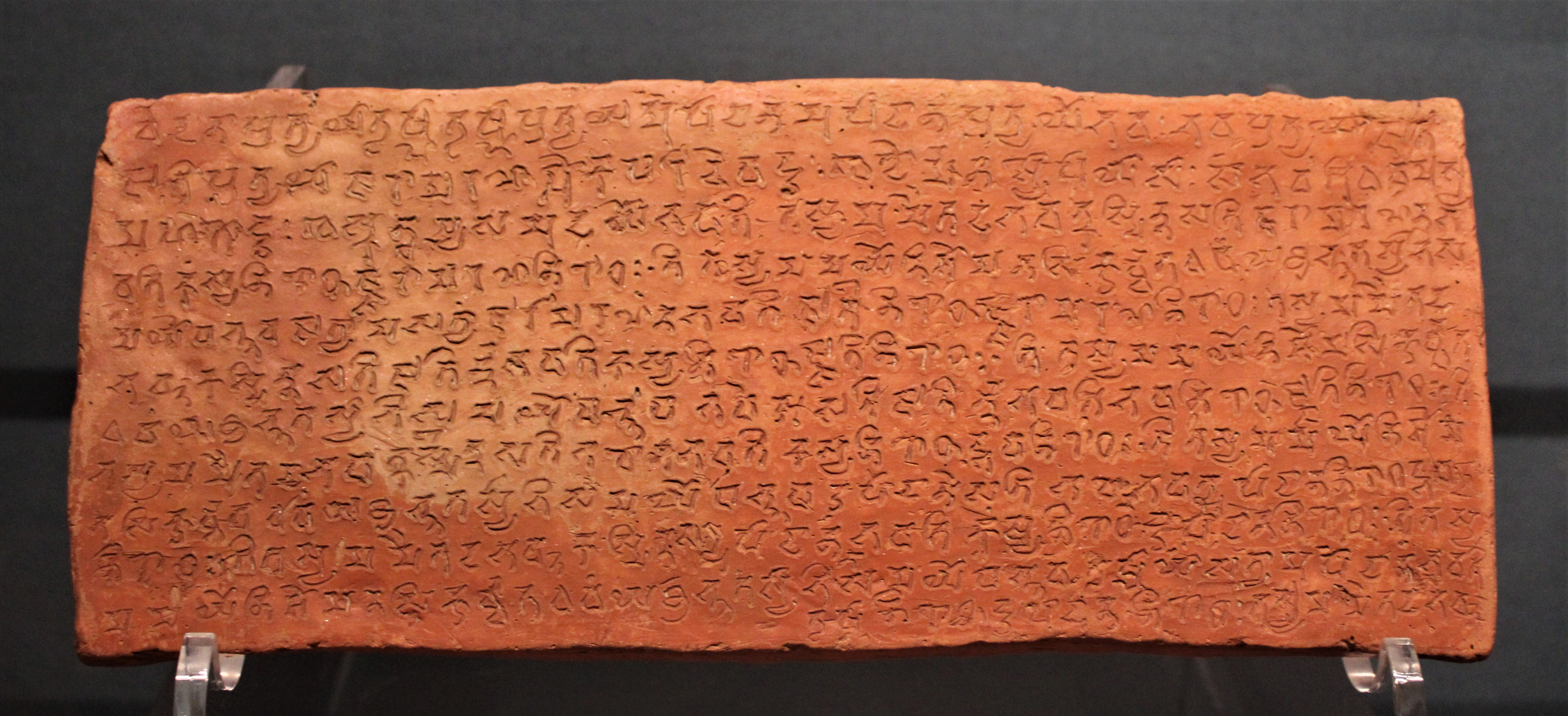
Brick inscribed with the Sutra on Dependent Origination. Found in Gopalpur, Gorakhpur District, Uttar Pradesh. Dated c. 500 CE, Gupta period. Ashmolean Museum.

Pratītyasamutpāda (Sanskrit: प्रतीत्यसमुत्पाद, Pāli: paṭiccasamuppāda), commonly translated as dependent origination, or dependent arising, is a key doctrine in Buddhism shared by all schools of Buddhism. (Note: The Pratītyasamutpāda doctrine, states Mathieu Boisvert, is a fundamental tenet of Buddhism and it may be considered as "the common denominator of all the Buddhist traditions throughout the world, whether Theravada, Mahayana or Vajrayana".) It states that all conditioned dharmas (phenomena) arise in dependence upon other dharmas: "if this exists, that exists; if this ceases to exist, that also ceases to exist". The basic principle is that all conditioned things (saṅkhata dharmas, conditioned phenomena, conditioned principles) arise in dependence upon other things.

The doctrine includes depictions of the arising of suffering (anuloma-paṭiccasamuppāda, "with the grain", forward conditionality) and depictions of how the chain can be reversed (paṭiloma-paṭiccasamuppāda, "against the grain", reverse conditionality). These processes are expressed in various lists of dependently originated phenomena, the most well-known of which is the twelve links or nidānas (Pāli: dvādasanidānāni, Sanskrit: dvādaśanidānāni). The traditional interpretation of these lists is that they describe the process of a sentient being's rebirth in saṃsāra, and the resultant duḥkha (suffering, pain, unsatisfactoriness), and they provide an analysis of rebirth and suffering that avoids positing an atman (unchanging self or eternal soul). The reversal of the causal chain is explained as leading to the cessation of rebirth (and thus, the cessation of suffering).

Another interpretation regards the lists as describing the arising of mental processes and the resultant notion of "I" and "mine" that leads to grasping and suffering. Several modern western scholars argue that there are inconsistencies in the list of twelve links, and regard it to be a later synthesis of several older lists and elements, some of which can be traced to the Vedas.

The doctrine of dependent origination appears throughout the early Buddhist texts. It is the main topic of the Nidāna Saṃyutta of the Theravada school's Saṃyutta Nikāya (henceforth SN). A parallel collection of discourses also exists in the Chinese Saṁyukta Āgama (henceforth SA).

== Overview ==
Dependent origination is a philosophically complex concept, subject to a large variety of explanations and interpretations. As the interpretations often involve specific aspects of dependent origination, they are not necessarily mutually exclusive to each other.

Dependent origination can be contrasted with the classic Western concept of causation in which an action by one thing is said to cause a change in another thing. Dependent origination instead views the change as being caused by many factors, not just one or even a few.

The principle of dependent origination has a variety of philosophical implications.

- As an ontological principle (i.e., as a metaphysical concept about the nature of existence), it holds that all phenomena arise from other, pre-existing phenomena, and in turn current phenomena condition future phenomena. As such, everything in the world has been produced by causes. Traditionally, this is also closely connected to the Buddhist doctrine of rebirth, and how rebirth occurs without a fixed self or soul, but as a process conditioned by various phenomena and their relations.
- As an epistemological principle (i.e., as a theory about knowledge), it holds that there are no permanent and stable things, though there are classes of permanent phenomena viz. space (vacuum), cessations (including nirvana), and suchness (the absence of self, namely, anatta). Because everything is dependently originated, nothing is permanent (hence the Buddhist concept of impermanence, anicca) and nothing has any self-nature or essence (anatta). Consequently, all phenomena lack essence. In various traditions, this is closely associated with the doctrine of emptiness (śūnyatā).
- As a phenomenological or psychological principle, it refers to the workings of the mind and how suffering, craving, and self-view arise. This can refer to how different mental states condition each other over time, or to how different mental phenomena condition each other in a single moment.

== Etymology ==
Pratītyasamutpāda consists of two terms:

- Pratītya: "having depended". The term appears in the Vedas and Upanishads (Note: such as hymns 4.5.14, 7.68.6 of the Rigveda and 19.49.8 of Atharvaveda) in the sense of "confirmation, dependence, acknowledge origin". The Sanskrit root of the word is prati* whose forms appear more extensively in the Vedic literature, and it means "to go towards, go back, come back, to approach" with the connotation of "observe, learn, convince oneself of the truth of anything, be certain of, believe, give credence, recognize". In other contexts, a related term pratiti* means "going towards, approaching, insight into anything".
- Samutpāda: "arising", "rise, production, origin" In Vedic literature, it means "spring up together, arise, come to pass, occur, effect, form, produce, originate".

Pratītyasamutpāda has been translated into English as dependent origination, dependent arising, interdependent co-arising, conditioned arising, and conditioned genesis. (Note: The term pratītyasamutpāda been translated into English as conditioned arising, conditioned genesis, dependent arising, (Note: The Dalai Lama explains: "In Sanskrit the word for dependent-arising is pratityasamutpada. The word pratitya has three different meanings—meeting, relying, and depending—but all three, in terms of their basic import, mean dependence. Samutpada means arising. Hence, the meaning of pratityasamutpada is that which arises in dependence upon conditions, in reliance upon conditions, through the force of conditions.") dependent co-arising, or dependent origination)

Jeffrey Hopkins notes that terms synonymous to pratītyasamutpāda are apekṣasamutpāda and prāpyasamutpāda.

The term may also refer to the twelve nidānas, Pali: dvādasanidānāni, Sanskrit: dvādaśanidānāni, from dvādaśa ("twelve") + nidānāni (plural of "nidāna", "cause, motivation, link"). (Note: The Nalanda Translation Committee states: "Pratitya-samutpada is the technical name for the Buddha's teaching on cause and effect, in which he demonstrated how all situations arise through the coming together of various factors. In the hinayana, it refers in particular to the twelve nidānas, or links in the chain of samsaric becoming.") Generally speaking, in the Mahayana tradition, pratityasamutpada (Sanskrit) is used to refer to the general principle of interdependent causation, whereas in the Theravada tradition, paticcasamuppāda (Pali) is used to refer to the twelve nidānas.

== Dependent origination in early Buddhism ==
=== The principle of conditionality ===
In the early Buddhist texts, the basic principle of conditionality is called by different names such as "the certainty (or law) of dhamma" (dhammaniyāmatā), "suchness of dharma" (法如; *dharmatathatā), the "enduring principle" (ṭhitā dhātu), "specific conditionality" (idappaccayatā) and "dhammic nature" (法爾; dhammatā). This principle is expressed in its most general form as follows: (Note: The general formula can be found in the following discourses in the Pali Canon: MN 79, MN 115, SN12.21, SN 12.22, SN 12.37, SN 12.41, SN 12.49, SN 12.50, SN 12.61, SN 12.62, SN 55.28, AN 10.92, Ud. 1.1 (first two lines), Ud. 1.2 (last two lines), Ud. 1.3, Nd2, Patis. According to Choong (2000) p. 157, the formula also appears in the Saṁyuktāgama (SA 293, 296-302, 349-350, 358, 369).)

When this exists, that comes to be. With the arising (uppada) of this, that arises. When this does not exist, that does not come to be. With the cessation (nirodha) of this, that ceases.

— Samyutta Nikaya 12.61.

According to Paul Williams "this is what causation is for early Buddhist thought. It is a relationship between events, and is what we call it when if X occurs Y follows, and when X does not occur Y does not follow." Richard Gombrich writes that this basic principle that "things happen under certain conditions" means that the Buddha understood experiences as "processes subject to causation". Bhikkhu Bodhi writes that specific conditionality "is a relationship of indispensability and dependency: the indispensability of the condition (e.g. birth) to the arisen state (e.g. aging and death), the dependency of the arisen state upon its condition."

Peter Harvey states this means that "nothing (except nirvāna) is independent. The doctrine thus complements the teaching that no permanent, independent self can be found." Ajahn Brahm argues that the grammar of the above passage indicates that one feature of the Buddhist principle of causality is that "there can be a substantial time interval between a cause and its effect. It is a mistake to assume that the effect follows one moment after its cause, or that it appears simultaneously with its cause."

=== Variable phenomena, invariant principle ===
According to the Paccaya sutta (SN 12.20 and its parallel in SA 296), dependent origination is the basic principle of conditionality which is at play in all conditioned phenomena. This principle is invariable and stable, while the "dependently arisen processes" (paṭiccasamuppannā dhammā) are variable and impermanent. (Note: Choong Mun-keat translates these two as "the dharma of arising by causal condition and the dharmas arisen by causal condition" in his translation of SA 296. According to Choong, these terms refer to two ideas: (1) a natural law of phenomena and (2) causal factors respectively.)

Peter Harvey argues that there is an "overall Basic Pattern that is Dhamma" within which "specific basic patterns (dhammas) flow into and nurture each other in complex, but set, regular patterns.".

==== Invariant principle ====
According to the Paccaya sutta (SN 12.20) and its parallel, this natural law of this/that conditionality is independent of being discovered by a Buddha (a "Tathāgata"), just like the laws of physics. The Paccaya sutta states that whether or not there are Buddhas who see it "this elemental fact (dhātu, or "principle") just stands (thitā), this basic-pattern-stability (dhamma-tthitatā), this basic-pattern-regularity (dhamma-niyāmatā): specific conditionality (idappaccayatā)."

Bhikkhu Sujato translates the basic description of the stability of dependent origination as "the fact that this is real, not unreal, not otherwise". The Chinese parallel at SA 296 similarly states that dependent origination is "the constancy of dharmas, the certainty of dharmas, suchness of dharmas, no departure from the true, no difference from the true, actuality, truth, reality, non-confusion". According to Harvey, these passages indicate that conditionality is "a principle of causal regularity, a Basic Pattern (Dhamma) of things" which can be discovered, understood and then transcended.

==== Variable phenomena – dependently arisen processes ====
The principle of conditionality, which is real and stable, is contrasted with the "dependently arisen processes", which are described as "impermanent, conditioned, dependently arisen, of a nature to be destroyed, of a nature to vanish, of a nature to fade away, of a nature to cease." SA 296 describes them simply as "arising thus according to causal condition, these are called dharmas arisen by causal condition."

=== Conditionality and liberation ===
==== The Buddha's discovery of conditionality ====
Regarding the arising of suffering, SN 12.10 discusses how before the Buddha's awakening, he searched for the escape from suffering as follows: "when what exists is there old age and death? What is a condition for old age and death?", discovering the chain of conditions as expressed in the twelve nidanas and other lists. MN 26 also reports that after the Buddha's awakening, he considered that dependent origination was one of the two principles which were "profound (gambhira), difficult to see, difficult to understand, peaceful, sublime, beyond the scope of mere reasoning (atakkāvacara), subtle." The other principle which is profound and difficult to see is said to be Nirvana, "the stopping, or transcending, of conditioned co-arising" (Harvey). (Note: SN 20:7 (SĀ 1258) has the Buddha state that his disciples should study "those discourses taught by the Tathāgata that are profound, profound in meaning, transmundane, connected with emptiness". According to Hùifēng, in the early sources (SN 6:1, MN 26 and 27:7, as well as DN 15, MĀ 97 and DĀ 13), terms such as "profound" (gambhīra) as well as related terms such as "hard to see", "subtle" and "not within the sphere of reasoning" are used to describe dependent origination (as well as its reversal, dependent cessation).)

In the Mahānidānasutta (DN 15) the Buddha states that dependent origination is "deep and appears deep", and that it is "because of not understanding and not penetrating this teaching" that people become "tangled like a ball of string" in views (diṭṭhis), samsara, rebirth and suffering. SN 12.70 and its counterpart SA 347 state that "knowledge of Dhamma-stability" (dhamma-tthiti-ñānam) comes first, then comes knowledge of nirvana (nibbane-ñānam). However, while the process which leads to nirvāna is conditioned, nirvāna itself is called "unborn, unbecome, unmade, unconstructed" (Ud. 80–1). The Milinda Panha compares to how a mountain is not dependent on the path that leads to it (Miln. 269)". According to Harvey, since it is "not co-arisen (asamuppana) (It. 37–8), nirvāna is not something that is conditionally arisen, but is the stopping of all such processes."

==== Seeing the dharma ====
MN 28 associates knowing dependent origination with knowing the dharma:

"One who sees dependent origination sees the Dharma. One who sees the Dharma sees dependent origination." And these five grasping aggregates are indeed dependently originated. The desire, adherence, attraction, and attachment for these five grasping aggregates is the origin of suffering. Giving up and getting rid of desire and greed for these five grasping aggregates is the cessation of suffering.

A well-known early exposition of the basic principle of causality is said to have led to the stream entry of Sariputta and Moggallāna. This ye dharmā hetu phrase, which appears in the Vinaya (Vin.I.40) and other sources, states:

Of those dharmas which arise from a cause, the Tathagata has stated the cause, and also their cessation.

A similar phrase is uttered by Kondañña, the first convert to realize awakening at the end of the first sermon given by the Buddha: "whatever has the nature to arise (samudaya dhamma) also has the nature to pass away (nirodha dhamma)."

=== Application ===
==== Conditionality as the middle way – not-self and emptiness ====
The early Buddhist texts associate dependent arising with emptiness and not-self and present it as a middle way between different sets of "extreme" views (such as "monist" and "pluralist" ontologies or materialist and dualist views of mind-body relation). (Note: The early Buddhist texts also list other sets of extreme views that are avoided through insight into the middle teaching of dependent arising: The view that "the life-principle (jiva) is the same as the mortal body (sarira)" and the view that holds that "the life-principle is different from the mortal body" (in SN 12.35-36, SA 297, and SA 293). According to dependent origination, the mind and the body are seen as mutually supporting and deeply interconnected processes.; Feeling (vedana) is not created by oneself, by another, created by both, or arises without a cause. It is also not non-existent (natthi). Furthermore, the view that the one who acts is the same as the who experiences the karmic result of the action is one extreme, and the view which says that the one who acts and the one who experiences the results are different is another extreme. These ideas are found in SN 12.17-18, SA 302-303, SN 12.46 and SA 300.; The view that "all is a unity" (or "all is one") and the view that "all is a plurality" (or "everything is separate") are two extremes found in SN.II.77. The first of these ideas is related to the idealistic monism seen in the Upanishads while the second view sees reality as totally separate and independent entities. Dependent origination is instead a network of interconnected processes which are neither the same thing nor totally different.) In the Kaccānagottasutta (SN 12.15, parallel at SA 301), the Buddha states that "this world mostly relies on the dual notions of existence and non-existence" and then explains the right view as follows:

But when you truly see the origin of the world with right understanding, you won't have the notion of non-existence regarding the world. And when you truly see the cessation of the world with right understanding, you won't have the notion of existence regarding the world.

The Kaccānagottasutta then places the teaching of dependent origination (listing the twelve nidanas in forward and reverse order) as a middle way which rejects these two "extreme" metaphysical views which can be seen as two mistaken conceptions of the self. (Note: According to Harvey, what this means is that this teaching avoids the extreme of substantialism "seeing the experienced world as existing here and now in a solid, essential way" as well as believing there are fixed essences (especially an eternal self or soul); as well as avoiding annihilationism and nihilism, that is seeing the world as non-existent or holding that one is annihilated at death. As Harvey writes, dependent origination avoids these two views, instead holding that "no unchanging "being" passes over from one life to another, but the death of a being leads to the continuation of the life process in another context, like the lighting of one lamp from another (Miln. 71).")

According to Hùifēng, a recurring theme throughout the Nidānasamyutta (SN 12) is the Buddha's "rejection of arising from any one or other of the four categories of self, other, both or neither (non-causality)." A related statement can be found in the Paramārthaśūnyatāsūtra (Dharma Discourse on Ultimate Emptiness, SĀ 335, parallel at EĀ 37:7), which states that when a sense organ arises "it does not come from any location...it does not go to any location", as such it is said to be "unreal, yet arises; and on having arisen, it ends and ceases." Furthermore, this sutra states that even though "there is action (karma) and result (vipāka)" there is "no actor agent" (kāraka). It also states that dharmas of dependent origination are classified as conventional.

The Kaccānagottasutta and its parallel also associates understanding dependent origination with avoiding views of a self (atman). This text states that if "you don't get attracted, grasp, and commit to the notion 'my self', you'll have no doubt or uncertainty that what arises is just suffering arising, and what ceases is just suffering ceasing." Similarly, the Mahānidānasutta (DN 15) associates understanding dependent origination with abandoning various wrong views about a self, while failing to understand it is associated becoming entangled in these views. Another sutra, SĀ 297, states that dependent origination is "the Dharma Discourse on Great Emptiness", and then proceeds to refute numerous forms of "self-view" (ātmadṛṣṭi).

SN 12:12 (parallel at SĀ 372) the Buddha is asked a series of questions about the self (who feels? who craves? etc.), the Buddha states that these questions are invalid, and instead teaches dependent origination. SĀ 80 also discusses an important meditative attainment called the emptiness concentration (śūnyatāsamādhi) which in this text is associated contemplating how phenomena arise due to conditions and are subject to cessation.

==== The four noble truths ====
According to early suttas like AN 3.61, the second and third noble truths of the four noble truths are directly correlated to the principle of dependent origination. The second truth applies dependent origination in a direct order, while the third truth applies it in inverse order. Furthermore, according to SN 12.28, the noble eight-fold path (the fourth noble truth) is the path which leads to the cessation of the twelve links of dependent origination and as such is the "best of all conditioned states" (AN.II.34). Therefore, according to Harvey, the four noble truths "can be seen as an application of the principle of conditioned co-arising focused particularly on dukkha."

==== Lists of nidanas ====
In the early Buddhist texts, dependent origination is analyzed and expressed in various lists of dependently originated phenomena (dhammas) or causes (nidānas). Nidānas are co-dependent principles, processes or events, which act as links on a chain, conditioning and depending on each other. When certain conditions are present, they give rise to subsequent conditions, which in turn give rise to other conditions. Phenomena are sustained only so long as their sustaining factors remain.

The most common one is a list of twelve causes (Pali: dvādasanidānāni, Sanskrit: dvādaśanidānāni). Bucknell refers to it as the "standard list". It is found in section 12 of the Samyutta Nikaya and its parallels, as well as in other suttas belonging to other Nikayas and Agamas. This list also appears in Mahasamghika texts like the Salistamba Sutra and in (later) works like Abhidharma texts and Mahayana sutras. According to Eviatar Shulman, "the 12 links are paticcasamuppada," which is a process of mental conditioning. Cox notes that even though the early scriptures contain numerous variations of lists, the 12 factor list became the standard list in the later Abhidharma and Mahayana treatises.

The most common interpretation of the twelve cause list in the traditional exegetical literature is that the list is describing the conditional arising of rebirth in saṃsāra, and the resultant duḥkha (suffering, pain, unsatisfactoriness). (Note: Most Suttas follow the order from ignorance to dukkha. But SN 12.20 views this as a teaching of the requisite conditions for sustaining dukkha, which is its main application.) An alternative Theravada interpretation regards the list as describing the arising of mental formations and the resultant notion of "I" and "mine," which are the source of suffering.

Understanding the relationships between these phenomena is said to lead to nibbana, complete freedom from the cyclical rebirth cycles of samsara. Traditionally, the reversal of the causal chain is explained as leading to the cessation of mental formations and rebirth. Alex Wayman notes that "according to Buddhist tradition, Gautama discovered this formula during the night of Enlightenment and by working backward from "old age and death" in the reverse of the arising order." Wayman also writes that "in time, the twelve members were depicted on the rim of a wheel representing samsara."

== Lists of nidanas ==
=== The twelve nidanas ===
The popular listing of twelve nidānas is found in numerous sources. In some of the early texts, the nidānas themselves are defined and subjected to analysis (vibhaṅga). The explanations of the nidānas can be found in the Pali SN 12.2 (Vibhaṅga "Analysis" sutta) and in its parallel at SA 298. Further parallels to SN 12.2 can be found at EA 49.5, some Sanskrit parallels such as the Pratītyasamutpādādivibhaṅganirdeśanāmasūtra (The Discourse giving the Explanation and Analysis of Conditional Origination from the Beginning) and a Tibetan translation of this Sanskrit text at Toh 211.

Nidana term: Pali (Sanskrit)	Chinese character used in SA	Translations	Analysis (vibhaṅga) found in the early sources
Avijjā (Avidyā, अविद्या)	無明	Ignorance, nescience, blindness	SN 12.2: "Not knowing suffering, not knowing the origination of suffering, not knowing the cessation of suffering, not knowing the way of practice leading to the cessation of suffering: This is called ignorance. It leads to action, or constructing activities." Parallel sources like SA 298 and the Sanskrit Vibhaṅganirdeśa also add lack of knowledge regarding numerous other topics, including karma and its results, the three jewels, moral goodness, "the internal and the external", purity and impurity, arising by causal conditions, etc.
Saṅkhāra (Saṃskāra, संस्कार)	行	Volitional formations, Fabrications, constructions, choices, interaction	SN 12.2: "These three are fabrications: bodily fabrications, verbal fabrications, mental fabrications. These are called fabrications." (Note: Harvey: any action, whether meritorious or harmful, and whether of body, speech or mind, creates karmic imprint on a being. This includes will (cetana) and planning. It leads to transmigratory consciousness.) SA 298 contains the same three types.
Viññāṇa (Vijñāna, विज्ञान)	識	Consciousness, discernment, sense consciousness, life-force, animation	SN 12.2 and SA 298 both agree that there are six types of consciousness: eye-consciousness, ear-consciousness, nose-consciousness, tongue-consciousness, body-consciousness, intellect (or mind) consciousness. (Note: Bucknell: In the Maha-nidana Sutta, which contains ten links, vijnana and nama-rupa are described as conditioning each other, creating a loop which is absent in the standard version of twelve links.)
Nāmarūpa (नामरूप)	名 色	Name and Form, mentality and corporeality, body and mind, named form, conception	SN 12.2: "Feeling, (Note: Here it refers to the function of the mind that cognizes feeling.) perception, (Note: This is the faculty of the mind that names (recognizes) a feeling as pleasurable, unpleasurable or neutral, depending on what was its original tendency.) intention, (Note: This is the faculty of the mind where volitions arise. Volition is noted again in the same sequence as a cause of consciousness.) contact, and attention: (Note: This is the faculty of the mind that can penetrate something, analyze, and objectively observe.) This is called name. (Note: i.e. mentality or mind.) The four great elements, (Note: The earth (property of solidity), water (property of liquity), wind (property of motion, energy and gaseousness), fire (property of heat and cold). See also Mahabhuta. In other places in the Pali Canon (DN 33, MN 140 and SN 27.9) we also see two additional elements - the space property and the consciousness property. Space refers to the idea of space that is occupied by any of the other four elements. For example any physical object occupies space and even though that space is not a property of that object itself, the amount of space it occupies is a property of that object and is therefore a derived property of the elements.) and the body dependent on the four great elements: This is called form." SA 298 and the Sanskrit Vibhaṅganirdeśa define nama differently as the other four skandhas (feeling, perception, saṃskāra, consciousness). (Note: Bucknell: originally, nama-rupa referred to the six classes of sense-objects, which together with the six-senses and the six sense-consciousnesses form phassa, "contact".)
Saḷāyatana (ṣaḍāyatana, षडायतन)	六 入 處	Six sense bases, sense sources, sense media, sentience	SN 12.2 and SA 298 both agree that this refers to the sense bases of the eye, ear, nose, tongue, body, and mind (intellect).
Phassa (Sparśa, स्पर्श)	觸	Contact, sense impression, "touching", perception	SN 12.2 and SA 298 agree that the coming together of the object, the sense medium and the consciousness of that sense medium (Note: Eye-consciousness, ear-consciousness, nose-consciousness, tongue-consciousness, skin-consciousness and mind-consciousness) is called contact. As such there are six corresponding forms of contact. (Note: Mahasi Sayadaw: "...To give another example, it is just like the case of a person in a room who sees many things when he opens the window and looks through it. If it is asked, 'Who is it that sees? Is it the window or the person that actually sees?' the answer is, 'The window does not possess the ability to see; it is only the person who sees.' If it is again asked, 'Will the person be able to see things on the outside without the window (if he is confined to a room without the window or with the window closed)?' the answer will be, 'It is not possible to see things through the wall without the window. One can only see through the window.' Similarly, in the case of seeing, there are two separate realities of the eye and seeing. (So the eye does not have the ability to see without the eye-consciousness. The eye-consciousness itself cannot see anything without the organ.) The eye is not seeing, nor is seeing the eye, yet there cannot be an act of seeing without the eye. In reality, seeing comes into being depending on the eye. It is now evident that in the body there are only two distinct elements of materiality (eye) and mentality (eye-consciousness) at every moment of seeing. There is also a third element of materiality — the visual object. Without the visual object there is nothing to be seen...")
Vedanā (वेदना)	受	Feeling, sensation, hedonic tone	SN 12.2 defines Vedanā as six-fold: vision, hearing, olfactory sensation, gustatory sensation, tactile sensation, and intellectual sensation (thought). Vedanā is also explained as pleasant, unpleasant and/or neutral feelings that occur when our internal sense organs come into contact with external sense objects and the associated consciousness (in SA 298, in the Vibhaṅganirdeśa and in other Pali suttas). These two definitions for feeling are agreed upon by the Pali and Chinese sources.
Taṇhā (tṛṣṇā, तृष्णा)	愛	Craving, desire, greed, "thirst"	SN 12.2: "These six are classes of craving: craving for forms, craving for sounds, craving for smells, craving for tastes, craving for tactile sensations, craving for ideas. This is called craving." These six classes of craving also appear in SA 276. SA 298 and the Vibhaṅganirdeśa contain three different types of craving: craving for sensuality, craving for form, craving for formlessness. These three do not appear in the SN, but they do appear in DN 3. Elsewhere in the SN, three other types of craving appear: craving for sensuality (kama), craving for existence (bhava), craving for non-existence (vibhava). These do not appear in the Chinese SA, but can be found in EA 49.
Upādāna उपादान	取	Clinging, grasping, sustenance, attachment, fuel	SN 12.2 states that there are four main types: clinging to sensuality (kama), (Note: Enjoyment and clinging for music, beauty, sexuality, health, etc.) clinging to views (ditthi), (Note: Clinging for notions and beliefs such as in God, or other cosmological beliefs, political views, economic views, one's own superiority, either due to caste, sex, race, etc., views regarding how things should be, views on being a perfectionist, disciplinarian, libertarian etc.) clinging to ethics and vows (silabbata, "precept and practice"), (Note: Clinging for rituals, dressing, rules of cleansing the body etc.) and clinging to a self-view (attavada)." SA 298 agrees with the first three, but has "clinging to self" for the fourth, instead of clinging to a "self-view". (Note: That there is a self consisting of form and is finite, or a self consisting of form but infinite, or a self that is formless but finite, or a self that is formless and infinite.)
Bhava	有	Existence, Becoming, continuation (Note: Bhikkhu Bodhi: "Bhava, in the MLDB, was translated "being". In seeking an alternative, I had first experimented with "becoming", but when the shortcomings in this choice were pointed out to me I decided to return to "existence", used in my earlier translations. Bhava, however, is not "existence" in the sense of the most universal ontological category, that which is shared by everything from the dishes in the kitchen sink to the numbers in a mathematical equation. Existence in the latter sense is covered by the verb atthi and the abstract noun atthitā. Bhava is concrete sentient existence in one of the three realms of existence posited by Buddhist cosmology, a span of life beginning with conception and ending in death. In the formula of dependent origination it is understood to mean both (i) the active side of life that produces rebirth into a particular mode of sentient existence, in other words rebirth-producing kamma; and (ii) the mode of sentient existence that results from such activity."), grow	SN 12.2: "These three are becoming: sensual becoming, (Note: getting attracted, mesmerized, disgusted) form becoming, (Note: growing older, tall, healthy, weak, becoming a parent or spouse, rich, etc.) formless becoming." (Note: annihilation, destruction, suicide, loss of a position etc.) SA 298 agrees completely with SN 12.2. A Glossary of Pali and Buddhist Terms: "Becoming. States of being that develop first in the mind and can then be experienced as internal worlds and/or as worlds on an external level." There are various interpretations of what this term means. (Note: Thanissaro Bhikkhu :"Nowhere in the suttas does he [the Buddha] define the term becoming, but a survey of how he uses the term in different contexts suggests that it means a sense of identity in a particular world of experience: your sense of what you are, focused on a particular desire, in your personal sense of the world as related to that desire.") (Note: Bhikkhu Bodhi: "(i) the active side of life that produces rebirth into a particular mode of sentient existence, in other words rebirth-producing kamma; and (ii) the mode of sentient existence that results from such activity.") (Note: * Payutto: "[T]he entire process of behavior generated to serve craving and clinging (kammabhava).)
Jāti	生	Birth, rebirth	SN 12.2: "Whatever birth, taking birth, descent, coming-to-be, coming-forth, appearance of aggregates, & acquisition of [sense] media of the various beings in this or that group of beings, that is called birth." SA 298 agrees with SN 12.2 and adds two more items: acquiring dhatus, and acquiring the life-faculty. This is interpreted in many different ways by different sources and authors. (Note: Analayo: "birth" may refer to (physical) birth; to rebirth; (Since without birth no aging, death, or any of the sorrows and disappointments of life would occur, birth is a requisite cause for dukkha. Thus, the complete cessation of dukkha must imply that there is no further birth for the enlightened) and to the arising of mental phenomena.) (Note: The Vibhanga, the second book of the Theravada Abbidhamma, treats both rebirth and the arising of mental phenomena. In the Suttantabhajaniya it is described as rebirth, which is conditioned by becoming (bhava), and gives rise to old age and death (jarāmaraṇa) in a living being. In the Abhidhammabhajaniya it is treated as the arising of mental phenomena.) (Note: Nanavira Thera: "...jati is 'birth' and not 'rebirth'. 'Rebirth' is punabbhava bhinibbatti'.")
Jarāmaraṇa	老 死	Aging or decay, and death	SN 12.2: "Whatever aging, decrepitude, brokenness, graying, wrinkling, decline of life-force, weakening of the faculties of the various beings in this or that group of beings, that is called aging. Whatever deceasing, passing away, breaking up, disappearance, dying, death, completion of time, break up of the aggregates, casting off of the body, interruption in the life faculty of the various beings in this or that group of beings, that is called death." SA 298 generally agrees, adding a few more similar descriptions.

=== Alternative lists in SN/SA ===
The twelve branched list, though popular, is just one of the many lists of dependently originated dharmas which appear in the early sources. According to Analayo, the alternative lists of dependently arisen phenomena are equally valid "alternative expressions of the same principle".

Choong notes that some discourses (SN 12.38-40 and SA 359-361) contain only 11 elements, omitting ignorance and starting out from willing (ceteti). SN 12.39 begins with three synonyms for saṅkhāra, willing, intending (pakappeti) and carrying out (anuseti). It then states that "this becomes an object (arammanam) for the persistence of consciousness (viññanassa-thitiya)" which leads to the appearance of name and form. The standard listing then follows.

SN 12.38 (and the parallel at SA 359) contain a much shorter sequence, it begins with willing as above which leads to consciousness, then following after consciousness it states: "there is in the future the becoming of rebirth (punabbhavabhinibbatti)", which leads to "coming-and-going (agatigati)", followed by "decease-and-rebirth (cutupapato)" and following that "there arise in the future birth, ageing-and-death, grief, lamentation, pain, distress, and despair." Another short sequence is found at SN 12. 66 and SA 291 which contain an analysis of dependent origination with just three factors: craving (tanha), basis (upadhi, possibly related to upadana), and suffering (dukkha).

In SN 12.59 and its counterpart SA 284, there is a chain that starts by saying that for someone who "abides in seeing [the Chinese has grasping at] the flavour in enfettering dharmas (saññojaniyesu dhammesu), there comes the appearance (avakkanti) of consciousness." There then follows the standard list. Then it states that if someone abides by seeing the danger (adinavanupassino) in the dharmas (the Chinese has seeing impermanence), there is no appearance of consciousness (Chinese has mind).

SN 12.65 and 67 (and SA 287 and 288) begin the chain with both consciousness and name and form conditioning each other in a cyclical relationship. It also states that "consciousness turns back, it goes no further than name and form." SN 12.67 also contains a chain with consciousness and name and form being in a reciprocal relationship. In this sutta, Sariputta states that this relationship is like two sheaves of reeds leaning on each other for support (the parallel at SA 288 has three sheaves instead).

There are also several passages with chains that begin with the six sense spheres (ayatana). They can be found in SN 12. 24, SA 343, SA 352-354, SN 12. 13-14 and SN 12. 71-81. Another one of these is found in SN 35.106, which is termed the "branched version" by Bucknell because it branches off into six classes of consciousness:

Eye consciousness arises dependent on the eye and sights. The meeting of the three is contact. Contact is a condition for feeling. Feeling is a condition for craving. This is the origin of suffering … [the same formula is repeated with the other six sense bases and six consciousnesses, that is, ear, nose, tongue, body, and mind]

Other depictions of the chain at SN 12.52 and its parallel at SA 286, begin with seeing the assada (taste; enjoyment; satisfaction) which leads to craving and the rest of the list of nidanas. Meanwhile, in SN 12.62 and SA 290, dependent origination is depicted with just two nidanas, contact (phassa) and feeling (vedana). SN 12.62 says that when one becomes disenchanted with contact and feeling, desire fades away.

=== Alternative lists in other Nikayas ===
The Kalahavivāda Sutta of the Sutta Nipāta (Sn. 862-872) has the following chain of causes (as summarized by Doug Smith):

name-and-form conditions contact, contact conditions feeling, feeling conditions desire, desire conditions clinging, and clinging conditions quarrels, disputes, lamentations, and grief.

Dīgha Nikāya Sutta 1, the Brahmajala Sutta, verse 3.71 describes six nidānas:

They experience these feelings by repeated contact through the six sense-bases; feeling conditions craving; craving conditions clinging; clinging conditions becoming; becoming conditions birth; birth conditions aging and death, sorrow, lamentation, sadness and distress. (Note: Brahmajala Sutta, verse 3.71. This is identified as the first reference in the Canon in footnote 88 for Sutta 1, verse 3.71's footnotes.)

Similarly, the Madhupiṇḍikasutta (MN 18) also contains the following passage:

Eye consciousness arises dependent on the eye and sights. The meeting of the three is contact. Contact is a condition for feeling. What you feel, you perceive. What you perceive, you think about. What you think about, you proliferate (papañca). What you proliferate about is the source from which a person is beset by concepts of identity that emerge from the proliferation of perceptions. This occurs with respect to sights known by the eye in the past, future, and present. [The same process is then repeated with the other six sense bases.]

The Mahānidānasutta (DN 15) and its Chinese parallels such as DA 13 describe a unique version which is dubbed the "looped version" by Bucknell (DN 14 also has a similar looped chain but it adds the six sense fields after name and form):

Name and form are conditions for consciousness. Consciousness is a condition for name and form. Name and form are conditions for contact. Contact is a condition for feeling. Feeling is a condition for craving. Craving is a condition for grasping. Grasping is a condition for continued existence. Continued existence is a condition for rebirth. Rebirth is a condition for old age and death, sorrow, lamentation, pain, sadness, and distress to come to be. That is how this entire mass of suffering originates.

The Mahahatthipadopama-sutta (M 28) contains another short explanation of dependent origination:

these five grasping aggregates are indeed dependently originated. The desire, adherence, attraction, and attachment for these five grasping aggregates is the origin of suffering. Giving up and getting rid of desire and greed for these five grasping aggregates is the cessation of suffering.

=== Correlation with the five aggregates ===
Mathieu Boisvert correlates the middle nidanas (3-10) with the five aggregates. According to Boisvert, the consciousness and feeling aggregates correlate directly with the corresponding nidana, while the rupa aggregate correlates with the six sense objects and contact. The samskara aggregate meanwhile, correlates with nidana #2, as well as craving, clinging and bhava (existence, becoming).

Boisvert notes that while sañña ("perception" or "recognition") is not explicitly found in the twelvefold chain, it would fit in between feeling and craving. This is because unwholesome perceptions (such as delighting in pleasurable feelings) are responsible for the arising of unwholesome samskaras (like craving). Likewise, skillful perceptions (such as focusing on the three marks of existence) lead to wholesome samskaras.

According to Analayo, each of the twelve nidanas "re-quires all five aggregates to be in existence concurrently." Furthermore:

The teaching on dependent arising does not posit the existence of any of the links in the abstract, but instead show how a particular link, as an aspect of the continuity of the five aggregates, has a conditioning influence on another link. It does not imply that any of these links exist apart from the five aggregates.

== Development of the twelve nidanas ==
=== Commentary on Vedic cosmogeny ===
Wayman
Brhadaranyaka	Pratityasamutpada
"by death indeed was this covered"	nescience (avidya)
"or by hunger, for hunger is death"	motivation (samskara)
He created the mind, thinking, 'Let me have a Self'"	perception (vijnana)
"Then he moved about, worshipping. From him, thus worshipping, water was produced"	name-and-form (nama-rupa) (=vijnana in the womb)

Alex Wayman has argued that the ideas found in the dependent origination doctrine may precede the birth of the Buddha, noting that the first four causal links starting with avidya in the Twelve Nidānas are found in the cosmic development theory of the Brihadaranyaka Upanishad and other older Vedic texts.

According to Kalupahana, the concept of causality and causal efficacy where a cause "produces an effect because a property or svadha (energy) is inherent in something" along with alternative ideas of causality, appear extensively in the Vedic literature of the 2nd millennium BCE, such as the 10th mandala of the Rigveda and the Brahmanas layer of the Vedas. (Note: The pre-Buddhist Vedic era theories on causality mention four types of causality, all of which Buddhism rejected. The four Vedic era causality theories in vogue were: sayam katam (attakatam, self causation): this theory posits that there is no external agent (God) necessary for a phenomenon, there is svadha (inner energy) in nature or beings that lead to creative evolution, the cause and the effect are in the essence of the evolute and inseparable (found in the Vedic and particularly Upanishadic proto-Hindu schools); param katam (external causation): posits that something external (God, fate, past karma or purely natural determinism) causes effects (found in materialistic schools like Charvaka, as well as fate-driven schools such as Ajivika); sayam-param katam (internal and external causation): combination of the first two theories of causation (found in some Jainism, theistic proto-Hindu schools); asayam-aparam katam (neither internal nor external causation): this theory denies direct determinism (ahetu) and posits fortuitous origination, asserting everything is a manifestation of a combination of chance (found in some proto-Hindu [clarification needed] schools).)

Jurewicz
Hymn of Creation, RigVeda X, 129	Twelve Nidanas	Skandhas	Commentary
"...at first there was nothing, not even existence or nonexistence."	Avijja (ignorance)	-	
"...a volitional impulse [kama, "desire"] initiates the process of creation or evolution."	Samkhara ("volitions")	Samkhara (4th skandha)	In Buddhism, "[d]esire, the process which keeps us in samsara, is one of the constituents of this skandha."
Kamma is the seed of consciousness.	Vijnana	Vijnana (5th skandha)	* In the Hymn of Creation, consciousness is a "singular consciousness", (Jurewicz) "non-dual consciousness", (Gombrich) "reflexive, cognizing itself". (Gombrich) * In Buddhism, Vijnana is "consciousness of", not consciousness itself.
Pure consciousness manifests itself in the created world, name-and-form, with which it mistakenly identifies, losing sight of its real identity.	Nama-Rupa, "name-and-form"	-	* According to Jurewicz, the Buddha may have picked at this point the term nama-rupa, because "the division of consciousness into name and form has only the negative value of an act which hinders cognition." The first four links, in this way, describe "a chain of events which drive a human being into deeper and deeper ignorance about himself." * According to Gombrich, the Buddhist tradition soon lost sight of this connection with the Vedic worldview, equating nama-rupa with the five skandhas, denying a self (atman) separate from these skandhas.

A similar resemblance has been noted by Joanna Jurewicz, who argues that the first four nidanas resemble the Hymn of Creation (RigVeda X, 12) and other Vedic sources which describe the creation of the cosmos. Jurewicz argues that dependent origination is "a polemic" against the Vedic creation myth and that, paradoxically, "the Buddha extracted the essence of Vedic cosmogony and expressed in explicit language." Richard Gombrich agrees with this view, and argues that the first four elements of dependent origination are the Buddha's attempt to "ironize and criticize Vedic cosmogony." According to Gombrich, while in the Vedic creation theory "the universe is considered to be grounded on a primordial essence which is endowed with consciousness," the Buddha's theory avoids this essence (atman-Bahman).

Jurewicz and Gombrich compare the first nidana, ignorance (avijja), with the stage before creation that is described in the Rigveda's Hymn of Creation. While the term avidya does not actually appear in this Hymn, the pre-creation stage is seen as unknowable and characterized by darkness. According to Gombrich, at this stage "consciousness is non-dual, which is to say that it is the ability to cognize but not yet consciousness of anything, for there is no split yet into subject and object." This is different from the Buddha's point of view, in which consciousness is always consciousness of something. Jurewicz then compares the Vedic creator's desire and hunger to create the atman (or "his second self") with volitional impulses (samskara). According to Jurewicz, the third nidana, vijñana, can be compared to the atman's vijñanamaya kosha in Vedic literature, which is the consciousness of the creator and his subjective manifestations.

According to Jurewicz, "in Vedic cosmogony, the act of giving a name and a form marks the final formation of the creator's atman." This may go back to the Vedic birth ceremony in which a father gives a name to his son. In Vedic creation pure consciousness creates the world as name and form (nama-rupa) and then enters it. However, in this process, consciousness also hides from itself, losing sight of its real identity. The Buddhist view of consciousness entering name and form depicts a similar chain of events leading to deeper ignorance and entanglement with the world.

Jurewizc further argues that the rest of the twelve nidanas show similarities with the terms and ideas found in Vedic cosmogeny, especially as it relates to the sacrificial fire (as a metaphor for desire and existence). These Vedic terms may have been adopted by the Buddha to communicate his message of not-self because his audience (often educated in Vedic thought) would understand their basic meaning. According to Jurewizc, dependent origination replicates the general Vedic creation model, but negates its metaphysics and its morals. Furthermore, Jurewizc argues that:

This deprives the Vedic cosmogony of its positive meaning as the successful activity of the Absolute and presents it as a chain of absurd, meaningless changes which could only result in the repeated death of anyone who would reproduce this cosmogonic process in ritual activity and everyday life.

According to Gombrich, the Buddhist tradition soon lost sight of their connection with the Vedic worldview that the Buddha was critiquing in the first four links of dependent origination. Though it was aware that at the fourth link there should be an appearance of an individual person, the Buddhist tradition equated rupa with the first skandha, and nama with the other four skandhas. Yet, as Gombrich notes, samkhara, vijnana, and vedana also appear as separate links in the twelvefold list, so this equation can't be correct for this nidana.

=== Synthesis of older lists ===
==== Early synthesis by the Buddha ====
According to Erich Frauwallner, the twelvefold chain resulted from the Buddha's combination of two lists. Originally, the Buddha explained the appearance of dukkha from tanha, "thirst", craving. Later on, the Buddha incorporated avijja, "ignorance", as a cause of suffering into his system. This is described in the first part of dependent origination. Frauwallner saw this "purely mechanical mixing" as "enigmatical", "contradictory" and a "deficiency in systematization".

Paul Williams discusses Frauwallner's idea that the 12 links may be a composite. However, he ultimately concludes that "it may be impossible at our present stage of scholarship to work out very satisfactorily what the original logic of the full twelvefold formula was intended to be, if there ever was one intention at all."

==== As a later synthesis by monks ====
Hajime Nakamura has argued that we should search the Sutta Nipata for the earliest form of dependent origination since it is the most ancient source. According to Nakamura, "the main framework of later theories of Dependent Origination" can be reconstructed from the Sutta Nipata as follows: avidya, tanha, upadana, bhava, jaramarana. Lambert Schmitthausen has also argued that the twelve-fold list is a synthesis from three previous lists, arguing that the three lifetimes-interpretation is an unintended consequence of this synthesis. (Note: Shulman refers to Schmitthausen (2000), Zur Zwolfgliedrigen Formel des Entstehens in Abhangigkeit, in Horin: Vergleichende Studien zur Japanischen Kultur, 7)

Boisvert
Skandha	Nidana
Vijnana ("mere consciousness") (Note: Boisvert correlates vijnana in the twelve nidanas sequence; in the five skandhas, vijnana comes last.)	Vijnana (consciousness)
Rupa (matter, form)	Saḷāyatana (six sense-bases) + phassa (contact) (includes sense-objects + mental organ (mano))
Vedana (feeling)	Vedana (feeling)
Sanna (perception)	Sanna prevents the arising of ↓
Samkharas (mental formations)	Tanha ("thirst", craving)
Samkharas (mental formations)	Upadana (clinging)
Samkharas (mental formations)	Bhava (becoming)

According to Mathieu Boisvert, nidana 3-10 correlate with the five skandhas. Boisvert notes that while sañña, "perception", is not found in the twelvefold chain, it does play a role in the processes described by the chain, particularly between feeling and the arising of samskaras. Likewise, Waldron notes that the anusaya, "underlying tendencies, are the link between the cognitive processes of phassa ("contact") and vedana (feeling), and the afflictive responses of tanha ("craving") and upadana ("grasping").

Schumann
The 12-fold chain	the 5 skhandhas
First existence
	1. Body
	2. Sensation
	3. Perception
1. Ignorance	
2. Formations	4. Formations
3. Consciousness	5. Consciousness
Second existence
4. Nama-rupa	1. Body
5. The six senses	
6. Touch	
7. Sensation	2. Sensation
	3. Perception
	4. Formations
	5. Consciousness
8. Craving	
9. Clinging	
Third existence
10. Becoming	
	1. Body
11. Birth	
	2. Sensation
	3. Perception
	4. Formations
	5. Consciousness
12. Old age and death	

Hans Wolfgang Schumann argues that a comparison of the twelve nidanas with the five skhandhas shows that the 12 link chain contains logical inconsistencies, which can be explained when the chain is considered to be a later elaboration. Schumann thus concluded that the twelvefold chain was a later synthesis composed by Buddhist monks, consisting of three shorter lists. These lists may have encompassed nidana 1–4, 5–8, and 8-12. Schumann also proposes that the 12 nidanas are extended over three existences, and illustrates the succession of rebirths. While Buddhaghosa and Vasubandhu maintain a 2-8-2 schema, Schumann maintains a 3-6-3 scheme.

According to Richard Gombrich, the twelve-fold list is a combination of two previous lists, the second list beginning with tanha, "thirst", the cause of suffering as described in the second noble truth". The first list consists of the first four nidanas, which reference Vedic cosmogony, as described by Jurewicz. (Note: Jurewicz (2000), Playing with fire: the pratityasamutpada from the perspective of Vedic thought. Journal of the Pali Text Society, XXVI, 77-104.) According to Gombrich, the two lists were combined, resulting in contradictions in its reverse version. (Note: Gombrich: "The six senses, and thence, via 'contact' and 'feeling', to thirst." It is quite plausible, however, that someone failed to notice that once the first four links became part of the chain, its negative version meant that in order to abolish ignorance one first had to abolish consciousness!")

==== Bucknell's thesis ====
Ancestor version
		salayana (sixfold sense-base) + nama-rupa (name-and-form) ↓	= phassa (contact) ↓
avijja → (ignorance)	sankhara → (volitional action)	vijnana (consciousness)	= phassa (contact) ↓
			vedana (feeling) ↓
etc.

Roderick S. Bucknell analysed four versions of the twelve nidanas, to explain the existence of various versions of the pratitya-samutpada sequence. The twelvefold version is the "standard version", in which vijnana refers to sensual consciousness. (Note: Bucknell: "vinnana: consciousness associated with eye, ear, nose tongue, body, and mind (mano)") According to Bucknell, the "standard version" of the twelve nidanas developed out of an ancestor version, which in turn was derived two different versions that understand consciousness (vijñana) and name and form (namarupa) differently.

Branched version
salayana (sixfold sense-base) + nama-rupa (six sense-objects) ↓ vijnana (consciousness)	= phassa (contact) ↓
	vedana (feeling) ↓
	etc.

According to Bucknell, SN 35.106 describes a non-linear "branched version" of dependent origination in which consciousness is derived from the coming together of the sense organs and the sense objects (and thus represents sense perception). The Mahānidānasutta (DN 15) describes a "looped version", in which consciousness and nama-rupa condition each other. It also describes consciousness descending into the womb. According to Bucknell, "some accounts of the looped version state explicitly that the chain of causation goes no further back than the loop.

Waldron also mentions idea that in early Buddhism, consciousness may have been understood as having these two different aspects (basic consciousness or sentience and cognitive sense consciousness). While these two aspects were largely undifferentiated in early Buddhist thought, these two aspects and their relation was explicated in later Buddhist thought, giving rise to the concept of alaya-vijñana.

In yet another linear version, dubbed the "Sutta-nipata version", consciousness is derived from avijja ("ignorance") and saṅkhāra ("activities" also translated as "volitional formations").

Looped version
vijnana (consciousness)
↑↓
nama-rupa (name-and-form)
[salayana (sixfold sense-base)]
phassa (contact)
vedana (feeling)
etc.

According to Bucknell, while the "branched version" refers directly to the six sense objects, the "looped version" and the standard version instead use the term nama-rupa as "a collective term for the six types of sense object." He cites various passages from the early sources and the scholarship of Yinshun, Reat and Watsuji in support. Bucknell thinks that name and form was eventually misinterpreted as referring to "mind and body", causing discrepancies in the 12 fold series and making it possible to interpret the beginning of the chain as referring to rebirth. (Note: Bucknell: "These observations by Watsuji, Yinshun, and Reat indicate that nama-rupa, far from signifying "mind-and-body" or something similar, is a collective term for the six types of sense object.") According to Bucknell, the linear list, with its distortions and changed meaning for consciousness and name and form, may have developed when the list came to be recited in reverse order. Bucknell further notes that the "branched version", corresponds with the interpretation of the twelve nidanas as mental processes while the "looped version", (which sees consciousness as the "rebirth consciousness") corresponds with the "three lives" interpretation.

=== The 12 nidānas as an early list ===
Against the view that the 12 link chain is later, Alex Wayman writes "I am convinced that the full twelve members have been in Buddhism since earliest times, just as it is certain that a natural division into the first seven and last five was also known."

Bhikkhu Bodhi writes that the suggestions of some scholars the twelvefold formula is a later expansion of a shorter list "remain purely conjectural, misleading, and objectionable on doctrinal and textual grounds."

Choong, in his comparative study of SN and SA also writes that the different accounts of dependent origination existed at an early stage and that they are simply different ways of presenting the same teaching which would have been used for different times and with audiences. Choong writes that the various versions of dependent arising "are unlikely to represent a progressive development, with some being earlier and others later" and that "the comparative data revealed here do not provide evidence to support the speculative suggestion that there was just one original (or relatively early) account of the series, from which the other attested accounts developed later."

=== Comparison of lists ===
The following chart compares different lists of nidanas from the early sources with other similar lists:

Comparison of lists
12 Nidanas	Bucknell's "hypothetical reconstruction"	Rigveda's Hymn of Creation	DN 15 Mahanidana sutra	MN 148:28	Tanha-list	Boisvert's mapping to the skandhas	Four Noble Truths
Avijjā	[Ignorance]	Avijjā					
Saṅkhāra	[Activities]	Kamma					
Viññāṇa	Sensual consciousness	Vijnana	Consciousness ↓	Eye-consciousness		Vijnana	Dukkha (Five skandhas)
Nāmarūpa	↑ Sense objects +	Identification of vijnana with the manifest world (name and form)	↑ Name-and-form	↑ Visible objects +		Rupa	Dukkha (Five skandhas)
Saḷāyatana	Six-fold sense bases		-	Eye		Rupa	Dukkha (Five skandhas)
Phassa	Contact		Contact	Contact		Rupa	Dukkha (Five skandhas)
Vedanā	Feeling (sensation)		Feeling	Feeling		Vedana	Dukkha (Five skandhas)
-	-		-	Anusaya (underlying tendencies)	-	Sanna (perception) prevents arising of ↓ (Note: Compare Grzegorz Polak, who argues that the four upassanā, the "four bases of mindfulness", have been misunderstood by the developing Buddhist tradition, including Theravada, to refer to four different foundations. According to Polak, the four upassanā do not refer to four different foundations, but to the awareness of four different aspects of raising sati, mindfulness: the six sense-bases which one needs to be aware of (kāyānupassanā); contemplation on vedanās, which arise with the contact between the senses and their objects (vedanānupassanā); the altered states of mind to which this practice leads (cittānupassanā); the development from the five hindrances to the seven factors of enlightenment (dhammānupassanā).)	Dukkha (Five skandhas)
Taṇhā	Craving		Craving		Craving ("thirst")	Samkharas (see also kleshas)	Dukkha (Five skandhas)
Upādāna	Clinging (attachment)		Clinging		Clinging	Samkharas (see also kleshas)	Dukkha (Five skandhas)
Bhava (kammabhava)	Becoming		Becoming		Becoming	Samkharas (see also kleshas)	Dukkha (Five skandhas)
Jāti	Birth		Birth		Birth		Dukkha (Birth, aging and death)
Jarāmaraṇa	Aging and death		Aging and death		Aging, death, and this entire mass of dukkha		Dukkha (Birth, aging and death)

== Transcendental/reverse dependent origination ==
Understanding dependent origination is indispensable for realizing nirvana since it leads to insight into how the process of dependent arising can be brought to an end (i.e. nirvana). Since the process of dependent origination always produces suffering, the reversal or deactivation of the sequence is seen by Buddhists as the way to stop the entire process. Traditionally, the reversal of the sequence of the twelve nidanas is explained as leading to the cessation of rebirth and suffering. The early Buddhist texts state that on the arising of wisdom or insight into the true nature of things, dependent origination ceases. Some suttas state that "from the fading and cessation of ignorance without remainder comes the cessation of saṅkhāras..." et cetera (this is said to lead to the cessation of the entire twelve-fold chain in reverse order).

According to Jayarava Attwood, while some dependent origination passages (termed lokiya, worldly) "[model] beings trapped in cycles of craving and grasping, birth and death", other passages (termed lokuttara, 'beyond the world') "[model] the process and dynamics of liberation from those same cycles." According to Bodhi, these are also classified as "exposition of the round" (vaṭṭakathā) and "the ending of the round" (vivaṭṭakathā). Beni Barua called these two different kinds of dependent origination "cyclic" and "progressive". Various early Buddhist texts present different sequences of transcendental dependent origination (lokuttara paṭicca-samuppāda) or reverse dependent origination (paṭiloma-paṭiccasamuppāda). (Note: Bhikkhu Bodhi: "In addition to giving a clear, explicit account of the conditional structure of the liberative progression, this sutta has the further advantage of bringing the supramundane form of dependent arising into immediate connection with its familiar samsaric counterpart. By making this connection it brings into prominence the comprehensive character of the principle of conditionality — its ability to support and explain both the process of compulsive involvement which is the origin of suffering and the process of disengagement which leads to deliverance from suffering. Thereby it reveals dependent arising to be the key to the unity and coherence of the Buddha's teaching.) The Upanisā Sutta (and its Chinese parallel at MĀ 55) is the only text in which both types of dependent origination appear side by side and therefore it has become the main source used to teach reverse dependent origination in English language sources. Attwood cites numerous other Pali suttas which contain various lists of dependently originated phenomena that lead to liberation, each one being a "precondition" (upanisā) for the next one in the sequence. (Note: The various listings can be found in: DN 2 (repeated at DN 9, 10, 11, 12, 138, DN 34, MN 7 (repeat at MN 40), MN 51, SN 12.23, SN 35.97, SN 42.13, SN 55.40, AN 5.26, AN 6.10, AN 8.81, AN 10.1 (AN 11.1), AN 10.2 (AN 11.2), AN 10.3 (AN 11.3), AN 10.4 (AN 11.4), AN 10.5 (11.5), and AN 11.12.)

According to Attwood, AN 11.2 (which has a parallel at MA 43) is a better representative of transcendental dependent origination passages and better conforms "to the general outline of the Buddhist path as consisting of ethics, meditation and wisdom." AN 11.2 states that once someone has fulfilled one element of the path, it naturally leads to the next one. Therefore, there is no need to will or wish (Pali: cetanā, intention, volition) for one thing to lead to the other one, since this happens effortlessly. Therefore, the sutta states that "good qualities flow on and fill up from one to the other, for going from the near shore to the far shore." The process begins with the cultivation of ethics, using the following formula which is then applied to each further factor sequentially: "Mendicants, an ethical person, who has fulfilled ethical conduct, need not make a wish: 'May I have no regrets!' It's only natural that an ethical person has no regrets...etc."

=== Comparison of Lists ===
The following chart compares various transcendental dependent arising sequences found in Pali and Chinese sources:

Transcendental Dependent Arising in various sources
SN 12.23	MĀ 55 (Parallel to SN 12.23)	AN 11.1-5 and AN 10.1-5, MĀ 42 and 43	AN 7.65, 8.81, 6.50, 5.24	MĀ 45 (parallel to AN 8.81)	Comments
Suffering (Dukkha)	Suffering (苦, Skt. Duḥkha)	_	_	_	B. Bodhi comments: "Suffering spurs the awakening of the religious consciousness," it shatters "our naive optimism and unquestioned trust in the goodness of the given order of things," and "tears us out of our blind absorption in the immediacy of temporal being and sets us in search of a way to its transcendence."
Faith (saddhā)	Faith (信)	_	_	Faith (信)	Skt. śraddhā. An attitude of trust directed at ultimate liberation and the three jewels. SN 12.23 states that "suffering is the supporting condition for faith", thereby linking it with the last nidana in the 12 nidana chain. Faith also comes about through the hearing of the exposition of true Dhamma (teaching). Faith also leads to the practice of morality (sila).
_	Wise Attention (正思惟)	_	_	Wise Attention (正思惟)	Skt. yoniso-manasikāra
_	Right mindfulness (正念)	_	Mindfulness and Situational Awareness (sati-sampajañña)	Right mindfulness & attentiveness (正念正智)	In MN 10, mindfulness is cultivated by being attentive (upassana) to four domains: the body, feelings (vedana), the mind (citta), and principles/phenomena (dhammas). In MN 10, sampajañña is a "situational awareness" (trans. Sujato) regarding all bodily activities.
_	_	_	Shame and moral concern (hiri and ottapa)	Shame (慚) and moral concern (愧)	Bhikkhu Bodhi: "Hiri, the sense of shame, has an internal reference; it is rooted in self-respect and induces us to shrink from wrongdoing out of a feeling of personal honor. Ottappa, fear of wrongdoing, has an external orientation. It is the voice of conscience that warns us of the dire consequences of moral transgression: blame and punishment by others, the painful kammic results of evil deeds, the impediment to our desire for liberation from suffering."
_	_	_	_	Love and respect (愛恭敬)	The Sanskrit for respect is gaurava
_	Guarding the sense faculties (護諸根)	_	Guarding the sense doors (indriya-saṃvara)	Guarding the senses (護諸根)	MN 38: "When they see a sight with their eyes, they don't get caught up in the features and details. If the faculty of sight were left unrestrained, bad unskillful qualities of desire and aversion would become overwhelming. For this reason, they practice restraint, protecting the faculty of sight, and achieving its restraint." The same passage is repeated for each of the other sense bases (including thoughts in the mind).
_	Ethics (護戒)	Fulfilling ethical conduct (sīla)	Sīla	Ethics (護戒)	The early sources contain various teachings on basic ethical conduct such as the five precepts and the ten courses of wholesome action.
_	Non-regret (不悔)	Clear conscience (avippaṭisāra) AN 10.1 / Lack of regrets (AN 11.1)	_	Non-regret (不悔)	
Joy (pāmojja)	Joy (歡悅, Skt. prāmodhya)	Joy	_	Joy (歡悅)	From confidence in the sources of refuge and contemplation on them, a sense of joy arises
Rapture (pīti)	Rapture (喜, Skt. prīti)	Rapture	_	Rapture (喜)	Generally, the application of meditation is needed for the arising of rapture, though some rare individuals might experience rapture simply from the joy which arises from faith and a clear conscience arising from moral living. The meditative states called jhanas are states of elevated rapture.
Tranquillity (passaddhi)	Calming down (止, Skt. prāśabdha)	Tranquility	_	Calming down (止)	In the higher states of meditation, rapture gives way to a calm sense of tranquility.
Happiness (sukha)	Happiness (樂)	Happiness	_	Happiness (樂)	A subtler state than rapture, a pleasant feeling.
Samādhi	Samādhi (定)	Samādhi	Samādhi (AN 8.81 has sammā "right" samādhi)	Samādhi (定)	Bodhi: "The wholesome unification of the mind", totally free from distractions and unsteadiness.
Knowledge and vision of things as they really are (yathābhūta-ñānadassana)	To see reality, and know things as they are (見如實知如真, Skt. yathābhūta-jñānadarśana)	Knowledge and vision of things as they really are	Knowledge and vision of things as they really are	To see reality, and know things as they are (見如實知如真)	With a peaceful and concentrated mind, insight (vipassana) can be developed, the first phase of which is insight into the nature of the five aggregates. Only pañña, the wisdom which penetrates the true nature of phenomena, can destroy the defilements which keep beings bound to samsara. This wisdom is not mere conceptual understanding, but a kind of direct experience akin to visual perception which sees the impermanence, unsatisfactoriness, and selflessness of all phenomena. In Northern Buddhist traditions and Mahayana works, insight into emptiness is further emphasized.
Disenchantment (nibbidā)	Disenchantment (厭)	Disenchantment	Disenchantment	Disenchantment (厭, Skt. nirveda)	Noticing the passing away of phenomena, the fact that nothing is stable, reliable or permanent, gives rise to a sense of disenchantment towards them. B. Bodhi: "a conscious act of detachment resulting from a profound noetic discovery. Nibbida signifies in short, the serene, dignified withdrawal from phenomena that supervenes when the illusion of their permanence, pleasure, and selfhood has been shattered by the light of correct knowledge and vision of things as they are."
Dispassion (virāga)	Dispassion (無欲)	Dispassion	Dispassion	Dispassion (無欲, Skt. virāga)	The first truly transmundane (lokuttara) stage in the progression. B. Bodhi: "Whatever tends to provoke grasping and adherence is immediately abandoned, whatever tends to create new involvement is left behind. The old urges towards outer extension and accumulation give way to a new urge towards relinquishment as the one clearly perceived way to release."
Liberation (vimutti)	_	Liberation (MĀ 42 ends the sequence here)	Liberation (AN 8.81 skips this stage)	Liberation (解脱, Skt. vimokṣa)	Having a twofold aspect: the emancipation from ignorance (paññavimutti) and defilements (cetovimutti) experienced in life, the other is the emancipation from repeated existence attained when passing away.
Knowledge of destruction of the āsavas – defiled influences (āsava-khaye-ñāna)	Nirvāṇa (涅槃)	Knowledge and vision of liberation (Vimutti-ñānadassana)	Knowledge and vision of liberation	Nirvāṇa (涅槃)	Different sources finish the sequence with different terms indicating spiritual liberation. B. Bodhi (commenting on SN 12.23): "The retrospective cognition of release involves two acts of ascertainment. The first, called the "knowledge of destruction" (khaya ñana), ascertains that all defilements have been abandoned at the root; the second, the "knowledge of non-arising" (anuppade ñana), ascertains that no defilement can ever arise again."

== Interpretations ==
There are numerous interpretations of the doctrine of dependent origination across the different Buddhist traditions and within them as well. Various systematizations of the doctrine were developed by the Abhidharma traditions which arose after the death of the Buddha. Modern scholars have also interpreted the teaching in different ways. According to Ajahn Brahm, a fully correct understanding of dependent origination can only be known by awakened being or ariyas. Brahm notes that "this goes a long way to answering the question why there is so much difference of opinion on the meaning of dependent origination."

Collett Cox writes that the majority of scholarly investigations of dependent origination adopt two main interpretations of dependent origination, they either see it as "a generalized and logical principle of abstract conditioning applicable to all phenomena" or they see it as a "descriptive model for the operation of action (karman) and the process of rebirth." According to Bhikkhu Analayo, there are two main interpretative models of the 12 nidanas in the later Buddhist exegetical literature, a model which sees the 12 links as working across three lives (the past life, the present life, the future life) and a model which analyzes how the 12 links are mental processes working in the present moment. Analayo argues that these are not mutually exclusive, but instead are complementary interpretations.

Alex Wayman has argued that understanding the dependent origination formula requires understanding its two main interpretations. According to Wayman, these two are: (1) the general principle of dependent origination itself, its nidanas and their relationships and (2) how it deals with the particular process of the rebirth of sentient beings.

=== Conditionality ===
The general principle of conditionality is expressed in numerous early sources as "When this is, that is; This arising, that arises; When this is not, that is not; This ceasing, that ceases." According to Rupert Gethin, this basic principle is neither a direct Newtonian-like causality nor a singular form of causality. Rather, it asserts an indirect and plural conditionality which is somewhat different from classic European views on causation. The Buddhist concept of dependence is referring to conditions created by a plurality of causes that necessarily co-originate phenomena within and across lifetimes, such as karma in one life creating conditions that lead to rebirth in a certain realm of existence for another lifetime. (Note: The fifth century Theravada commentator Buddhaghosa states that dependent arising "means that something can only arise when its conditions are gathered together (Vism.521). Something arises together with its conditions.")

Bhikkhu Bodhi writes that the Buddhist principle of conditionality "shows that the "texture" of being is through and through relational." Furthermore, he notes that dependent arising goes further than just presenting a general theory about conditionality, it also teaches a specific conditionality (idappaccayatā), which explains change in terms of specific conditions. Dependent arising therefore also explains the structure of relationships between specific types of phenomena (in various interlocking sequences) which lead to suffering as well as the ending of suffering.

==== Necessary and sufficient conditions ====
Ajahn Brahm has argued that the Buddhist doctrine of conditionality includes two main elements of the logical concepts of conditionality: necessity and sufficiency. According to Brahm, "when this is, that is; from the arising of this, that arises." refers to a "sufficient condition" while "when this is not, that is not; from the ceasing of this, that ceases" refers to a "necessary condition". Like Brahm, Bodhi also argues that there are two main characterizations of conditionality in the early sources. One is positive, indicating "a contributory influence passing from the condition to the dependent state," while the other is negative, indicating "the impossibility of the dependent state appearing in the absence of its condition." He compares these two with the first and second phrases of the general principle definition respectively. Regarding the second, positive characterization, other early sources also state that a condition "originates (samudaya) the dependent state, provides it with a source (nidāna), generates it (jātika), gives it being (pabhava), nourishes it (āhāra), acts as its foundation (upanisā), causes it to surge (upayāpeti)" (see: SN 12.11, 23, 27, 66, 69).

However, according to Harvey and Brahm, while the 12 nidanas are necessary conditions for each other, not all of them are necessary and sufficient conditions (some are, some are not). As Harvey notes, if this was the case, "when a buddha or arahat experienced feeling they would inevitably experience craving" (but they do not). As such, feeling is only one of the conditions for craving (another one is ignorance). Therefore, in this Buddhist view of causality, nothing has a single cause. Bodhi agrees with this, stating that not all conditional relations in dependent arising are based on direct causal necessitation. While in some cases there is a direct necessary relationship between the phenomena outlined in the lists (birth will always lead to death), in other cases there is not. This is an important point because as Bodhi notes, "if dependent arising described a series in which each factor necessitated the next, the series could never be broken," and liberation would be impossible.

==== Abhidharma views of conditionality ====
The Buddhist abhidharma traditions developed a more complex schematization of conditionality than that found in the early sources. These systems outlined different kinds of conditional relationships. According to K.L. Dhammajoti, vaibhāṣika abhidharma developed two major schemes to explain conditional relations: the four conditions (pratyaya) and the six causes (hetu). The vaibhāṣika system also defended a theory of simultaneous causation. While simultaneous causation was rejected by the sautrāntika school, it was later adopted by yogācāra. The Theravāda abhidhamma also developed a complex analysis of conditional relations, which can be found in the Paṭṭhāna. A key element of this system is that nothing arises from a single cause or as a solitary phenomenon, instead there are always a plurality of conditions giving rise to clusters of dhammas (phenomena). The Theravāda abhidhamma outlines twenty four kinds of conditional relations.

==== Conditioned or unconditioned? ====
As a result of their doctrinal development, the various sectarian Buddhist schools eventually became divided over the question of whether or not the very principle of dependent origination was itself conditioned (saṃskṛta) or unconditioned (asaṃskṛta). This debate also included other terms such as "stability of dharma" (dharmasthititā) and "suchness" (tathatā), which were not always seen as synonymous with "dependent origination" by all schools. The Theravāda, vātsīputriya and sarvāstivāda school generally affirmed that dependent origination itself was conditioned. The mahāsāṃghikas and mahīśāsakas accepted the conditioned nature of the "stability of dharma", but both held that dependent origination itself was unconditioned. The Dharmaguptaka's Śāriputrābhidharma also held that dependent origination was unconditioned.

=== Ontological principle ===
==== Relations of being, becoming, existence and ultimate reality ====
According to Bhikkhu Bodhi, Peter Harvey and Paul Williams, dependent arising can be understood as an ontological principle; that is, a theory to explain the nature and relations of being, becoming, existence and ultimate reality. (Theravada) Buddhism asserts that there is nothing independent, except nirvana. (Note: Harvey: "This [doctrine] states the principle of conditionality, that all things, mental and physical, arise and exist due to the presence of certain conditions, and cease once their conditions are removed: nothing (except Nibbana) is independent. The doctrine thus complements the teaching that no permanent, independent self can be found.") (Note: Bodhi: "it [dependent origination] provides the teaching with its primary ontological principle, its key for understanding the nature of being.") This ontology holds that all physical and mental states depend on and arise from other pre-existing states, and in turn from them arise other dependent states while they cease. These 'dependent arisings' are causally conditioned, and thus pratityasamutpada is the Buddhist belief that causality is the basis of ontology. As Williams explains, "all elements of samsara exist in some sense or another relative to their causes and conditions. That is why they are impermanent, for if the cause is impermanent then so too will be the effect."

Gombrich describes dependent origination as the idea that "nothing accessible to our reason or our normal experience exists without a cause". Furthermore, this can be seen as a metaphysical middle way which does not see phenomena as existing essentially nor as not-existing at all. Instead it sees the world as "a world of flux and process", a world of "verbs, not nouns."

According to Rupert Gethin, the ontological principle of dependent origination is applied not only to explain the nature and existence of matter and empirically observed phenomenon, but also to the causally conditioned nature and existence of life. Indeed, according to Williams, the goal of this analysis is to understand how suffering arises for sentient beings through an impersonal law and thus how it can also be brought to an end by reversing its causes. Understood in this way, dependent origination has no place for a creator God nor the ontological Vedic concept called universal Self (Brahman) nor any other 'transcendent creative principle'. In this worldview, there is no 'first cause' from which all beings arose, instead, every thing arises in dependence on something else.

Though Eviatar Shulman sees dependent origination as mainly being concerned with mental processes, he also states that it "possessed important ontological implications" which "suggest that rather than things being conditioned by other things, they are actually conditioned by consciousness." This is implied by the fact that form (rūpa) is said to be conditioned by consciousness and willed activities (saṇkhara) as well as by how grasping is said to condition existence (bhava). For Shulman, "these forms of conditioning undermine the realistic ontology normally attributed to early Buddhism" and furthermore "suggest that the mind has power over objects beyond what we normally believe" as well as implying that "ontology is secondary to experience."

While some scholars have argued that the Buddha put aside all metaphysical questions, Noa Ronkin argues that, while he rejected certain metaphysical questions, he was not an anti-metaphysician: nothing in the texts suggests that metaphysical questions are completely meaningless. Instead, the Buddha taught that sentient experience is dependently originated and that whatever is dependently originated is conditioned, impermanent, subject to change, and lacking independent selfhood.

==== Rebirth ====
===== Analysis of rebirth without a self =====
The view that the application of dependent origination in the twelve nidanas is closely connected with rebirth is supported by passages from the early sources. Both the Sammādiṭṭhisutta and the Mahānidānasutta specifically mention the factors of dependent origination as being related to the process of conception in the womb. Bhikkhu Bodhi affirms the centrality of rebirth for dependent origination. Bodhi writes that "the primary purpose, as seen in the most archaic Buddhist texts, is to show the causal origination of suffering, which is sustained precisely by our bondage to rebirth."

Ajahn Brahm agrees, writing that the main purpose of dependent origination is to explain "how there can be rebirth without a soul" and "why there is suffering, and where suffering comes to an end." Brahm cites the definitions of the nidanas in the Vibhaṅgasutta (SN 12.2) which clearly indicate that birth and death is meant literally. According to Brahm,

Paṭicca-samuppāda shows the empty process, empty of a soul that is, which flows within a life and overflows into another life. It also shows the forces at work in the process, which drive it this way and that, even exercising sway in a subsequent life. Dependent origination also reveals the answer to how kamma done in a previous life can affect a person in this life.

Brahm argues that there are two parallel processes at work in dependent origination (which are really one process looked at from different angles), one is delusion and kamma leading to rebirth consciousness (nidanas # 1 – 3) and the other is craving and clinging leading to existence and rebirth (# 8 – 11). Brahm describes this as follows: "deluded kamma and craving produce the fuel which generates existence and rebirth (into that existence), thereby giving rise to the start of the stream of consciousness that is at the heart of the new life."

Furthermore, dependent origination explains rebirth without appeal to an unchanging self or soul (atman). Paul Williams sees dependent origination as closely connected with the doctrine of not-self (anatman) which rejects the idea there is an unchanging essence that moves across lives. Williams cites the Mahatanhasankhaya Sutta as showing how dependent origination is to be seen as an alternative theory to such views. According to Williams, dependent origination allows the Buddha to replace a view of the world based on unchanging selves "with an appeal to what he sees as being its essentially dynamic nature, a dynamism of experiences based on the centrality of causal conditioning."

Bhikkhu Analayo writes that "dependent arising is the other side of the coin of emptiness, in the sense of the absence of a substantial and unchanging entity anywhere in subjective experience. Experience or existence is nothing but conditions. This leaves no room for positing a self of any type."

According to Eisel Mazard, the twelve Nidanas are a description of "a sequence of stages prior to birth", as an "orthodox defense against any doctrine of a 'supernal self' or soul of any kind [...] excluding an un-mentioned life-force (jīva) that followers could presume to be additional to the birth of the body, the arising of consciousness, and the other aspects mentioned in the 12-links formula." (Note: Mazard: "[T]he 12-links formula is unambiguously an ancient tract that was originally written on the subject of the conception and development of the embryo, as a sequence of stages prior to birth; in examining the primary source text, this is as blatant today as it was over two thousand years ago, despite some very interesting misinterpretations that have arisen in the centuries in-between [...] In the Mahānidāna [sutta]'s brief gloss on the term nāmarūpa [...] we have a very explicit reminder that the subject-matter being described in this sequence of stages is the development of the embryo [...] it is indisputably clear that we are reading about something that may (or may not) enter into (okkamissatha) the mother's womb (mātukucchismiŋ) [...] [T]he passage is wildly incongruent with attempts of many other interpreters to render the whole doctrine in more abstract terms (variously psychological or metaphysical).) According to Mazard, "many later sources have digressed from the basic theme and subject-matter of the original text, knowingly or unknowingly."

===== Abhidharma three life model =====
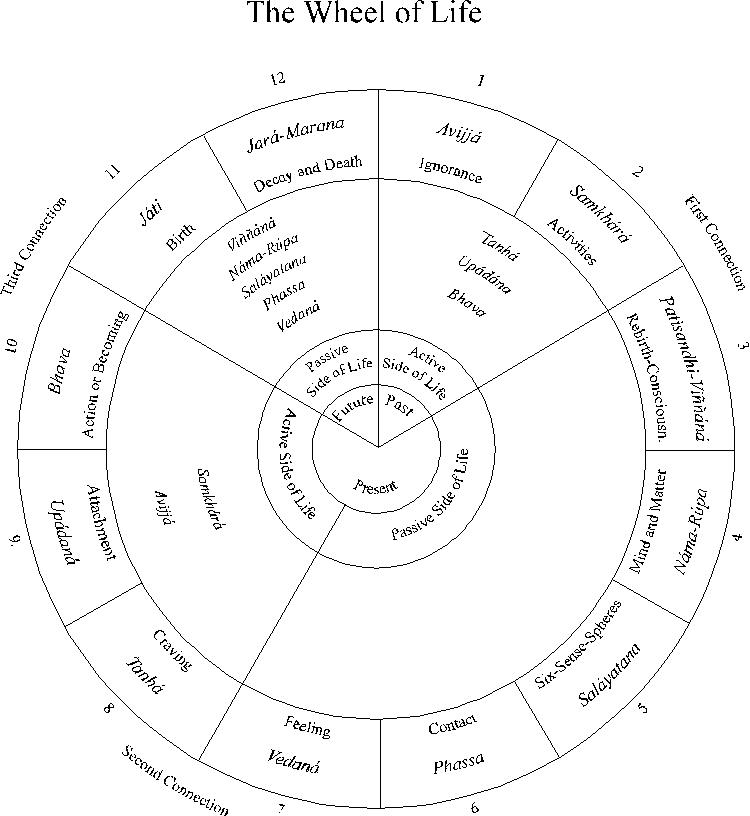
A circular schema of the 12 nidanas as understood in Theravada Buddhist scholasticism

In the Buddhist Abhidharma traditions like the Theravāda, more systematized explanations of the twelve nidanas developed. As an expository device, the commentarial traditions of the Theravāda, sarvāstivāda-vaibhasika and sautrantika schools defended an interpretation which saw the 12 factors as a sequence that spanned three lives. This is sometimes referred to as the "prolonged" explanation of dependent origination.

The three life interpretation can first be seen in the Paṭisambhidāmagga (I.275, circa 2nd or 3rd c. BCE). It is also defended by the Theravāda scholar Buddhaghosa (c. fifth century CE) in his influential Visuddhimagga (Vism.578–8I) and it became standard in Theravada. The three-lives model, with its "embryological" interpretation which links dependent origination with rebirth was also promoted by the Sarvāstivāda school as evidenced by the Abhidharmakosa (AKB.III.21–4) of Vasubandhu (fl. 4th to 5th century CE) and the Jñanaprasthana. Wayman notes that this model is also present in Asanga's Abhidharmasamuccaya and is commented on by Nagarjuna.

The three lives interpretation can be broken down as follows: (Note: Bhikkhi Bodhi briefly explains this interpretation as follows: "Due to ignorance-formally defined as non-knowledge of the Four Noble Truths-a person engages in ethically motivated action, which may be wholesome or unwholesome, bodily, verbal, or mental. These actions, referred to here as volitional formations, constitute kamma. At the time of rebirth kamma conditions the re-arising of consciousness, which comes into being bringing along its psychophysical adjuncts, "mentality-materiality" (niima-nipa). In dependence on the psychophysical adjuncts, the six sense bases develop---the five outer senses and the mind-base. Through these, contact takes place between consciousness and its objects, and contact in turn conditions feeling. In response to feeling craving springs up, and if it grows firm, leads into clinging. Driven by clinging actions are perfonned with the potency to generate new existence. These actions, kamma backed by craving, eventually bring a new existence: birth followed by aging and death.)

- The previous life: the first two nidanas, namely ignorance and mental fabrications. They are basis for the events in the present. Nyanatiloka, writing from a traditional Theravada perspective, calls these "karma process" (kamma-bhava).
- The present life: The third to the tenth nidanas (consciousness, nama-rupa, the sense bases, contact, feeling, craving, clinging, becoming) relate to the present life. This begins with the descent of vijnana (consciousness, perception) into the womb. Nyanatiloka notes that nidanas 3-7 are part of the "rebirth process" (uppatti-bhava) and nidanas are 8-10 are "karma process". (Note: According to Keown, the first five nidanas of the present life relate to one's present destiny, and condition the present life's existence. The next three dependent originations, namely craving, indulgence and gestation foster the fruits of the present destiny.)
- The future life: The last two nidanas (birth, old age and death) represent the future lives conditioned by the present causes. Nyanatiloka states these last two nidanas are a "rebirth process".

Bhikkhu Bodhi notes that this distribution of the 12 nidanas into three lives "is an expository device employed for the purpose of exhibiting the inner dynamics of the round. It should not be read as implying hard and fast divisions, for in lived experience the factors are always intertwined." Furthermore, Bodhi argues that these twelve causes are not something hidden, but are "the fundamental pattern of experience" which "always present, always potentially accessible to our awareness."

Nagarjuna's Pratityasamutpada-hrdaya-karika also outlines the 12 nidanas as a rebirth process. According to Wayman, Nagarjuna's explanation is as follows: "the three defilements – nescience, craving, and indulgence – give rise to the two karmas – motivations and gestation – and that these two give rise to the seven sufferings – perception, name-and-form, six sense bases, contact, feelings, re-birth, and old age and death." Vasubandhu's presentation is fully consistent with Nagarjuna's: "nescience, craving, and indulgence are defilement; motivations and gestations are karma; the remaining seven are the basis (asraya) as well as the fruit (phala).

As outlined by Wayman, Asanga's Abhidharma-samuccaya divides the nidanas into the following groups:

- Nidanas 1, 2 and 3 which cast beings downward into the whirl of transmigration
- Nidanas 4 to 7 represent what undergoes transmigration, "the aspects of the person undergoing phenomenal life" (Wayman).
- Nidanas 8, 9, 10 produce new karma
- Nidanas 11 and 12 are the fruits or results of karma produced previously

According to Gombrich, the "contorted" three lives interpretation is rendered unnecessary by the analysis provided by Jurewicz and other scholars which show that the 12 link chain is a composite list.

=== Mental processes ===
The twelve nidanas have also been interpreted within various Buddhist traditions as explaining the arising of psychological or phenomenological processes in the present moment or across a series of moments.

==== Abhidharma interpretations ====
Prayudh Payutto notes that in Buddhaghosa's Sammohavinodani, a commentary to the Vibhaṅga, the principle of dependent origination is explained as occurring entirely within the space of one mind moment. Furthermore, according to Payutto, there is material in the Vibhaṅga which discusses both models, the three lifetimes model (at Vibh.147) and the one mind moment model. Similarly, Cox notes that the Sarvastivadin Vijñānakāya contains two interpretations of dependent origination, one which explains the 12 nidanas as functioning in a single moment as a way to account for ordinary experience and another interpretation that understands the 12 nidanas as arising sequentially, emphasizing their role in the functioning of rebirth and karma.

Wayman notes that an interpretation referring to mental processes (referred to as dependent origination with a transient character) can also be found in northern sources, such as the Jñānaprasthāna, the Arthaviniscaya-tika and the Abhidharmakosa (AKB.III.24d). The Jñānaprasthāna, explains the nidanas with the example of the act of killing. Ignorance leads to the motivation to kill, which is acted on through consciousness, name and form and so on. This leads to mental karma being generated (bhava) which leads to the movement of the hand to kill (birth).

The different interpretations of dependent origination as understood in the northern tradition can be found in the Abhidharmakosa, which outlines three models of the twelve nidanas:

1. Instantaneous – All 12 links "are realized in one and the same moment".
2. Prolonged – The interdependence and causal relationship of dharmas is seen as arising at different times (across three lifetimes).
3. Serial – The causal relationship of the twelve links arising and ceasing in a continuous series of mind moments.

==== Modern interpretations ====
The interpretation of dependent origination as mainly referring to mental processes has been defended by various modern scholars such as Eviatar Shulman and Collett Cox.

Eviatar Shulman argues that dependent origination only addresses "the way the mind functions in samsara, the processes of mental conditioning that transmigration consists of." He further argues that it "should be understood to be no more than an inquiry into the nature of the self (or better, the lack of a self)." Shulman grants that there are some ontological implications that may be gleaned from dependent origination. However, he argues that at its core dependent origination is concerned with "identifying the different processes of mental conditioning and describing their relations". For Shulman, dependent origination does not "deal with how things exist, but with the processes by which the mind operates."

Shulman argues that the general principle of dependent origination deals exclusively with the processes outlined in the lists of nidanas (not with existence per se, and certainly not with all objects). Shulman writes that seeing dependent origination as referring to the nature of reality in general "means investing the words of the earlier teachings with meanings derived from later Buddhist discourse" which leads to a misrepresentation of early Buddhism.

Sue Hamilton presents a similar interpretation which sees dependent origination as showing how all things and indeed our entire "world" (of experience) are dependently originated through our cognitive apparatus. As such, Hamilton argues that the focus of this teaching is on our subjective experience, not on anything external to it. Collett Cox also sees the theory of dependent origination found in the early Buddhist sources as an analysis of how suffering is produced in our experience. Cox states that it is only in later Abhidharma literature that dependent origination became an abstract theory of causation.

A similar interpretation has been put forth by Bhikkhu Buddhadasa who argues that, in the list of the twelve nidanas, jati and jaramarana refer not to rebirth and physical death, but to the birth and death of our self-concept, the "emergence of the ego". According to Buddhadhasa,

...dependent arising is a phenomenon that lasts an instant; it is impermanent. Therefore, Birth and Death must be explained as phenomena within the process of dependent arising in everyday life of ordinary people. Right Mindfulness is lost during contacts of the Roots and surroundings. Thereafter, when vexation due to greed, anger, and ignorance is experienced, the ego has already been born. It is considered as one 'birth'".

Ñāṇavīra Thera is another modern Theravada Bhikkhu known for rejecting the traditional interpretation and instead explaining the 12 links as a structural schema which does not happen in successive moments in time, but is instead a timeless structure of experience.

=== Mahāyāna interpretations ===
Mahāyāna Buddhism, which sees dependent arising as closely connected with the doctrine of emptiness, strongly expresses that all phenomena and experiences are empty of independent identity. This is especially important for the madhyamaka school, one of the most influential traditions of Mahayana thought. The yogacara school meanwhile, understands dependent origination through its idealistic philosophy and sees dependent origination as the process that produces the illusory subject-object duality.

One of the most important and widely cited sutras on dependent origination in the Indian Mahayana tradition was the Śālistamba Sūtra (Rice Seedling Sutra). This sutra introduced the well-known Mahayana simile of a rice seed and its sprout as a way to explain conditionality. It also contains the influential passage: "He who sees dependent arising sees the dharma. He who sees the dharma sees the Buddha." This sutra contains numerous passages which parallel the early Buddhist sources (such as MN 38) and outlines the classic 12 nidanas. It also contains some unique elements such as the figure of Maitreya, the idea of illusion (māyā) and the idea of the dharmaśarīra (dharma-body). Numerous commentaries were written on this sutra, some of which are attributed to Nāgārjuna (but this is questionable).

==== Non-arising ====
Some Mahāyāna sūtras contain statements which speak of the "unarisen" or "unproduced" (anutpāda) nature of dharmas. According to Edward Conze, in the Prajñāpāramitā sutras, the ontological status of dharmas can be described as having never been produced (anutpāda), as never been brought forth (anabhinirvritti), as well as unborn (ajata). This is illustrated through various similies such as a dream, an illusion and a mirage. Conze also states that the "patient acceptance of the non-arising of dharmas" (anutpattika-dharmakshanti) is "one of the most distinctive virtues of the Mahāyānistic saint."

Perhaps the earliest of these sutras, the Aṣṭasāhasrikā Prajñāpāramitā, contains a passage which describes the suchness (tathatā) of dharmas using various terms including shūnyatā, cessation (nirodha) and unarisen (anutpāda). Most famously, the Heart Sutra states:

Sariputra, in that way, all phenomena are empty, that is, without characteristic, unproduced, unceased, stainless, not stainless, undiminished, unfilled.

The Heart Sutra also negates the 12 links of dependent origination: "There is no ignorance, no extinction of ignorance, up to and including no aging and death and no extinction of aging and death."

Some Mahāyāna sūtras present the insight into the non-arisen nature of dharmas as a great achievement of bodhisattvas. The Amitāyurdhyāna Sūtra mentions that Vaidehi had, on listening to the teaching in this sutra, attained "great awakening with clarity of mind and reached the insight into the non-arising of all dharmas." Similarly, the Vimalakirti sutra mentions various bodhisattvas (including Vimalakirti) that have attained "the forbearance of the nonarising of dharmas." The Lotus Sutra states that when the "thought of the highest path" arises in sentient beings "they will become convinced of the nonarising of all dharmas and reside in the stage of non-retrogression."

The Samdhinirmochana Sutra's chapter 7 mentions a teaching which states: "All phenomena are without an essence, unborn, unceasing, primordially in the state of peace, and naturally in the state of nirvāṇa." However, it states that this teaching is that of the "discourses of provisional meaning", and that it should be taught along with the teachings of the third turning of the wheel of Dharma. Similarly, the Lankavatara sutra explains the doctrine of the unborn and unoriginated nature of dharmas through the idealistic philosophy of mind-only. Since all things are illusory manifestations of the mind, they do not really originate or arise.

==== Madhyamaka ====
In madhyamaka philosophy, to say that an object dependently originated is synonymous with saying that it is "empty" (shunya). This is directly stated by Nāgārjuna in his Mūlamadhyamakakārikā (MMK):

Whatever arises dependently, is explained as empty. Thus dependent attribution, is the middle way. Since there is nothing whatever, that is not dependently existent. For that reason, there is nothing whatsoever that is not empty. – MMK, Ch. 24.18–19

According to Nāgārjuna, all phenomena (dharmas) are empty of svabhāva (variously translated as essence, intrinsic nature, inherent existence, and own being) which refers to a self-sustaining, causally independent and permanent identity. Nāgārjuna's philosophical works analyze all phenomena in order to show that nothing at all can exist independently, and yet, they are also not non-existent since they exist conventionally, i.e. as empty dependent arisings. In the very first (dedicatory) verse of the MMK, dependent origination is also described apophatically through "the eight negations" as follows "there is neither cessation nor origination, neither annihilation nor the eternal, neither singularity nor plurality, neither the coming nor the going of any dharma, for the purpose of nirvāṇa characterized by the auspicious cessation of hypostatization [prapañca]."

The first chapter of the MMK focuses on the general idea of causation and attempts to show how it is a process that is empty of any essence. According to Jay Garfield, in the first chapter, Nāgārjuna argues against a reified view of causality which sees dependent origination in terms of substantial powers (kriyā) of causation (hetu) that phenomena have as part of their intrinsic nature (svabhāva). Instead, Nāgārjuna sees dependent origination as a series of conditional relationships (pratyaya) that are merely nominal designations and "explanatorily useful regularities". According to Nāgārjuna, if something could exist inherently or essentially from its own side (and thus have its own inherent causal powers), change and dependent arising would be impossible. Nāgārjuna states that "if things did not exist without essence, the phrase, "when this exists so this will be," would not be acceptable."

Jan Westerhoff notes that Nāgārjuna argues that cause and effect are "neither identical nor different nor related as part and whole, they are neither successive, nor simultaneous, nor overlapping." Westerhoff states that Nāgārjuna thinks all conceptual frameworks of causality that make use of such ideas are based on a mistaken presupposition which is that "cause and effect exist with their own svabhāva". Westerhoff further argues that for Nāgārjuna, causes and effects are both dependent on one another (conceptually and existentially) and neither one can exist independently. As such, he rejects four ways that something could be causally produced: by itself, by something else, by both, by nothing at all. Westerhoff also notes that for Nāgārjuna, cause and effect do not exist objectively, that is to say, they are not independent of a cognizing subject. As such, cause and effect are "not just mutually interdependent, but also mind-dependent." This means that for Nāgārjuna, causality and causally constructed objects are ultimately just conceptual constructs.

Nāgārjuna applies a similar analysis to numerous other kinds of phenomena in the MMK such as motion, the self, and time. Chapter 7 of the MMK attempts to argue against the idea that dependent arising exists either as a conditioned entity or as an unconditioned one. Rejecting both options, Nāgārjuna ends this chapter by stating that dependent arising is like an illusion, a dream or a city of gandharvas (a stock example for a mirage). Chapter 20 tackles the question of whether an assemblage of causes and conditions can produce an effect (it is argued that it cannot). This analysis of dependent arising therefore means that emptiness itself is empty. As Jay Garfield explains, this means that emptiness (and thus dependent origination) "is not a self-existent void standing behind the veil of illusion represented by conventional reality, but merely an aspect of conventional reality."

==== Yogācāra ====
The yogācāra school interpreted the doctrine of dependent origination through its central schema of the "three natures" (which are really three ways of looking at one dependently originated reality). In this schema, the constructed or fabricated nature is an illusory appearance (of a dualistic self), while the "dependent nature" refers specifically to the process of dependent origination or as Jonathan Gold puts it "the causal story that brings about this seeming self." Furthermore, as Gold notes, in Yogacara, "this causal story is entirely mental," and so our body, sense bases and so on are illusory appearances. Indeed, D.W. Mitchell writes that yogācāra sees consciousness as "the causal force" behind dependent arising.

Dependent origination is therefore "the causal series according to which the mental seeds planted by previous deeds ripen into the appearance of the sense bases". This "stream of dependent mental processes" as Harvey describes it, is what generates the subject-object split (and thus the idea of a '"self" and "other" things which are not the self). The third nature then, is the fact that dependent origination is empty of a self, the fact that even though self (as well as an "other", that which is apart from the self) appears, it does not exist.

==== The 12 nidanas in Mahāyāna sutras and tantras ====
Alex Wayman writes that Mahāyāna texts such as Śrīmālādevī Siṃhanāda Sūtra present an alternative interpretation of the twelve nidanas. According to Wayman, this interpretation holds that arhats, pratyekabuddhas, and bodhisattvas have eliminated the four kinds of clinging (nidana # 9), which are the usual condition for existence (or "gestation", nidana #10) and rebirth (#11) in one of the three realms. Instead of being reborn, they have a "body made of mind" (manōmaya kāya), which is a special consciousness (vijñana). This consciousness is projected by ignorance (nidana #1) and purified by a special kind of samskara (# 2) called "nonfluxional karma" (anāsrava-karma). These mind-made bodies produce a reflected image in the three worlds, and thus they appear to be born.

According to Wayman, this view of dependent origination posits "a dualistic structure of the world, in the manner of heaven and earth, where the "body made of mind" is in heaven and its reflected image, or coarser equivalent, is on earth. Otherwise stated, the early members of Dependent Origination apply to the superior realm, the later members to the inferior realm. But the Śrī-mālā-Sūtra does not clarify how those members are allotted to their respective realms."

According to Wayman, similar interpretations appear in tantric texts, such as the Caṇḍamahāroṣaṇatantra. This tantra contains a passage which appears to suggest that "the first ten terms of dependent origination are prenatal." He also notes that there is a tantric interpretation of dependent origination in the Guhyasamājatantra, "in which the first three members are equivalent to three mystical light stages.

==== Tibetan interpretations ====
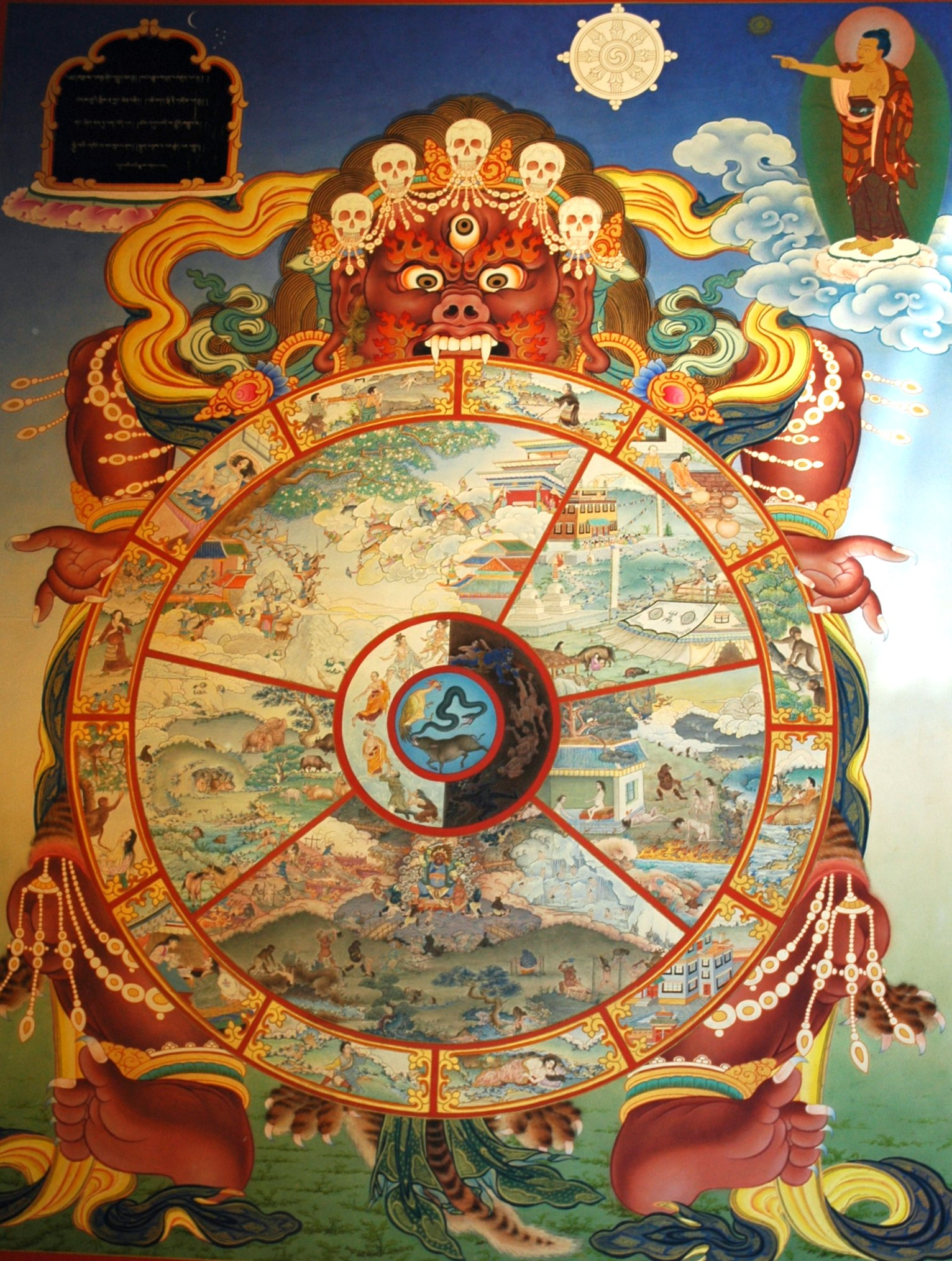
In Tibetan Buddhism, the 12 nidanas are typically shown on the outer rim of a wheel of existence. This is a common genre of art found in Tibetan temples and monasteries. The three poisons (greed, hatred and delusion) sit at the very center of wheel.

Tibetan Buddhist scholars rely on the north Indian works of scholars such as Asanga, Vasubandhu and Nagarjuna in their interpretation of the 12 nidanas. For example, according to Wayman, Tsongkhapa, attempted to harmonize the presentations of the 12 links found in Nagarjuna and in Asanga. Tsongkhapa also explains how the twelve nidanas can be applied to one life of a single person, two lives of a single person, and three lives of a single person.

Discussing the three lifetimes model, Alex Wayman states that the Theravada interpretation is different from the Vajrayana view, because the Vajrayana view places a bardo or an intermediate state (which is denied in Theravada) between death and rebirth. The Tibetan Buddhism tradition allocates the twelve nidanas differently between various lives.

Madhyamaka is interpreted in different ways by different traditions. Some scholars accept a version of the shentong view introduced by Dolpopa (1292–1361), which argues that buddha-nature and buddhahood was not dependently originated and thus not empty of itself (but empty of what is not itself). The Gelug school which follows Tsongkhapa's thought rejects this view, and instead holds that all phenomena are said to lack 'inherent' existence (svabhava) and thus, everything is empty and dependently originated. Other Tibetan madhyamakas like Gorampa argue for a more anti-realist view, negating the very existence of all phenomena and seeing them all as illusions. Meanwhile, scholars of the Nyingma school such as Ju Mipham have also attempted to interpret orthodox madhyamaka in a way that is compatible with the view of dzogchen.

==== Interdependence ====
The Huayan school taught the doctrine of the mutual containment and interpenetration of all phenomena (yuánróng, 圓融), as expressed in the metaphor of Indra's net. One thing contains all other existing things, and all existing things contain that one thing. This philosophy is based on the Avatamsaka Sutra and the writings of the patriarchs of Huayan.

Thích Nhất Hạnh explains this concept as follows: "You cannot just be by yourself alone. You have to inter-be with every other thing." He uses the example of a sheet of paper that can only exist due to every other cause and condition (sunshine, rain, trees, people, the mind etc). According to Hanh "this sheet of paper is, because everything else is."

Sogyal Rinpoche states all things, when seen and understood in their true relation, are not independent but interdependent with all other things. A tree, for example, cannot be isolated from anything else. It has no independent existence.

According to Richard Gombrich, the East Asian interpretation of dependent origination as the idea that "all phenomena exert causal influence on each other" does not follow from the early Buddhist understanding of dependent origination. He further argues that this interpretation "would subvert the Buddha's teaching of karma." This is because "if we were heirs of other people's deeds, the whole moral edifice would collapse."

== Comparison with western philosophy ==
The concept of pratītyasamutpāda has also been compared to Western metaphysics, the study of reality. Schilbrack states that the doctrine of interdependent origination seems to fit the definition of a metaphysical teaching, by questioning whether there is anything at all. Hoffman disagrees, and asserts that pratītyasamutpāda should not be considered a metaphysical doctrine in the strictest sense, since it does not confirm nor deny specific entities or realities. (Note: Hoffman states: "Suffice it to emphasize that the doctrine of dependent origination is not a metaphysical doctrine, in the sense that it does not affirm or deny some super-sensible entities or realities; rather, it is a proposition arrived at through an examination and analysis of the world of phenomena ...")

The Hellenistic philosophy of Pyrrhonism parallels the Buddhist view of dependent origination, as it does in many other matters (see: similarities between Phyrrhonism and Buddhism). Aulus Gellius in Attic Nights describes how appearances are produced by relative interactions between mind and body and how there are no self-dependent things. The ancient Commentary on Plato's Theaetetus also defends a kind of relativism which states that nothing has its own intrinsic character.

Jay L. Garfield states that Nagarjuna's Mulamadhyamikakarika uses the causal relation to understand the nature of reality, and of our relation to it. This attempt is similar to the use of causation by Hume, Kant, and Schopenhauer as they present their arguments. Nagarjuna uses causation to present his arguments on how one individualizes objects, orders one's experience of the world, and understands agency in the world.

== See also ==
- Abhidharma, an analytical part of the Tripiṭaka, the Buddhist canon
- Anattā
- Anutpada
- Interbeing
- Paṭṭhāna
- Reality in Buddhism
- Three marks of existence
- Ye Dharma Hetu

== Sources ==
- Analayo (2007), "Rebirth and the Gandhabba" (PDF), Journal of Buddhist Studies, 1: 91–105
- Anyen Rinpoche (2012), Journey to Certainty, Wisdom Publications
- Boisvert, Mathieu (1995), The Five Aggregates: Understanding Theravada Psychology and Soteriology, Wilfrid Laurier University Press, ISBN 978-0-88920-257-3
- Bowker, John, ed. (1997), The Oxford Dictionary of World Religions, Oxford
- Bucknell, Roderick S. (1999), "Conditioned Arising Evolves: Variation and Change in Textual Accounts of the Paticca-samupadda Doctrine", Journal of the International Association of Buddhist Studies, 22 (2)
- Buddhaghosa (2010), The Path of Purification (Visuddhimagga), translated by Bhikkhu Ñāṇamoli (4th ed.), Kandy, Sri Lanka: Buddhist Publication Society, ISBN 978-955-24-0023-0
- Dalai Lama (1992), The Meaning of Life, translated and edited by Jeffrey Hopkins, Wisdom
- Dzongsar Jamyang Khyentse (2011), What Makes You Not a Buddhist, Shambhala, Kindle Edition
- Edelglass, William; et al. (2009), Buddhist Philosophy: Essential Readings, Oxford University Press, ISBN 978-0-19-532817-2
- Frauwallner, Erich (1973), "Chapter 5. The Buddha and the Jina", History of Indian Philosophy: The philosophy of the Veda and of the epic. The Buddha and the Jina. The Sāmkhya and the classical Yoga-system, Motilal Banarsidass
- Garfield, Jay L. (1994), Dependent Arising and the Emptiness of Emptiness: Why did Nagarjuna start with Causation?, Philosophy East and West, Volume 44, Number 2 April 1994, archived from the original on 7 May 2010
- Geshe Sonam Rinchen (2006), How Karma Works: The Twelve Links of Dependent Arising, Snow Lion
- Gethin, Rupert (1998), Foundations of Buddhism, Oxford University Press, ISBN 978-0-19-289223-2
- Goldstein, Joseph (2002), One Dharma: The Emerging Western Buddhism, HarperCollins
- Gombrich, Richard (2009), "Chaper 9. Causation and non-random process", What the Buddha Thought, Equinox
- Goodman, Steven D. (1992), Situational Patterning: Pratītyasamutpāda. Footsteps on the Diamond Path (Crystal Mirror Series; v. 1-3), Dharma Publishing
- Harvey, Peter (1990), An Introduction to Buddhism, Cambridge University Press
- Harvey, Peter (2015), "The Conditioned Co-arising of Mental and Bodily Processes within Life and Between Lives", in Emmanuel, Steven M. (ed.), A Companion to Buddhist Philosophy, John Wiley & Sons, ISBN 978-1-119-14466-3
- Hoffman, Frank J.; et al. (1996), Pāli Buddhism, Routledge, ISBN 978-0-7007-0359-3
- Hopkins, Jeffrey (1983), Meditation on Emptiness, Wisdom Publications, ISBN 978-0-86171-014-0
- Jones, Dhivan Thomas (2009), "New Light on the Twelve Nidanas", Contemporary Buddhism, 10 (2): 241–259, doi:10.1080/14639940903239793, S2CID 145413087
- Jurewicz, Joanna (2000), "Playing with Fire: The pratityasamutpada from the perspective of Vedic thought" (PDF), Journal of the Pali Text Society, 26: 77–103, archived from the original (PDF) on 9 April 2015
- Lama Zopa Rinpoche (2009), How Things Exist: Teachings on Emptiness, Lama Yeshe Wisdom Archive, Kindle Edition
- Lopez, Donald S. (2001), The Story of Buddhism, HarperCollins
- Mabja Tsondru (2011), Ornament of Reason, Snow Lion
- McEvilley, Thomas (2002), The Shape of Ancient Thought
- Polak, Grzegorz (2011), Reexamining Jhana: Towards a Critical Reconstruction of Early Buddhist Soteriology, UMCS
- Ronkin, Noa (2009), "Theravada Metaphysics and Ontology", in Edelglass; et al. (eds.), Buddhist Philosophy: Essential Readings, Oxford University Press, ISBN 978-0-19-532817-2
- Schilbrack, Kevin (2002), Thinking through Myths: Philosophical Perspectives, Routledge, ISBN 978-0-415-25461-8
- Schumann, Hans Wolfgang (1974), Buddhism: an outline of its teachings and schools, Theosophical Pub. House
- Schumann, Hans Wolfgang (1997) [1976], Boeddhisme. Stichter, scholen, systemen (Buddhismus - Stifter, Schulen und Systemen), Asoka
- Shulman, Eviatar (2008), "Early Meanings of Dependent-Origination" (PDF), Journal of Indian Philosophy, 36 (2): 297–317, doi:10.1007/s10781-007-9030-8, S2CID 59132368, archived from the original (PDF) on 10 October 2016
- Smith, Huston; Novak, Philip (2009), Buddhism: A Concise Introduction, HarperOne, Kindle Edition
- Sogyal Rinpoche (2009), The Tibetan Book of Living and Dying, Harper Collins, Kindle Edition
- Thanissaro Bhikkhu (2008), The Shape of Suffering: A study of Dependent Co-arising (PDF), Metta Forest Monastery, archived from the original (PDF) on 30 May 2013
- Thich Nhat Hanh (1999), The Heart of the Buddha's Teaching, Three River Press
- Waldron, William S. (2004), The Buddhist Unconsciousness. The alaya-vijñana in the context of Indian Buddhist thought, RoutledgeCurzon
- Walpola Rahula (2007), What the Buddha Taught, Grove Press, Kindle Edition
- Walshe, Maurice (1996), The Long Discourses of the Buddha: a Translation of the Dīgha Nikāya (3rd ed.), Boston: Wisdom Publications, ISBN 978-0-86171-103-1
- Wayman, Alex (1971), "Buddhist Dependent Origination", History of Religions, 10 (3): 185–203, doi:10.1086/462628, JSTOR 1062009, S2CID 161507469
- Wayman, Alex (1984a), Dependent Origination - the Indo-Tibetan Vision in Wayman (1984)
- Wayman, Alex (1984b), The Intermediate-State Dispute in Buddhism in Wayman (1984)
- Wayman, Alex (1984), George R. Elder (ed.), Buddhist Insight: Essays by Alex Wayman, Motilall Banarsidass, ISBN 978-81-208-0675-7
- Williams, Paul (2002), Buddhist Thought, Taylor & Francis, Kindle Edition
