= Nidana =

Nidāna (निदान) is a Sanskrit and Pali word that means "cause, motivation or occasion" depending on the context. The word is derived from the Sanskrit prefix ni- (नि; "down", "into") plus the root dā (दा; "to bind"), forming the verb nidā (निदा; "to bind on, fasten"). This in turn yields the noun nidāna (निदान; lit. "a band, rope or halter"). It appears in the Rigveda, such as hymn 10.114.2, and other Hindu scriptures, wherein it means "primary or first cause, linked cause"; in other contexts, nidāna refers to the literal meaning of a rope or band that links, binds or fastens one thing to another, such as a horse to a cart. The word has been borrowed into modern languages such as Hindi and Marathi to mean "diagnosis" or "primary cause" among others.

== Buddhism ==
Nidāna is the term used to describe the standard introduction of a Buddhist sutra, where the formula "Thus have I heard" (attributed to Ānanda) is followed by a description of the location in and occasion on which the Buddha gave a particular teaching.

The other primary use of nidāna in the Buddhist tradition is in the context of the Twelve Nidānas, also called the "Twelve Links of Dependent Origination". These links present the mechanistic basis of repeated birth, saṃsāra, and resultant duḥkha (suffering, pain, unsatisfactoriness) starting from avidyā (ignorance, misconceptions).

== Hinduism ==
The term nidāna appears in numerous ancient and medieval Hindu texts wherein it means "first cause, primary cause, original or essential cause". This includes the Upanishads that include theosophical speculations, as well as medical texts such as Sushruta Samhita and Charaka Samhita, where a large sub-book is titled Nidāna Sthāna (निदानस्थान; "Pathology"), as well as in chapters of the Puranas, wherein these discuss cause of disease or various natural phenomena.

== See also ==
- Vipassana
- Samādhi
- Dhyāna in Buddhism
- Samatha
