= Religious Confucianism =

Confucianism as a religion

Chinese name
- Chinese: 儒教
- Literal meaning: Ru religious doctrine
Transcriptions
Standard Mandarin
- Hanyu Pinyin: Rújiào
Yue: Cantonese
- Jyutping: Jyu4 gaau3

Alternative Chinese name
- Chinese: 孔教
- Literal meaning: Confucius' religious doctrine
Transcriptions
Standard Mandarin
- Hanyu Pinyin: Kǒng jiào

Second alternative Chinese name
- Chinese: 儒家信仰
- Literal meaning: Ru school of thought faith
Transcriptions
Standard Mandarin
- Hanyu Pinyin: Rújiā xìnyǎng

Vietnamese name
- Vietnamese alphabet: Nho giáo
- Chữ Hán: 儒敎

Korean name
- Hangul: 유교
- Hanja: 儒敎
Transcriptions
- Revised Romanization: Yu gyo
- McCune–Reischauer: Yu kyo

Japanese name
- Kanji: 儒教
Transcriptions
- Romanization: Jyukyō

Religious Confucianism is an interpretation of Confucianism as a religion. It originated in the time of Confucius with his defense of traditional religious institutions of his time, such as the Zhongmiao rites, and the ritual and music system.

The Chinese name for religious Confucianism is Rujiao, in contrast with non-religious Confucianism, which is called Rujia. The differences can be roughly translated with jiao meaning religion, and jia meaning school, although the term Rujiao is ancient and predates this modern usage of jiao.

Ru ("Erudites") were a "small group of cultural specialists" who preserved older Zhou dynasty rituals and did scholarly work to pass down traditional Zhou "written classics" through the generations.

Religious Confucianism includes traditional Chinese patriarchal religion in its practice, leading some scholars to call it Tianzuism (Chinese: 天祖教; pinyin: Tiānzǔjiào; lit. 'Church of Heaven and Ancestors') instead to avoid confusion with non-religious Confucianism. It includes such practices as heaven sacrifice, jisi, and fengshan.

Elements include the deification and worship of Confucius, the seventy-two disciples, Mencius, Zhu Xi, and Shangdi.

Religious Confucianism has had state sponsorship since the Han dynasty, and in all subsequent major dynasties until the 1911 Revolution. The Four Books and Five Classics became the jurisprudential basis of the national code and the Chinese legal system, as well as the Spring and Autumn Courts. At the end of the Han dynasty, religious Confucianism was widespread. Religious Confucian organizations known as Confucian churches, which emerged during the Qing dynasty, have significant popularity among overseas Chinese people today.

Today, South Korea and the Jongmyo Shrine lead religious Confucianism, and in 2026, they held an official Confucian-Catholic dialogue with the Vatican Catholic Church.

== The origin and development of Religious Confucianism ==
According to He Guanghu, Confucianism is a continuation of the official religion of the Shang and Zhou dynasties (c. 1600–256 BCE) or the main indigenous religion in China for three thousand years. Both dynasties worshipped the supreme deity named Shangdi (上帝; 'Highest Deity'), also known simply as Di (帝) by the Shang and Tian (天; 'Heaven') by the Zhou.

=== Proto-Chinese ===
Prior to the formation of Chinese civilisation and the spread of world religions in East Asia, local tribes shared animistic, shamanic, and totemic worldviews. Mediatory figures, like shamans, directly communicated prayers and made sacrifices or offerings to the spiritual realm, a tradition that persists in some contemporary Chinese religions.

Ancient shamanism in particular is connected to ancient Neolithic cultures, such as the Hongshan culture. The Flemish philosopher Ulrich Libbrecht traces the origins of some features of Taoism to what Jan Jakob Maria de Groot called Wuism, or, in other words, Chinese shamanism.

=== Xia-Shang ===
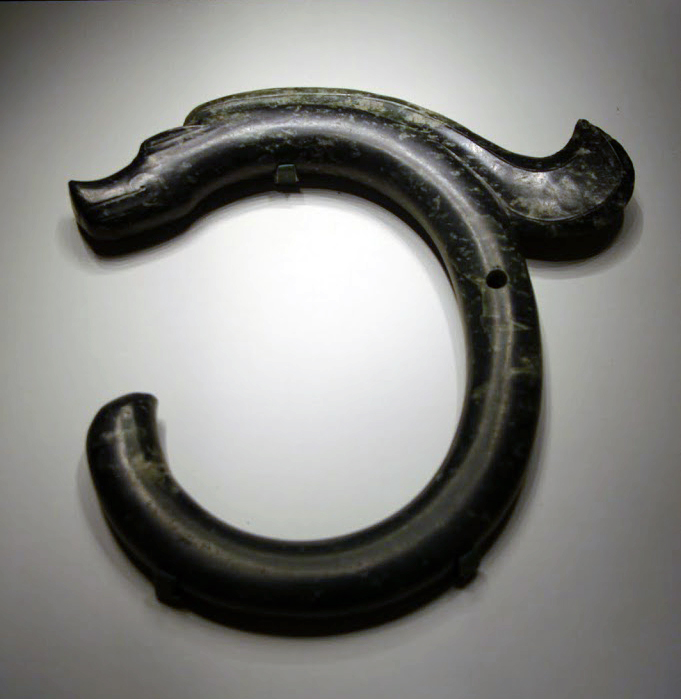
Jade dragon of the Hongshan culture. The dragon, associated with the constellation Draco winding around the north ecliptic pole, represents the "protean" primordial power, which embodies yin and yang in unity.

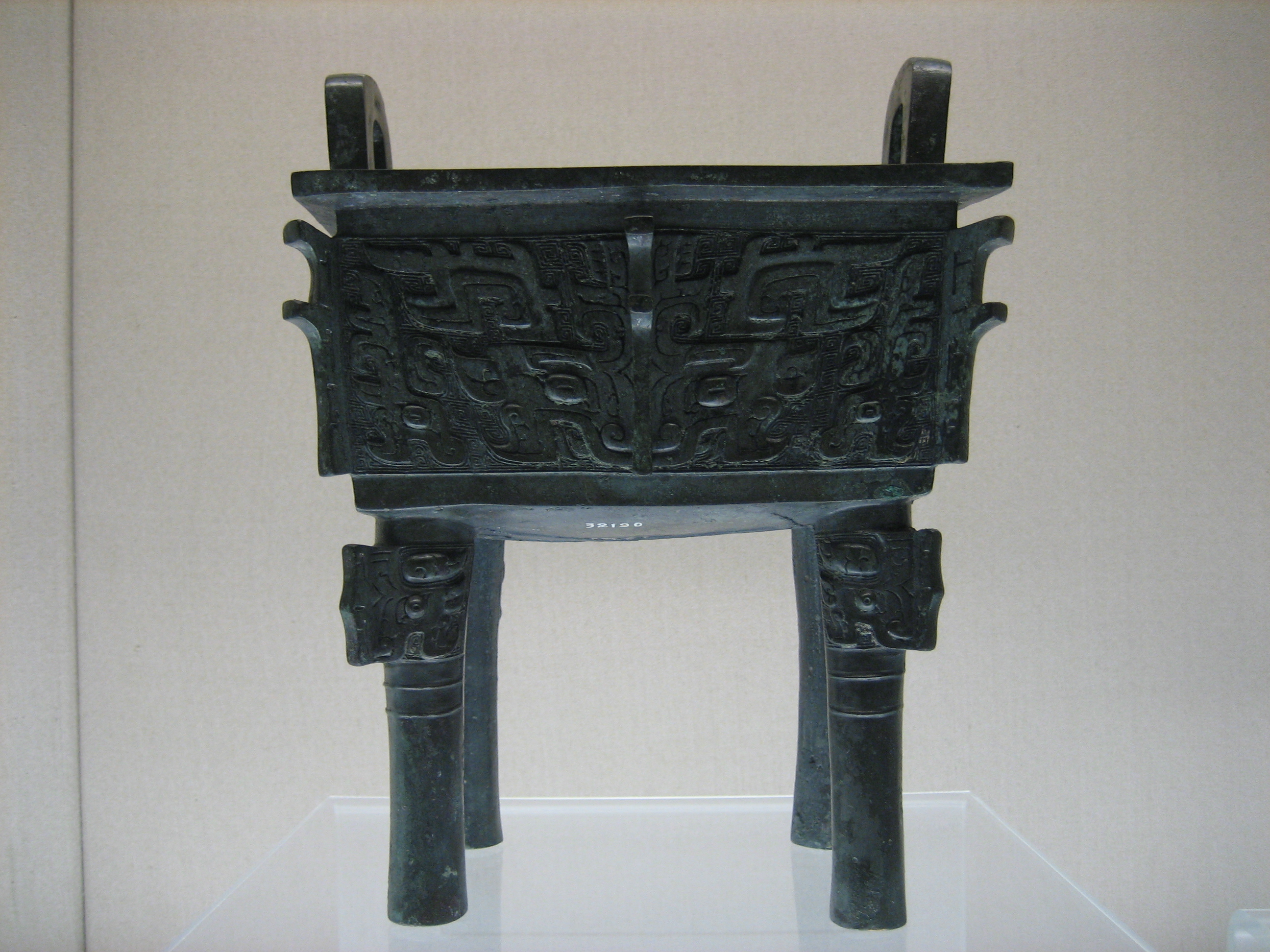
Squared dǐng (鼎) (ritual cauldron) with tāotiè (饕餮) motif. According to Didier, both the cauldrons and the taotie symmetrical faces originate as symbols of Di as the squared north celestial pole, with four faces.

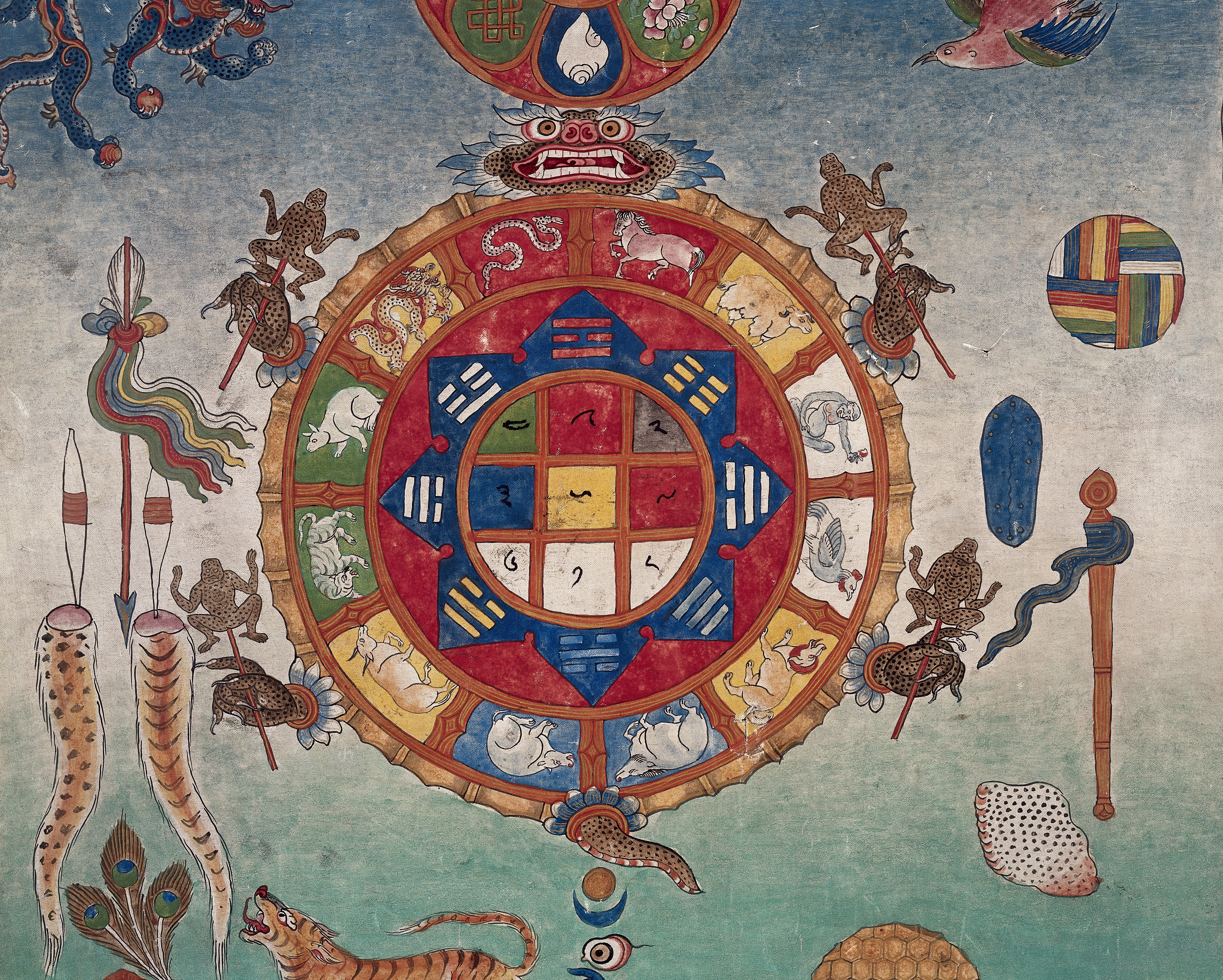
Tibetan chart for bloodletting based on the Luoshu square. The Luoshu, the Hetu, liubo boards, sundials, Han diviner's boards (式; shì) and luopan for fengshui, and the derived compass, as well as TLV mirrors, are all representations of Di as the north celestial pole.

Libbrecht distinguishes between two periods in the development of Chinese theology and religion: traditions derived from the Shang dynasty (1600–1046 BCE) and traditions derived from the Zhou dynasty (1046–256 BCE). The religion of the Shang was based on the worship of ancestors and god-kings, the souls of whom were believed to survive as unseen divine forces after death. They were not transcendent entities, as the universe was created by internal rhythms and cosmic powers, not by an external force. The royal ancestors were called di (帝; "deities"), and the primordial progenitor was Shangdi (上帝; "Highest Deity"). Shangdi was—and is—often depicted as a Chinese dragon, a symbol of limitless power (qi) and the "protean", primordial force that embodies yin and yang. Shangdi was—and is—associated with the constellation Draco, which wraps around the north ecliptic pole and slithers between Ursa Minor and Ursa Major (the "Great Chariot"). In Shang theology, the multiplicity of the gods of nature and ancestors was viewed as parts of Di, and the four fang (方; "directions" or "sides") and their feng (風; "winds") were his cosmic will.

=== Zhou ===
The Zhou dynasty was more rooted in an agricultural worldview, and they emphasised a more universal idea of Tian (天; "Heaven"). The Shang dynasty's rulers asserted that, as Shangdi was their ancestor-god, they had a divine right to rule. The Zhou transformed this descendant-based claim to power into a morality-based claim to power by creating the Mandate of Heaven. In Zhou theology, Tian had no singular earthly descendant, but bestowed divine favour on virtuous rulers. The Zhou kings declared that their victory over the Shang was because they were virtuous and loved their people, while the Shang were tyrants and thus were deprived of their power by Tian.

John C. Didier and David Pankenier relate the shapes of both the ancient Chinese characters for 帝 Di and 天 Tian to the patterns of stars in the northern skies, either drawn, in Didier's theory by connecting the constellations bracketing the north celestial pole as a square, or in Pankenier's theory by connecting some of the stars which form the constellations of the Big Dipper and broader Ursa Major, and Ursa Minor (Little Dipper). Cultures in other parts of the world have also conceived these stars or constellations as symbols of the origin of the universe, a supreme deity, divinity or royal power.

Yin is the result of the Xia rites, and the gains and losses can be known; Zhou is the result of the Yin rites, and the gains and losses can be known. The one who may succeed the Zhou, although a hundred generations, can also be known. Zhou supervised the second generation, and it was a great successor to Wen! I am from the Zhou.

— Confucius

The rituals, rules, and institutions of the Zhou dynasty were derived from those of the Xia and Shang dynasties and represented the ideal system in the minds of Confucians. Poetry, calligraphy, rituals, and music were central to the education of royal officials in the Zhou dynasty and were also known as the four teachings of ancient times. They also filled the textbooks of the Zhou nobles. The Guoyu records that Shen Shushi (申叔时) included these six ancient books in his list of teaching materials for the education of the royal princes.

Teach the Spring and Autumn Annals, and for them to shout good and suppress evil, so as to warn and advise their hearts; teach the World, and for them to show the bright virtue and abolish the dark and faint, so as to rest and fear their movements; teach the Poetry, and for them to guide the broad and obvious virtue, so as to shine the brightness of their will; teach the place, so as to know the rule of up and down; teach the music, so as to ease their meeting and subdue their floating; teach the Order, so as to visit the officials of things; teach the Language, so as to make their virtue clear, and know The first king's task is to use clear virtue in the people; teach the "Therefore", so as to know the waste and rise and fear; teach the "Discipline", so as to know the clan, the line of comparison and righteousness.

— Guoyu

Here, the Spring and Autumn Period and the World are both historical records, and the Order is about the astronomical calendar of seasonal festivals, such as the Ritual Record – Lunar Order. "Language" refers to the "State Language" and "Family Language", such as the "Confucius Family Language" that had been passed down. "Guzhi" refers to the "Letters of Zhongxu," "Letters of Tang," "Letters of Da," "Letters of Kang," "Letters of Wine," and "Letters of Luo," which Confucius included in the Shangshu. The "Disciplines" are the "Yao Dian", "Shun Dian", and "Yi Xun" from the Shangshu. Confucius brought to the people of the Zhou dynasty the knowledge that had been reserved for royal officials. Confucianism is a religious tradition based on poetry, calligraphy, rituals, and music, which was refined by Confucius' interpretation of the Five Classics. Xunzi said: "Therefore, the way of poetry, calligraphy, ritual and music is to be carried forward. The poem is its will, the book is its deeds, the ritual is its deeds, the music is its harmony, and the spring and autumn are its microcosm. Religious Confucianism takes Confucius as the supreme sage and Shangdi as the supreme god, and God assigns kings and teachers to human beings to teach and govern God's people. "Heaven sends down the people as the ruler and the teacher, but it is said that they help God and favor the four directions."

==== Origin of the term Ru ====
The character "ru" (Chinese: 儒; lit. 'scholar') referred to a jurist who was familiar with the poetry, calligraphy, rituals, and music of the Xia, Shang, and Zhou dynasties. It evolved from the four branches of shamanism, history, prayer, and divination of the Spring and Autumn Period.

According to the Fayan, the Zhou dynasty "emphasizes the five teachings of the people, as well as food, funerals, [and] sacrifices. [It] emphasize[s] honesty and righteousness, revere[s] the morally upright, and reward[s] credit where credit is due. By doing so, all under heaven will naturally achieve peace and harmony."

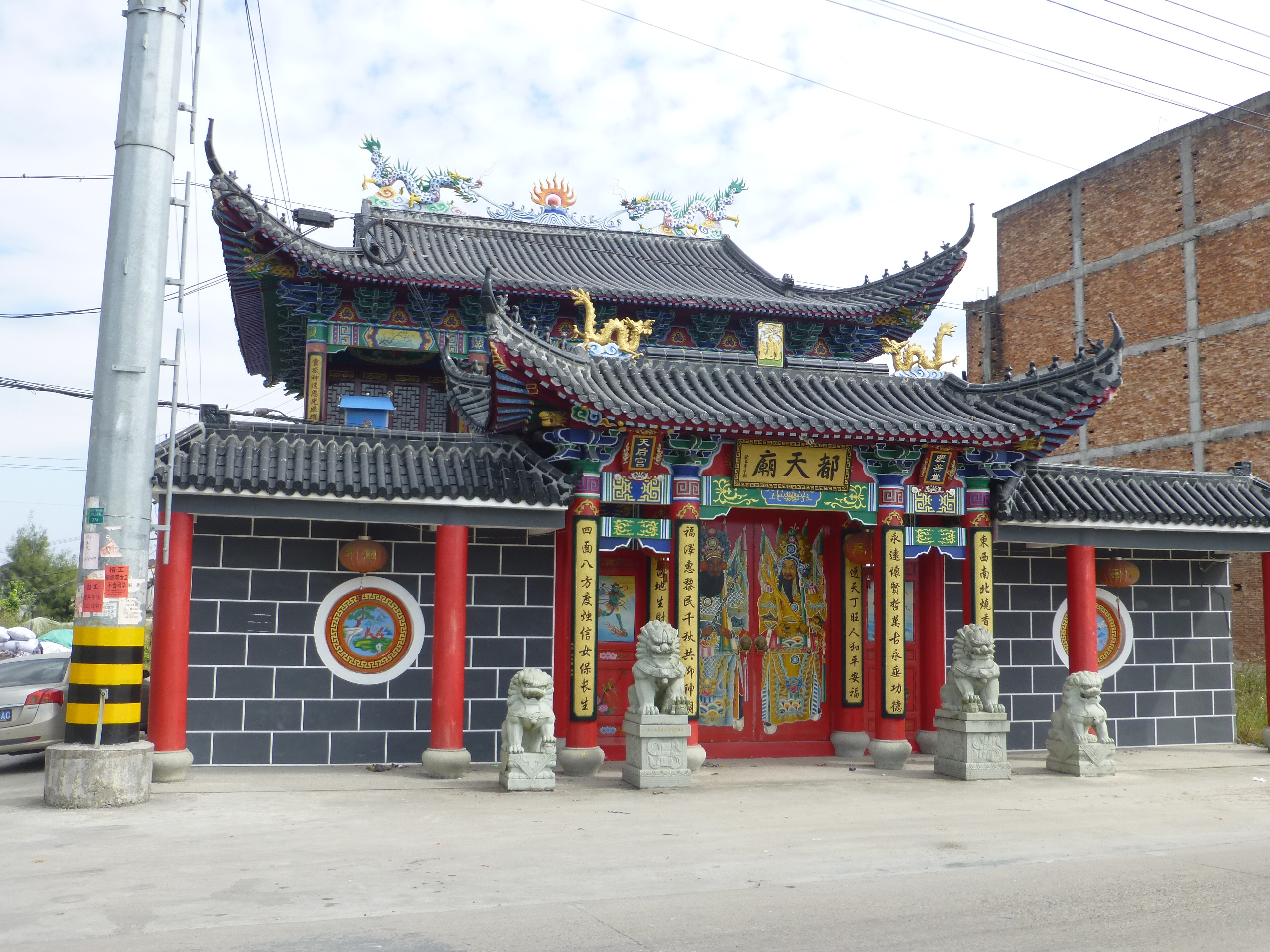
Temple of All-Heaven (都天庙; dōutiānmiào) in Longgang, Cangnan, Wenzhou, Zhejiang.

=== Latter Zhou and Warring States ===
By the 6th century BCE, the concept of Tian and the symbols that represented it on earth (architecture of cities, temples, altars and ritual cauldrons, and the Zhou ritual system) had become widespread. The Mandate of Heaven was claimed by different rulers of the Zhou states to legitimise their economic, political, and military ambitions. The divine right to rule was no longer understood to be exclusive to the Zhou royal house; it was something that could be bought by anyone able to afford the elaborate ceremonies and rites required to access the authority of Tian.

Besides the waning Zhou ritual system, what may be defined as "wild" (野; yě) traditions, or traditions "outside of the official system", developed as attempts to access the will of Tian. The population had lost faith in the official tradition, which was no longer perceived as an effective means of communication with Tian. The traditions of the "Nine Fields" (九野; Jiǔyě) and of the Yijing flourished. Chinese thinkers, faced with this challenge to legitimacy, diverged in a "Hundred Schools of Thought", each proposing its own theories for the reconstruction of the Zhou moral order.

=== Background of Confucian thought ===
The grapheme 儒; rú, meaning "scholar", "refined one", "Confucian". It is composed of 人; rén ("man") and 需; xū ("to await"), itself composed of 雨; yǔ ("rain", "instruction") and 而; ér ("sky"), graphically a "man under the rain". Its full meaning is "man receiving instruction from Heaven". According to Kang Youwei, Hu Shih, and Yao Xinzhong, they were the official shaman-priests experts in rites and astronomy of the Shang, and later Zhou, dynasty.

Confucius (551–479 BCE) appeared in this period of political decadence and spiritual questioning. He was educated in Shang-Zhou theology, which he contributed to transmit and reformulate, giving centrality to self-cultivation and human agency, and the educational power of the self-established individual in assisting others to establish themselves (the principle of 愛人; àirén; "loving others"). As the Zhou reign collapsed, traditional values were abandoned, resulting in a period of moral decline. Confucius saw an opportunity to reinforce the values of compassion and tradition in society. Disillusioned with the widespread vulgarisation of the rituals to access Tian, he began to preach an ethical interpretation of traditional Zhou religion. In his view, the power of Tian is immanent and responds positively to a sincere heart driven by humaneness, rightness, decency, and altruism. Confucius conceived these qualities as the foundation needed to restore socio-political harmony. Like many contemporaries, Confucius saw ritual practices as efficacious ways to access Tian, but he thought that the crucial knot was the state of meditation that participants enter prior to engaging in the ritual acts. Confucius amended and recodified the classical books inherited from the Xia-Shang-Zhou dynasties, and composed the Spring and Autumn Annals.

Philosophers in the Warring States period, both "inside the square" (focused on state-endorsed ritual) and "outside the square" (non-aligned to state ritual), built upon Confucius's legacy, compiled in the Analects, and formulated the classical metaphysics that became the lash of Confucianism. In accordance with the Master, they identified mental tranquility as the state of Tian, or the One (一; Yī), which in each individual is the Heaven-bestowed divine power to rule one's own life and the world. Going beyond the Master, they theorised the oneness of production and reabsorption into the cosmic source, and the possibility of understanding and therefore reattaining it through meditation. This line of thought would have influenced all Chinese individual and collective-political mystical theories and practices thereafter.

According to Zhou Youguang, Confucianism's name in Chinese, 儒; rú, originally referred to shamanic methods of holding rites and existed before Confucius' times, but with Confucius, it came to mean devotion to propagating such teachings to bring civilisation to the people. Confucianism was initiated by Confucius, developed by Mencius (c. 372–289 BCE), and inherited by later generations, undergoing constant transformations and restructuring since its inception, while preserving the principles of humaneness and righteousness at its core.

=== Joseon dynasty ===
In the Joseon dynasty in Korea, orthodox Neo-Confucianism differentiated itself from religions and was similar to an "all-embracing belief system with many aspects of a religion".

=== South Korea ===
Confucianism is one of the seven official religions in Korea. Today, South Korea and the Jongmyo Shrine lead religious Confucianism, and in 2026, they held an official Confucian-Catholic dialogue with the Vatican Catholic Church.

== Doctrine ==
=== Tian and the gods ===
Tian refers to the God of Heaven, the northern culmen of the skies and its spinning stars, earthly nature and its laws which come from Heaven, to "Heaven and Earth" (that is, "all things"), and to the awe-inspiring forces beyond human control. There are such a number of uses in Chinese thought that it is not possible to give one translation into English.

Confucius used the term in a mystical way. He wrote in the Analects (7.23) that tiān gave him life, and that tiān watched and judged (6.28; 9.12). In 9.5 Confucius says that a person may know the movements of the tiān, and this provides with the sense of having a special place in the universe. In 17.19 Confucius says that tiān spoke to him, though not in words. The scholar Ronnie Littlejohn warns that tiān was not to be interpreted as personal God comparable to that of the Abrahamic faiths, in the sense of an otherworldly or transcendent creator. Rather it is similar to what Taoists meant by Dao: "the way things are" or "the regularities of the world", which Stephan Feuchtwang equates with the ancient Greek concept of physis, "nature" as the generation and regenerations of things and of the moral order. Tiān may also be compared to the Brahman of Hindu and Vedic traditions. The scholar Promise Hsu, in the wake of Robert B. Louden, explained 17:19 ("What does Tian ever say? Yet there are four seasons going round and there are the hundred things coming into being. What does Tian say?") as implying that even though Tian is not a "speaking person", it constantly "does" through the rhythms of nature, and communicates "how human beings ought to live and act", at least to those who have learnt to carefully listen to it.

Zigong, a disciple of Confucius, said that Tiān had set the master on the path to become a wise man (9.6). In 7.23 Confucius says that he has no doubt left that the Tiān gave him life, and from it he had developed right virtue (德; dé). In 8.19 he says that the lives of the sages are interwoven with Tiān.

Regarding personal gods (shén, energies who emanate from and reproduce the Tiān) enliving nature, in the Analects Confucius says that it is appropriate (义; 義; yì) for people to worship (敬; jìng) them, though through proper rites (礼; 禮; lǐ), implying respect of positions and discretion. Confucius himself was a ritual and sacrificial master.

Answering to a disciple who asked whether it is better to sacrifice to the god of the stove or to the god of the family (a popular saying), in 3.13 Confucius says that to appropriately pray gods one should first know and respect Heaven. In 3.12 he explains that religious rituals produce meaningful experiences, and one has to offer sacrifices in person, acting in presence, otherwise "it is the same as not having sacrificed at all". Rites and sacrifices to the gods have an ethical importance: they generate good life, because taking part in them leads to the overcoming of the self. Analects 10.11 tells that Confucius always took a small part of his food and placed it on the sacrificial bowls as an offering to his ancestors.

Some Confucian movements worship Confucius, although not as a supreme being or anything else approaching the power of tian or the dao, and/or gods from Chinese folk religion. These movements are not a part of mainstream Confucianism, although the boundary between Chinese folk religion and Confucianism can be blurred.

Other movements, such as Mohism which was later absorbed by Taoism, developed a more theistic idea of Heaven. Feuchtwang explains that the difference between Confucianism and Taoism primarily lies in the fact that the former focuses on the realisation of the starry order of Heaven in human society, while the latter on the contemplation of the Dao which spontaneously arises in nature. However, Confucianism does venerate many aspects of nature and also respects various dao, as well as what Confucius saw as the main dao, the "[Way] of Heaven."

The Way of Heaven involves "lifelong and sincere devotion to traditional cultural forms" and wu wei, "a state of spontaneous harmony between individual inclinations and the sacred Way".

Some Confucianists' worship and views of Tiān in the Yuan dynasty as a "silent...and odorless" creator and a being who cannot be summed up or represented by images was similar to how Chinese Muslims in the era worshipped Allah.

=== Shangdi ===
Contemporary Confucian theologians have emphasised differences between the Confucian idea of Shangdi, conceived as both transcendent and immanent, and act only as a governor of the world, and the Christian idea of God, which they conceived contrary to those of Christian as a deity that is completely otherworldly (transcendent) and is merely a creator of the world.

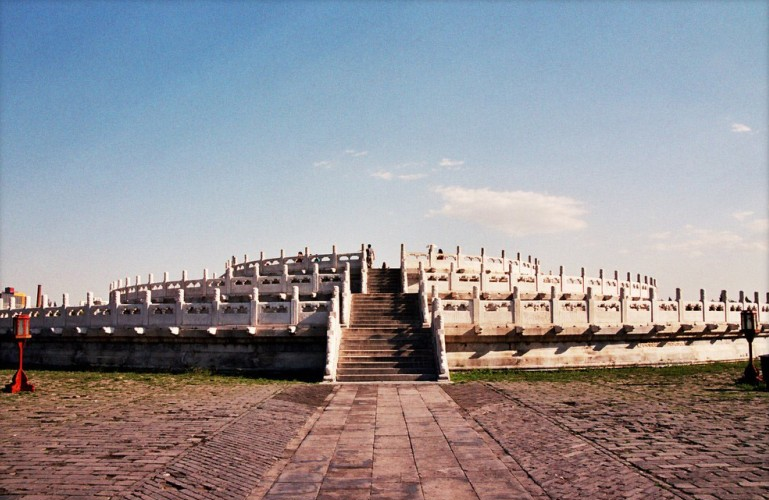
Sacred altar at the Temple of Heaven, Beijing

As mentioned above, sacrifices offered to Shangdi by the king are claimed by traditional Chinese histories to predate the Xia dynasty. The surviving archaeological record shows that by the Shang, the shoulder blades of sacrificed oxen were used to send questions or communication through fire and smoke to the divine realm, a practice known as scapulimancy. The heat would cause the bones to crack and royal diviners would interpret the marks as Shangdi's response to the king. Inscriptions used for divination were buried into special orderly pits, while those that were for practice or records were buried in common middens after use.

Under Shangdi or his later names, the deity received sacrifices from the ruler of China in every Chinese dynasty annually at a great Temple of Heaven in the imperial capital. Following the principles of Chinese geomancy, this would always be located in the southern quarter of the city. (Note: For instance, the Classic of History records the Duke of Zhou building an altar in the southern part of Luo.) During the ritual, a completely healthy bull would be slaughtered and presented as an animal sacrifice to Shangdi. (Note: Although the Duke of Zhou is presented as sacrificing two.) The Book of Rites states the sacrifice should occur on the "longest day" on a round-mound altar. The altar would have three tiers: the highest for Shangdi and the Son of Heaven; the second-highest for the sun and moon; and the lowest for the natural gods such as the stars, clouds, rain, wind, and thunder.

Shangdi is never represented with either images or idols. Instead, in the center building of the Temple of Heaven, in a structure called the "Imperial Vault of Heaven", a "spirit tablet" (神位; shénwèi) inscribed with the name of Shangdi is stored on the throne, Huangtian Shangdi (皇天上帝). During an annual sacrifice, the emperor would carry these tablets to the north part of the Temple of Heaven, a place called the "Prayer Hall For Good Harvests", and place them on that throne.

Shangdi's worship in the Yuan dynasty was similar to how Chinese Muslims in the era worshipped Allah.

== Rites ==
=== Jesa ===
Jesa is a Confucian ceremony of ancestor veneration. It is the Korean pronunciation of the Chinese jisi 祭祀, although in Chinese culture it is not limited to worship of ancestors.

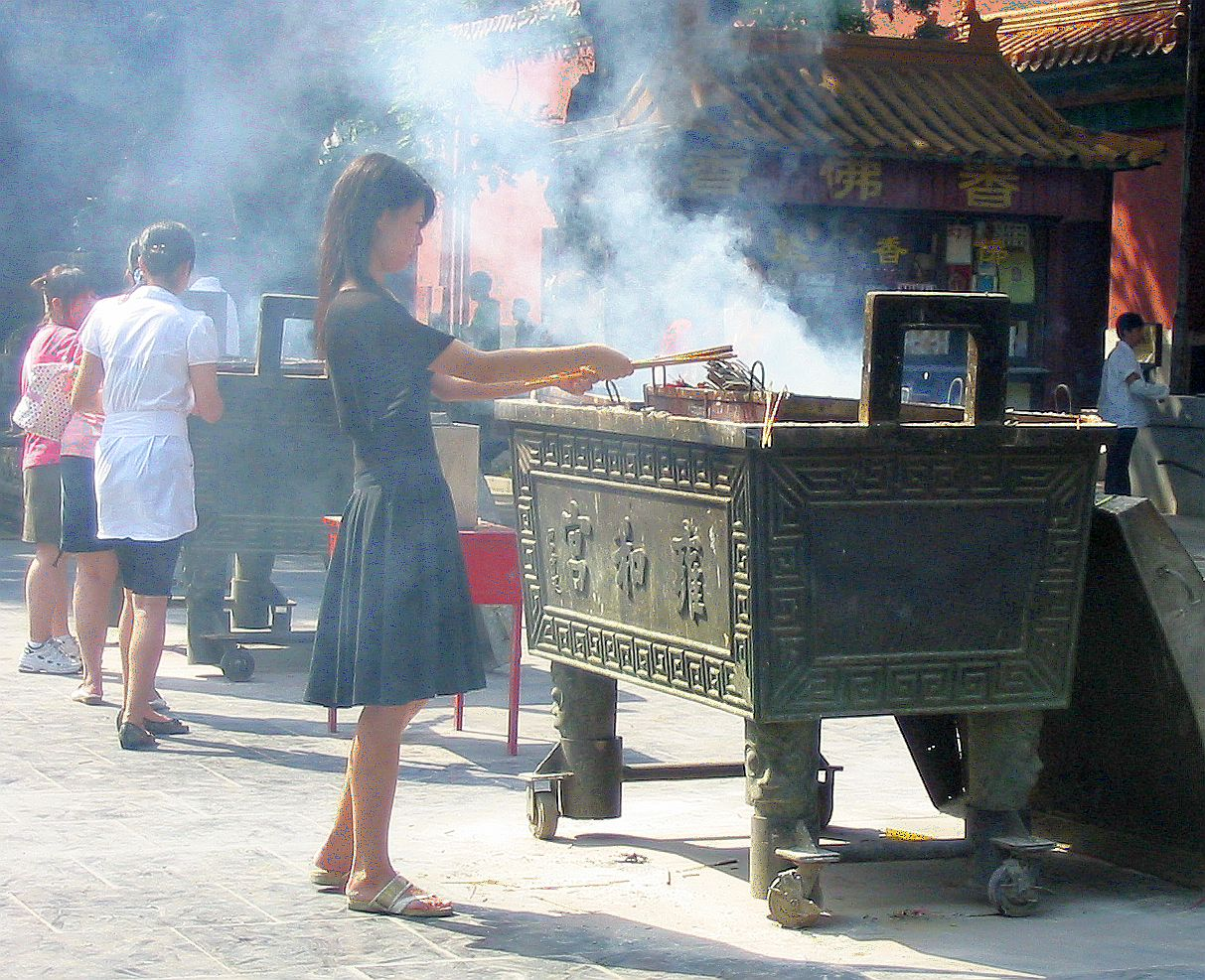
A Chinese woman performing jisi (to a god in a public temple, not an ancestor in the home) in Beijing

=== Sacrifice to Heaven ===
Sacrifice to Heaven is a rite of worship of Shangdi. It was originally limited to the nobility, but over time became accessible to commoners. It has many local variations.

=== Feng Shan ===
Feng Shan is a historically very significant ceremony which is performed irregularly on Mount Tai. Completing Feng Shan allowed the emperor to receive the Mandate of Heaven. It is considered a prerequisite that the empire is in a period of prosperity with a good emperor and auspicious signs to perform the ritual. Many sovereigns refused to perform the ritual citing themselves as unworthy of it.

Unlike sacrifice to heaven, there have been no attempts to replicate this ritual outside of China, but in modern times, a commercialized festival claiming continuity is hosted every year.

=== Ritual Music System ===
The ritual and music system is a historical social system that originated in the Zhou Dynasty to maintain the social order.

The ritual and music System is divided into two parts: ritual and music. The part of ritual mainly divides people's identity and social norms, and finally forms a hierarchy. The music part is mainly based on the hierarchical system of etiquette, using music to alleviate social conflicts.

Confucius was a strong advocate of preserving this system.

== Views on whether Confucianism is a religion ==
=== Sui dynasty views ===
Li Shiqian wrote in the sixth century his opinions on how Confucianism, Taoism, and Buddhism were religious systems that complemented each other.

=== Yuan dynasty views ===
Yang Shouyi, the magistrate of Anxi, viewed Confucianism as a religion that was superior to Taoism and Buddhism in his opinion. Liu Mi, a late Song and early Yuan dynastic elite, stated that Confucianism is 'intended for the governance of the world', distinguishing it from the 'cultivation of mind' (Buddhism) and the 'training of the physical body' (Daoism) in his essay Sanjiao Pingxin Lun.

=== Qing dynasty views ===
The Chinese Rites controversy (中国礼仪之争; 中國禮儀之爭; Zhōngguó Lǐyí Zhī Zhēng) was a dispute among Roman Catholic missionaries over the religiosity of Confucianism and Chinese rituals during the 17th and 18th centuries. The debate discussed whether Chinese ritual practices of honoring family ancestors and other formal Confucian and Chinese imperial rites qualified as religious rites and were thus incompatible with Catholic belief.

The controversy embroiled leading European universities; the Qing dynasty's Kangxi Emperor and several popes (including Clement XI and Clement XIV) considered the case; the offices of the Holy See also intervened. Near the end of the 17th century, many Dominicans and Franciscans had shifted their positions in agreeing with the Jesuits' opinion, but Rome disagreed. Clement XI banned the rites in 1704. In 1742, Benedict XIV reaffirmed the ban and forbade debate.

=== Late Qing dynasty and early Republican era views ===
Cai Yuanpei and Chen Duxiu expanded on Liang's Religious Confucianism theory, denying that Confucianism was a religion, but not denying that Religious Confucianism had existed after Emperor Wu of Han.

=== Civil War to modern era views ===
At the end of 1978, at the founding conference of the Chinese Atheist Society, Ren Jiyu put forward the argument that Confucianism was a religion, and in 1980, Ren published a series of articles formally proposing that "Confucianism is a religion". The first article on Confucianism as a religion was "On the Formation of Confucianism" published in the first issue of Chinese Social Science in 1980, followed by "Confucianism and Confucianism" and other papers. The basis for the Confucianism-is-religion theory is the sacralization of the Confucian classics to establish a Confucian theological system. Theologized Confucianism, which integrates politics, philosophy and ethics into one, forms a vast Confucian system that has always occupied an orthodox position in ideology. The sources of Confucianism are, on the one hand, the theology of providence and the religious idea of ancestor worship during the Yin and Zhou dynasties and, on the other hand, the Confucian doctrine founded by Confucius. The founding of the Doctrine of Science in the Song Dynasty marked the maturity of Confucianism. Confucianism's object of worship is "Heaven and Earth, the ruler and the teacher", and there is a system of deities and rituals for Heaven and Confucius. Its doctrine is the deification and religiousization of the patriarchal system and patriarchal thought. Zhu Xi is very devout to the gods, every major event, to report to Confucius; drought and little rain, to pray to the mountains and rivers and other deities. Zhu Xi's religious feelings, is the typical embodiment of Confucian religious feelings and concentrated representation. The human-god relationship in Confucianism is the expression of the relationship between heaven and man. In Confucianism, heaven is the master of man's fate, and man must submit to the will of heaven. Dong Zhongshu said that heaven has a will, a joy and anger, and can reward good and punish evil. Zhu Xi, based on Dong Zhongshu, rationalized and humanized heaven. It is believed that heaven and moral attributes – the highest good, so that heaven and man a reason, heaven and man through; obedience to the will of God, it is expressed in the compliance with the principles of heaven.

He Guanghu points out that the heaven of Religious Confucianism is the heaven that blesses the people and reprieves sins, and is a supreme god with a will and personality. Lai Yonghai points out that heaven, or God, is the supreme deity of Confucianism, and that the will of heaven is the fundamental starting point for all political and ethical principles of Confucianism. The deity system with God as the supreme deity is the belief system of Religious Confucianism. God was originally the ancestral god of the past. The Confucians of the Song Dynasty described Heaven, Reason, and Emperor (God) as concepts of the same reality and different names, but only changed the concept of God, not the essence of God as the master of the world. Confucius and the best Confucians were worshiped as public gods of the state after their death. Monarchs and Confucians were the rulers and teachers who honored God's command to govern and educate the people. Since the Song Dynasty, Confucians have used philosophical theories of the relationship between reason and qi and the nature of the mind to argue that the teachings of benevolence, righteousness, propriety, wisdom, and the virtues of loyalty, faith, filial piety, and fraternity are the nature given to each person by Heaven, so it is one's duty to observe these principles. Confucianism is essentially the study of the interpretation of the scriptures.

Neo-Confucians like the Cheng brothers conceived of Heaven as the wonderful life-giving activity that transcends the world within the world, making it naturally religious. Other modern Confucians treat the nature of Heaven as a transcendent foundation of moral axiology and political cosmology, representing it as the ultimate ideal in traditional Confucian society; hence, Heaven (Tian) is also treated as the ordered totality of existence itself, the ultimate source of the socio-cosmic order which humanity must align.

On the other hand, some scholars believe that not only Confucianism, but also Confucianism itself, is a human-centered, atheistic religion. The Chinese attach importance to funeral rites, family continuity, filial piety, and returning to one's roots, and respect for ancestors can be considered a habit. Some contemporary Chinese would equate religion with superstition and reject it in word and deed, and thus often do not consider Confucianism as a religion.

Chin-Shing Huang believes that the debate over whether Confucianism is a religion or not in modern times is based on "Christianity" as the basis of religion, and this is how Confucianism is judged. However, this concept differs greatly from traditional religious views, and is different from the three religions of Confucianism, Buddhism, and Taoism that have existed since the Eastern Han Dynasty and could become independent religious entities. The report of the Taiwan Old Practices Survey published in 1910 positioned Confucianism as a religion, stating, "Confucianism is the ancient doctrine of the saints and kings as ancestrally described by Confucius and Mencius, which includes religion, morality and politics, and the three are integrated into a large religious system.

Taiwan Private Law, citing the Journal of Taiwan Prefecture, lists the Jade Emperor, the Dongyue Emperor, Beiji Dadi, Mazu, Wugu Xiandi, Baosheng Dadi, the Lords of the Three Mountains, Shuixian Zunwang, Tan Goan-kong, Guang Ze Zun Wang, Zhu Sae, Chen Jinggu, Emperor Huaguang, miao, the spirits of righteous people, city gods, Tudigong, the Kitchen God, Wenchang Wang and Kui Xing as gods all belonging to various traditions of Religious Confucianism. Later, Fukutaro Masuda argued that the religion of the Taiwanese is "a large folk religion that is a mixture of Taoism, Confucianism, and Buddhism," faithfully reflecting traditional religious concepts. Kataoka's book "Taiwan Folklore" also inherited this religious view and expanded the scope of Religious Confucianism during the Japanese rule. Religious Confucianism was not limited to folk beliefs during the Japanese rule period. In 1941, the entry of "Huang Chunqing" in the "Public Records of Personnel": Huang Chunqing's religion was "Religious Confucianism". Confucianism". Both Huang Chunqing and Wei Qingde crossed over from the Japanese rule period to the postwar period, and their religious beliefs were both positioned as Religious Confucianism. In 1918, Religious Confucianism was listed as the top of "Religion" in the "Journal of the Native Land" compiled by the Bajiran Public School (now Shihlin Elementary School).

Mou Zongsan views Confucianism as an 'atheistic religion' belonging to the rational transcendent discourse of religion based on his interpretation of Kant's "thing-in-itself". He reasoned that Confucianism's theological system uses immanent theology as an essential framework for explaining the religiousness found in the Confucian principle of 'conformity of Heaven and man in union'.

==== Other (non-Chinese) views on Confucianism ====
The OER Project views Confucianism as a religion. In a book vetted by Bill Gates and other OER Project members called Big History, its authors defend this stance by discussing how Confucianists historically tried to proselytize to others and also fought wars to enforce the belief system on others and enforce specific versions of it.

Yuval Noah Harari also views the belief system as a religion, although one that venerates nature and Confucianists' view on rationality and what the natural order is instead of what he considers as a religion that revolves around a deity or deities, such as Christianity and some branches of Hinduism. He also classes movements like communism and humanism as religions by the same definition to make a point, which has been criticized.

Kelly James Clark argued that Confucius himself saw Tiān as an anthropomorphic god in a religious manner that Clark hypothetically refers to as "Heavenly Supreme Emperor", although most other scholars on Confucianism disagree with this view.

Georg Wilhelm Friedrich Hegel notes that Confucianism is a natural religion of magic where the Emperor acts as the 'supreme magician'.

== Confucian Churches ==
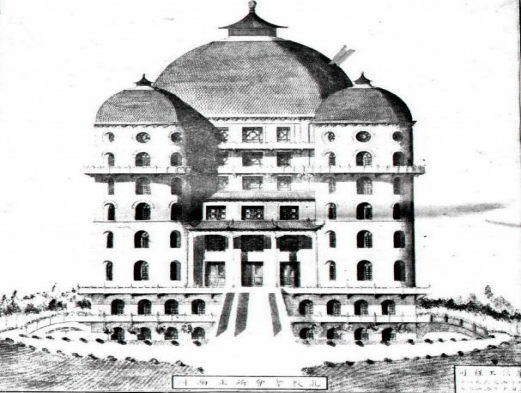
Project for the Confucian Church Headquarters (孔教总会堂) in Beijing, next to the Confucian University. The Confucian University was opened in 1923, but the main church was never completed.

The Confucian church (Chinese: 孔教会; pinyin: Kǒng jiàohuì or 儒教会; Rú jiàohuì) is a Confucian religious and social institution of the congregational type. It was first proposed by Kang Youwei (1858–1927) near the end of the 19th century, as a state religion of Qing China following a European model.

Since the early years of the Republic of China, Kang Youwei's Confucian movement advocated the separation of Religious Confucianism from the state bureaucracy, allowing everyone to sacrifice to Heaven in a way inspired by Christianity.

The "Confucian church" model was later replicated by overseas Chinese communities, who established independent Confucian churches active at the local level, especially in Indonesia and the United States.

There has been a revival of Confucianism in contemporary China since around 2000, which has triggered the proliferation of Confucian academies (书院; shūyuàn); the opening and reopening of temples of Confucius; the new phenomenon of grassroots Confucian communities or congregations (社区儒学; shèqū rúxué); and renewed talks about a national "Confucian church".

Numerous sects of Chinese salvationist religions and movements such as Falun Gong have incorporated aspects of religious Confucianism. In addition, sects of Japanese Sect Shinto such as Shintō Taiseikyō and Shinto Susei practice Confucian Shinto.

=== Indonesian Confucian Church ===
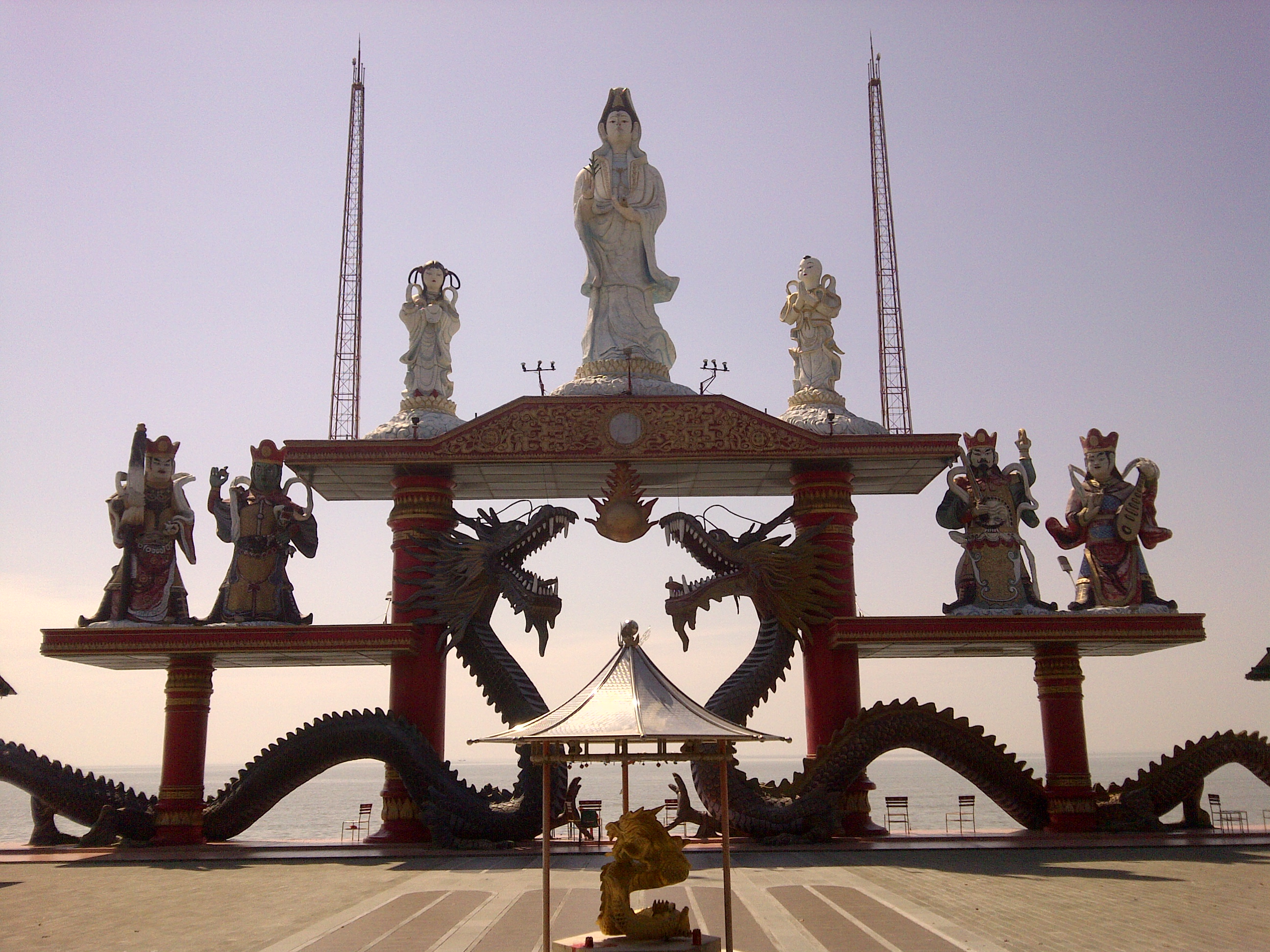
A Chinese temple of Sanggar Agung, in Surabaya, East Java

Confucianism originated in China and was brought to Indonesia by Chinese merchants as early as the 3rd century AD. Unlike other religions, Confucianism evolved more into loose individual practices and belief in the code of conduct, rather than a well-organised community with a sound theology—akin to a way of life or social movement than a religion. It was not until the early 1900s that Confucianists formed an organisation, called Khong Kauw Hwe (THHK) in Batavia.

The development of the Confucian Church in Indonesia began in 1900, when the Chinese Association was established, with Pan Jinghe and Chen Jinshan as president and secretary, respectively; the leader of the Chinese Association, Lie Kim Hok, wrote an article entitled "Chinese in 1923, representatives of Confucian churches from all over the world held the first national congress in Java, Surakarta in Central Java, where it was unanimously agreed to establish the Confucian General Assembly, based in Bandung, which was later formally It was later formally established in 1924, and elected Zhang Zhenyi and Hu Yingkong as the president and secretary of the General Council. After the Japanese invasion of Indonesia, the Confucian Church was considered to be against Japan and all its activities were frozen.

After the Indonesian independence in 1945, Confucianism was affected by several political conflicts. In 1965, Sukarno issued Presidential Decree No. 1/Pn.Ps/1965, recognising that six religions are embraced by the Indonesian people, including Confucianism. In 1961, the Association of Khung Chiao Hui Indonesia (PKCHI) (now the Supreme Council for the Confucian Religion in Indonesia) had declared that Confucianism is a religion and Confucius is their prophet.

During the New Order, the anti-China policy became a scapegoat-like method to gain political support from the masses, especially after the fall of PKI, which had allegedly been backed by China. In 1967, Suharto issued controversial Presidential Instruction No. 14/1967, which effectively banned Chinese culture, including documents printed in Chinese, expressions of Chinese belief, Chinese celebrations and festivities, and even Chinese names. However, Suharto acknowledged that the Chinese Indonesians had a large amount of wealth and power, despite consisting only 3% of the population.

In 1969, Statute No. 5/1969 was passed, restoring the official total of six religions. However, it was not always put into practice. In 1978, the Minister of Home Affairs issued a directive asserting there are only five religions, excluding Confucianism. On 27 January 1979, a presidential cabinet meeting decided that Confucianism is not a religion. Another Minister of Home Affairs directive in 1990 re-iterated the total of five official religions in Indonesia. Therefore, the status of Confucianism during the New Order regime was never clear. De jure, there were conflicting laws, because higher laws permitted Confucianism, but lower ones did not recognise it. De facto, Confucianists were not recognised by the government, and they were forced to register with one of the original five official religions to maintain their citizenship. This practice was applied in many places, including the national registration card, marriage registration, and family registration card. Civics education in Indonesia taught school children that there are only five official religions.

Following the fall of Suharto in 1998, Abdurrahman Wahid was elected as the country's fourth president. He rescinded the 1967 Presidential Instruction and the 1978 Home Affairs Ministry directive, and Confucianism once again became officially recognised as a religion in Indonesia. Chinese culture and activities were again permitted.

At present, the General Confucian Church of Indonesia (MAKIN) has about 200 branches throughout Indonesia. Confucian churches organize their members to engage in religious prayers, singing hymns and studying scriptures on a regular basis mainly in auditoriums, and also carry out activities such as traditional Chinese festivals, Confucian rituals on Christmas Day (i.e. Confucius' Birthday or Confucius' Christmas Day), family support, children's education, civil marriages and weddings for couples, funeral ceremonies held for the deceased elderly, charity and disaster relief. The Confucian Church publishes various Confucian classics as well as books such as "Stories of the Sacred Signs of Confucius", "Confucian Hymns", "Liturgy Manual", "Chinese Culture", etc. It also produces various paraphernalia and souvenirs such as hymn discs, dragon and qilin patterns. Since the Chinese language was banned for decades, the books currently published are almost exclusively in Indonesian, and Confucians hope that their children will learn Chinese and read the original scriptures and materials. Indonesian Confucians see Qufu as a "holy place" and hope to visit it at least once in their lifetime.

== See also ==
- Confucius Institute
- Shendao

== Bibliography ==
- 陈勇 (2012). 作为宗教的儒学：争论与影响. Brill. ISBN 978-90-04-24373-6. Archived from the original on 8 April 2022.
- Adler, Joseph A. (2014), Confucianism as a Religious Tradition: Linguistic and Methodological Problems (PDF), Gambier, OH: Kenyon College.
- William Theodore De Bary (1989). Neo-Confucian Education: The Formative Stage. University of California Press. pp. 455–. ISBN 978-0-520-06393-8.
- Billioud, Sébastien; Thoraval, Joël (2015). The Sage and the People: The Confucian Revival in China. Oxford University Press. ISBN 978-0-19-025814-6.
- Billioud, Sébastien (2010). "Carrying the Confucian Torch to the Masses: The Challenge of Structuring the Confucian Revival in the People's Republic of China" (PDF). OE. 49.
- Clart, Philip (2003). "Confucius and the Mediums: Is There a "Popular Confucianism"?" (PDF). T'oung Pao. LXXXIX.
- Chen, Yong (2012). Confucianism as Religion: Controversies and Consequences. Brill. ISBN 978-90-04-24373-6.
- Creel, Herrlee (1949). Confucius and the Chinese Way. New York: Harper Torchbooks.
- John W. Dardess (1983). Confucianism and Autocracy: Professional Elites in the Founding of the Ming Dynasty. University of California Press. ISBN 978-0-520-04733-4.
- Didier, John C. (2009). "In and Outside the Square: The Sky and the Power of Belief in Ancient China and the World, c. 4500 BC – AD 200". Sino-Platonic Papers (192). Volume I: The Ancient Eurasian World and the Celestial Pivot, Volume II: Representations and Identities of High Powers in Neolithic and Bronze China, Volume III: Terrestrial and Celestial Transformations in Zhou and Early-Imperial China.
- Elman, Benjamin A. (2005), On Their Own Terms: Science in China, 1550–1900, Harvard University Press, ISBN 978-0-674-01685-9.
- Fan, Lizhu; Chen, Na (2015). "The Religiousness of "Confucianism" and the Revival of Confucian Religion in China Today". Cultural Diversity in China. 1 (1): 27–43. doi:10.1515/cdc-2015-0005. ISSN 2353-7795.
- Fan, Lizhu; Chen, Na (2015a), "Revival of Confucianism and Reconstruction of Chinese Identity", The Presence and Future of Humanity in the Cosmos, Tokyo: ICU.
- Feuchtwang, Stephan (2016), "Chinese religions", in Woodhead, Linda; Kawanami, Hiroko; Partridge, Christopher H. (eds.), Religions in the Modern World: Traditions and Transformations (3nd ed.), London: Routledge, pp. 143–172, ISBN 978-1-317-43960-8.
- Fingarette, Herbert (1972). Confucius: The Secular as Sacred. New York: Harper. ISBN 978-1-4786-0866-0.
- Fung, Yiu-ming (2008), "Problematizing Contemporary Confucianism in East Asia", in Richey, Jeffrey (ed.), Teaching Confucianism, Oxford University Press, ISBN 978-0-19-804256-3.
- Gunn, Geoffrey C. (2003), First Globalization: The Eurasian Exchange, 1500 to 1800, Rowman & Littlefield, ISBN 978-0-7425-2662-4.
- Haynes, Jeffrey (2008), Routledge Handbook of Religion and Politics, Taylor & Francis, ISBN 978-0-415-41455-5.
- Ivanhoe, Philip J. (2000). Confucian Moral Self Cultivation (2nd rev. ed.). Indianapolis: Hackett Publishing. ISBN 978-0-87220-508-6.
- Li-Hsiang, Lisa Rosenlee (2012). Confucianism and Women: A Philosophical Interpretation. SUNY Press. pp. 164–. ISBN 978-0-7914-8179-0.
- Libbrecht, Ulrich (2007). Within the Four Seas...: Introduction to Comparative Philosophy. Peeters Publishers. ISBN 978-90-429-1812-2.
- Littlejohn, Ronnie (2010), Confucianism: An Introduction, I.B. Tauris, ISBN 978-1-84885-174-0.
- Nivison, David S. (1996). The Ways of Confucianism: Investigations in Chinese Philosophy. Chicago: Open Court Press. ISBN 978-0-8126-9340-9.
- Payette, Alex. "Shenzhen's Kongshengtang: Religious Confucianism and Local Moral Governance" (PDF). International Political Science Association. Archived from the original (PDF) on 23 October 2017..
- Pankenier, David W. (2013). Astrology and Cosmology in Early China. Cambridge University Press. ISBN 978-1-107-00672-0.
- Richey, Jeffrey, ed. (2008), "Problematizing Contemporary Confucianism in East Asia", Teaching Confucianism, Oxford University Press, ISBN 978-0-19-804256-3, archived from the original on 15 April 2021.
- Shen, Qingsong; Shun, Kwong-loi (2007), Confucian Ethics in Retrospect and Prospect, Council for Research in Values and philosophy, ISBN 978-1-56518-245-5.
- Sinaiko, Herman L. (1998), Reclaiming the Canon: Essays on Philosophy, Poetry, and History, Yale University Press, ISBN 978-0-300-06529-9.
- Tay, Wei Leong (2010). "Kang Youwei: The Martin Luther of Confucianism and His Vision of Confucian Modernity and Nation" (PDF). Secularization, Religion and the State.
- Yang, C.K. (1961). Religion in Chinese Society; a Study of Contemporary Social Functions of Religion and Some of Their Historical Factors. Berkeley: University of California Press. ISBN 978-0-520-01371-1.
- Yao, Xinzhong (2000). An Introduction to Confucianism. Cambridge University Press. ISBN 978-0-521-64312-2.
- Zhou, Youguang (2012). "To Inherit the Ancient Teachings of Confucius and Mencius and Establish Modern Confucianism" (PDF). Sino-Platonic Papers (226).

Articles

- Hsu, Promise (16 November 2014). "The Civil Theology of Confucius' "Tian" Symbol". Voegelin View. Archived from the original on 24 December 2019.
