= Confucian ritual religion =

Definition of the civil religion of China

Confucian ritual religion (s 礼教, t 禮教 Lǐjiào, "rites' transmission", also called 名教 Míngjiào, the "names' transmission"), or the Confucian civil religion, defines the civil religion of China. It consists of the state-endorsed ceremonies and sacrifices (cults), held according to Confucian modalities, dedicated to the Gods which represent the theologico-political origin of the state itself and the Chinese civilisation. These rituals have undergone a great revitalisation in post-Maoist China, creating a public space in which the Chinese state and popular Confucian movements jostle and negotiate with each other.

Worship of cosmological gods and of Confucius, is carried out regularly at consecrated public spaces.

== See also ==
- American civil religion
- Chinese folk religion
- Confucianism
- Shendao
- Confucian Academy
- Supreme Council for the Confucian Religion in Indonesia
- Holy Confucian Church
- Religion in China
- State religion & Civil religion
- Religious Confucianism
