= Lai (surname) =

Lai (賴)
- Pronunciation: Lài (Mandarin); Lai, Lye (Hakka, Cantonese); Lua, Nua, Nai, Loa, Lok (MinnanHokkien); Lại (Vietnamese)
- Language: Chinese

Origin
- Language: Middle Chinese
- Derivation: Lai (state 賴) (賴子国)
- Meaning: depend on; trust in; rely on"

Other names
- Derivatives: Luo (羅), Fu (傅)

Lai (traditional Chinese: 賴; simplified Chinese: 赖; pinyin: Lài) is a common Chinese surname that is pronounced similarly in both Mandarin, Hakka dialect and also in the Vietnamese language. The meaning of the character used in the Lai (賴) surname is "depend on; trust in; rely on".

It is also a Hokkien (Southern Fujian)/ Minnan (Southern Min) surname that is romanized as Lua, Nai or Nua. In Malaysia, Singapore, Philippines and other parts of Southeast Asia there are Lai migrants from southern Fujian Province who are usually surnamed Lua/ Luah, Loa (romanized from Hokkien / Minnan in Southern Min dialect) or Lye (romanized from Hakka dialect) for the Hakka dialect groups. In Sri Lanka, Lye is a common surname among Sri Lankan Malays of Peranakan Chinese descent.

In Indonesia, most of the Indonesians of Chinese descent changed their surname to an Indonesian surname to comply with 'Cabinet Presidium Decision 127 of 1966' laws during President Suharto's despotic rule. However, they usually change to surnames with the same sound, contains a part of the original surname or totally different sound, hence the Indonesian Lai surname has evolved into Sasmita, Laya, Lais, Lasuki, Irawan,Lohananta etc.

During the Japanese occupation of Taiwan (1895 -1945), the Lai clan in Taiwan was forced to adopt Japanese surnames such as Segawa and Kiyose etc. After the war, the surname was reverted back to Lai.

== Origins ==
The Lais' ancestry were from the State of Lai (賴国) or Viscounty of Lai (賴子国) at the beginning of the ancient Zhou Dynasty (1046 BC). Initially the capital was based at Yuzhou City , Henan Province, and later moved to Baoxin Town , Xixian County, Henan Province. The Lai Clan Ancestral Hall was built in the Ancient Lai State Cultural Park (古赖国文化园), Baoxin Town in 2013.

Viscount Shu Ying (叔穎公) or Ji Ying (姬颖) was the 19th son of Ji Chang,(Posthumously known as King Wen of Zhou) who was patriarch of the Zhou clan. On the establishment of the Zhou Dynasty, Viscount Shu Ying, (叔穎公) was conferred the heritable title of Viscount (子爵) by Ji Fa or King Wu of Zhou (his 2nd elder brother who became the 1st King of the Zhou Dynasty) to rule over a territory which is approximately in the northeast of the present day Baoxin town (包信鎮) in Xi Xian (息縣) of Henan province. Viscount Shu Ying named his domain the State of Lai (賴国), hence he was also known as Lai Shu Ying (賴叔穎). The State of Lai thrive mainly in agriculture and handicrafts ( pottery and bronze).

Viscount Shu Ying and his succeeding descendants continued to rule the State / Viscounty of Lai (賴子国) until the year 538 B.C for a total of 14 generations when it was conquered by King Ling of Chu (reign 540–529 BC). The last ruler was Viscount Tian (賴添公).

Many Lais were dispersed to the south during their defeat by the Chu state; some changed their surname to escape persecution. As in the case of those who fled to the neighboring states of Luo (羅) and Fu (傅), some adopted the Luo (or Loh) or Fu (or Poh, Po) surname. (Because of this, the Lai, the Fu and the Luo are closely related).

Others migrated north and settled in Da Yan (Yanling County, Henan). Most of them adopted the surname Lai (賴) to commemorate their old state.

During the pre-Qin dynasty period, the Lai surname was mainly active in southern Henan and northern Hubei. The Lai surname had already spread to various parts of Jiangnan ( south of the lower reaches of the Yangtze River) in the Qin, Han and Jin dynasties period.

During the Song dynasty, the Lai surname population was sparse, mainly concentrated in Fujian. In the Ming dynasty era, there were approximately 130,000 people with the Lai surname, mainly concentrated in Jiangxi and Guangdong provinces, and secondarily distributed in Fujian and Sichuan.

In the late Ming and early Qing dynasties, the Lai clan started to expand into the Taiwan Province.

In Vietnam, it was recorded that Lai Tien (賴天) from Jiangzhou (江州), Guangxi was appointed Governor of "Giao Chi district", Eastern Han Dynasty, at the end of the 2nd century. The Vietnamese Lai clan consider Lai Tien (賴天) as the Vietnam's Lai Clan Ancestor. Dong village, Ha Duong commune (now Yen Duong commune), Ha Trung district, Thanh Hoa province is recognized as their sacred ancestral land.

== Statistics ==
Earlier records in the Song Dynasty version of the "Hundred Family Surnames", the Lai(賴) Surname ranks 276th.

According to the 2013 Survey by the Fuxi Institution of the 400 most common surnames in China, Lai is the 95th most common surname however in the latest official survey in done in 2019 (published 2020) shows that the Lai Surname in mainland China now ranks at 106th. ref -List of common Chinese surnames

The majority of the population is concentrated in Guangdong province followed by Fujian, Sichuan, Jiangxi, Taiwan and to a lesser extent in neighboring provinces. There are very few Lai clansmen in the North of mainland China.

Internationally the largest Lai (賴) clans outside of mainland China are found in Vietnam, Malaysia, Singapore, Philippines and Indonesia. Majority of the overseas Lai (賴) clans are of the Hakka dialect group followed by the Hokkien/Minnan dialect.

The total Lai (賴) population is approximately 0.18% or around 2.4 million people in mainland China (Fuxi Institution -2013). In the Republic of China (Taiwan) according to official data in 2018, the surname Lai (賴) is ranked 19th most populous with a total of 311,106 people .

== Notable people surnamed Lai (賴) ==
=== Politicians and public officeholders ===
- Lai Xian, (赖先) Served as Grand Marshal and Prefect of Jiaozhi Commandery during the reign of Emperor Gaozu of Han .
- Lai Tien (賴天), Governor of "Giao Chi district" (now in North Vietnam), Eastern Han Dynasty. Founder of the Lai Clan of Vietnam
- Lai Gong, (賴恭) A general and Grand Master of Ceremonies of Liu Bei, Emperor of the Shu Han State during the Three Kingdoms period (AD 220 to 280).
- Lai Buyi, (赖布衣) An Imperial Preceptor of Emperor Huizhong of the Northern Song Dynasty. Passed the imperial examination at the age of nine. Renown for his Geomancy and Feng Shui.
- Lai Xian, (赖先) a Ming dynasty official in the Ministry of Revenue. From Yongding, Fujian. Courtesy name was Boqi. Revamp the taxations systems for ships.
- Lại Kim Bảng (賴金邦) Censorate Supervisor in 1518 during the early Le Dynasty.(Vietnam)
- Lại Thế Khanh , ((賴世卿, ? - 1578). A great mandarin who contributed to the restoration of the Le dynasty during the Le-Mac war in Vietnamese history .
- Loa Sek Hie,(賴錫禧) Indon-Chinese colonial politician, parliamentarian and founding Voorzitter or chairman of the Indon ethnic-Chinese self-defense force Pao An Tui (1946–1949). Campaigned against racial discrimination and fought for better healthcare and education for ethnic Chinese in the Dutch East Indies. (Indonesia)
- Lai Jifa, (赖际发) Minister of Building Materials Industry, PRC from 1956 to 1958 and 1965 to 1970.
- Lai Ruoyu,(赖若愚) Governor of Shanxi province, China from 1951 to 1952. From Wutai County, Shanxi Province
- Lại Văn Cử , (賴文居) Minister and Head of the Government Office (Prime Minister) of Vietnam from November 6, 1996 - March 15, 1999.
- Lai In-jaw,(賴英照) President of the Judicial Yuan and Chief Justice of the Constitutional Court of Taiwan (2007–2010)
- Lai Shin-yuan, (賴幸媛) Minister of Mainland Affairs Council of Taiwan (2008–2012)
- Rai Hau-min, (賴浩敏) President of Judicial Yuan of Taiwan (2010–2016)
- William Lai, President of the Republic of China (Taiwan).
- Lai Siu Chiu (賴秀珠) : First woman to serve as a Judicial Commissioner and as a judge on the Supreme Court of Singapore .
- Lai Minhua, Former Commissioner of Macau Customs
- Lai Feng-wei, Magistrate-elect of Penghu County

=== Military ===
- Lai Richen (赖日臣), a Qing Dynasty general. Originally named Taifeng, From Ninghua, Fujian. In 1836, when Japanese pirates attacked Tainan Town on Taiwan island, he led his troops in a counterattack, achieving resounding victories, capturing many enemy leaders, and causing the remaining Japanese pirates to flee.
- Lai Enjue (赖恩爵): Qing dynasty General and Admiral of the Guangdong Navy. Fought the British in the Battle of Kowloon during the First Opium War of 1839. Appointed as the Admiral (水师提督) of the Guangdong Navy in 1843.
- Lai Hanying (赖汉英) : prominent military leader of the Taiping Heavenly Kingdom. Brother-in-law of Hong Xiuquan, the leader of the Taiping Rebellion and elder brother of Lai Wenguang
- Lai Wenguang (賴文光) : prominent military leader of the Taiping Heavenly Kingdom and Nian Rebellion. Brother-in-law of Hong Xiuquan, the leader of the Taiping Rebellion.
- Lai Yi (赖毅) Originally named Lai Yusheng (赖玉生). Founding Lieutenant General of the People's Republic of China and Senior General of the Chinese People's Liberation Army.
- Lai Chuanzhu (赖传珠): Highly decorated Veteran of the Second Sino-Japanese War (1936–1945) and the Chinese Civil War. He was also the General in charge of Landing Operation on Hainan Island together with General Deng Hua.
- Lai Guangxun (赖光勋) : Major General - Veteran of the Long March, War of Resistance Against Japan and Korean War. From Lifang Village, Xianshi Town, Yongding District
- Lai Chunfeng (赖春风) : Major General - Chief of staff of the 54th Army in the Korean War. From Ninggang County, Jiangxi Province.
- Lai Ming Tang (賴名湯) : courtesy name Xiao'an, native of Shicheng County, Jiangxi Province, China. Participated in the Second Sino-Japanese War. Promoted to First-Class General of the Republic of China. Chief of the General Staff of the Republic of China (Taiwan) 1970–1976.

=== Academics, Literary and Arts ===
- Loa Ho (賴和) (1894–1943): Republic of China, Taiwan Province. Poet, medical doctor and anti-Japanese Occupation political activist, hailed as the "Father of Modern Taiwanese Literature"
- Lai Qifang (赖其芳)- Prominent Glass and Ceramics scientist. First to use beryllium in glass manufacturing and systematically studied the properties of beryllium oxide in sodium glass and potassium glass, opening up new fields for the development of new glass varieties and glass science. From Wuping, Fujian
- Michael M. C. Lai (賴明詔) : Republic of China (Taiwan). Virologist, acknowledged as "father of coronavirus research"
- Robert Lai (賴義雄) : Republic of China (Taiwan). Ballistic missile and nuclear submarine research.
- Lai Kui Fang (賴桂芳) : (Malaysian born) Singaporean artist. Winner of 1st Gold medal from "Salon des Artistes Francais", Conferred the Knight of the French Order of Arts & Letters and was preferred to Officer of Arts (the highest honour bestowed by the French government to distinguished masters of the arts).
- Pinky Lai (賴平): Hong Kong, China. Automobile designer and Chief designer with Porsche AG.
- Thế Hiển or Lại Thế Hiển (赖世贤). Vietnamese musician, composer awarded the title of Outstanding Artist in 2012 and People's Artist in 2023 by the Government of Vietnam.
- Thanhha Lai (赖清河). Vietnamese-American writer of children's literature. Winner of 2011 National Book Award for Young People's Literature and a Newbery Honor
- Lai Yonghai (赖永海): Chinese philosopher of religion
- Jessica Lai, New Zealand professor of law

=== Sports ===
- Lai Caiqin (赖彩勤, born 1966), Chinese badminton player. Gold medalist - World Cup (1990, women doubles), Uber Cup (1990, women team) and Asian Games (1990, women team)
- Lai Xiaoxiao, (赖晓晓) Chinese Wushu Gold medal winner in World Traditional Championships, World Championships, World Games, World Cup and Asian Games.
- Shevon Jemie Lai, (赖洁敏). Malaysian professional badminton player, Gold medalist : Mixed Team Event - World Junior Championships (2011) and Asia Junior Championships (2009)
- Lai Pei Jing, (赖沛君) Malaysian professional badminton player, Gold medalist : Mixed team event - Glasgow Commonwealth Games (2014) and Asian Junior Championships (2009)
- Lại Lý Huynh (赖丽黄), Vietnamese Xiangqi (Chinese Chess) grandmaster. 2022 World Rapid Xiangqi Champion. 2025 World Xiangqi Champion.
- Lai Yawen, (赖亚文) : Volleyball - in the team that won Silver medals in 1996 Olympic, World Championships and World Cup (FIVB). Gold medals in the Asian Games and Asian Women's Volleyball Championship.
- Lai Runming, (赖润明) : Chinese weightlifter, 1984 Olympic Games silver medalist in Men's 56kg

=== Entertainment ===
- Donnie Chun-Yu Lai, (賴俊羽). Film Director, winner of Golden Horse Awards for Best Visual Effects in 2007
- Stan Lai: Playwright and theater director
- Lai Pi-hsia (賴碧霞) : Famous musician known for performing Hakka hill songs
- Lai Kuan-lin: Taiwanese singer and actor, former member of disbanded group WANNA ONE
- Lai Meiyun: Chinese singer, S.I.N.G and Rocket Girls 101 member
- Lai Pin-yu: Taiwanese cosplayer
- Leon Lai: Hong Kong singer, performer, entertainer, and creator

=== Other fields ===
- David Jung-Hsin Lai (賴榮信): Bishop of the Episcopal Diocese of Republic of China (Taiwan)
- Lai Ning (赖宁): teenager celebrated as a martyr after his death fighting a wildfire in China

== See also ==
- Lí (黎) (surname) – in Hong Kong, the Chinese surname 黎 is romanized as Lai which is a different surname.
