= Li Tang =

Li Tang may refer to:

- Li Tang (painter) (1050–1130), Chinese landscape painter in the Song dynasty
- Li Tang (hall of worship), place to perform religious rituals and to learn the teachings of Confucius
- Tang dynasty (618–907), an imperial dynasty of China
