= Supreme Council for the Confucian Religion in Indonesia =

Confucian church established in 1955 in Indonesia

Zhong Shu, the logo of the church.

The Supreme Council for the Confucian Religion in Indonesia (Indonesian: Majelis Tinggi Agama Konghucu Indonesia, MATAKIN; Chinese: 印尼孔教總會; pinyin: yìnní kǒngjiào zǒnghuì) is a Confucian church established in 1955 in Indonesia, comprising the communities of practitioners of Confucianism mostly among Chinese Indonesians. Together with the Hong Kong Confucian Academy it is one of the two branches that formed after the dissolution of mainland China's Confucian Church founded by Kang Youwei in the early 20th century.

Confucianism in Indonesia by ethnic groups (2010)
1. Chinese (81.4%)
2. Sundanese (4.20%)
3. Javanese (2.47%)
4. Betawi (1.56%)
5. Malay (1.08%)
6. Others (9.29%)

== Official statistics ==
Confucians in each regency of Indonesia

As of the 2022 Indonesian census, there were 74,899 Confucians in Indonesia, consisting of 0.03% of the population.

Province (2022 census)	Total population	# of Confucians
Indonesia	277,749,673	74,899
Aceh	5,253,512	0
North Sumatra	15,372,437	766
West Sumatra	5,664,988	6
Riau	6,743,099	2,177
Jambi	3,696,044	741
South Sumatra	8,755,074	162
Bengkulu	2,065,573	9
Lampung	8,947,458	132
Bangka Belitung Islands	1,490,418	29,738
Riau Islands	2,133,491	3,249
DKI Jakarta	11,317,271	1,775
West Java	49,339,490	12,198
Central Java	37,783,666	1,344
D.I. Yogyakarta	3,693,834	65
East Java	41,311,181	2,029
Banten	12,321,660	2,371
Bali	4,304,574	580
West Nusa Tenggara	5,534,583	46
East Nusa Tenggara	5,543,239	20
West Kalimantan	4,281,878	15,809
Central Kalimantan	2,706,950	193
South Kalimantan	4,178,229	184
East Kalimantan	3,941,766	355
North Kalimantan	726,989	150
North Sulawesi	2,666,821	430
Central Sulawesi	3,099,717	23
South Sulawesi	9,300,745	70
Southeast Sulawesi	2,707,061	9
Gorontalo	1,215,387	3
West Sulawesi	1,450,610	6
Maluku	1,893,324	59
North Maluku	1,346,267	123
West Papua	559,361	4
Papua	1,073,354	7
Central Papua	1,348,463	42
Highland Papua	1,459,544	4
South Papua	522,844	2
Southwest Papua	604,698	18

== History ==
- In 1883, Boen Tjhiang Soe (Wen Chang Ci 文昌祠), after being rebuilt in 1906, became the Boen Bio (Wen Miao 文廟 or Kong Miao 孔廟, "Temple of Culture" or "Temple of Confucius") at Jl. Kapasan No. 131 Surabaya. The colonial Dutch called it Geredja Boen Bio or Geredja Khonghoetjoe, "Church of Confucius" (de Kerk van Confucius). At the present time it is a place of worship for Confucians in Surabaya.
- In 1886, the first book of Confucius History in Indonesian, was published by Lie Kim Hok.
- In 1897, the Four Books were translated in Indonesian by Njio Tjoen Ean and were published in Ambon.
- In 1900, the translation and commentary of Great Learning (Id: Ajaran Besar) and Doctrine of the Mean (Id: Tengah Sempurna) were completed by Tan Ging Tiong.
- On March 17, 1900, led by the social activist Phoa Keng Hek Sia, twenty Chinese-Indonesian community leaders established Tiong Hoa Hwee Koan, a Confucianist social and educational organisation. It aimed to better the educational and social position of ethnic Chinese in the Dutch East Indies, and reform the practice of Confucianism in the Dutch colony.
- In 1918, the Confucian Council of Solo (Khong Kauw Hwee 孔教會) was legally founded.
- In 1923, a congress was held at Yogyakarta, Central Java, which established the Khong Kauw Tjong Hwee (孔教總會), the Central Assembly of Confucianism.
- On April 16, 1955, it was renamed the Supreme Council for the Confucian Religion in Indonesia; Majelis Tinggi Agama Khonghucu Indonesia: MATAKIN).

== See also ==
- Confucius
- Four Books and Five Classics
- Great Learning
- Confucianism
- Confucian Academy
- Confucian church
- Confucian ritual religion
- Chinese folk religion in Southeast Asia
