= Shimian County =

Shimian County 石棉县 • ꏂꂴꑤ • ཧྲི་མན་རྫོང
- County
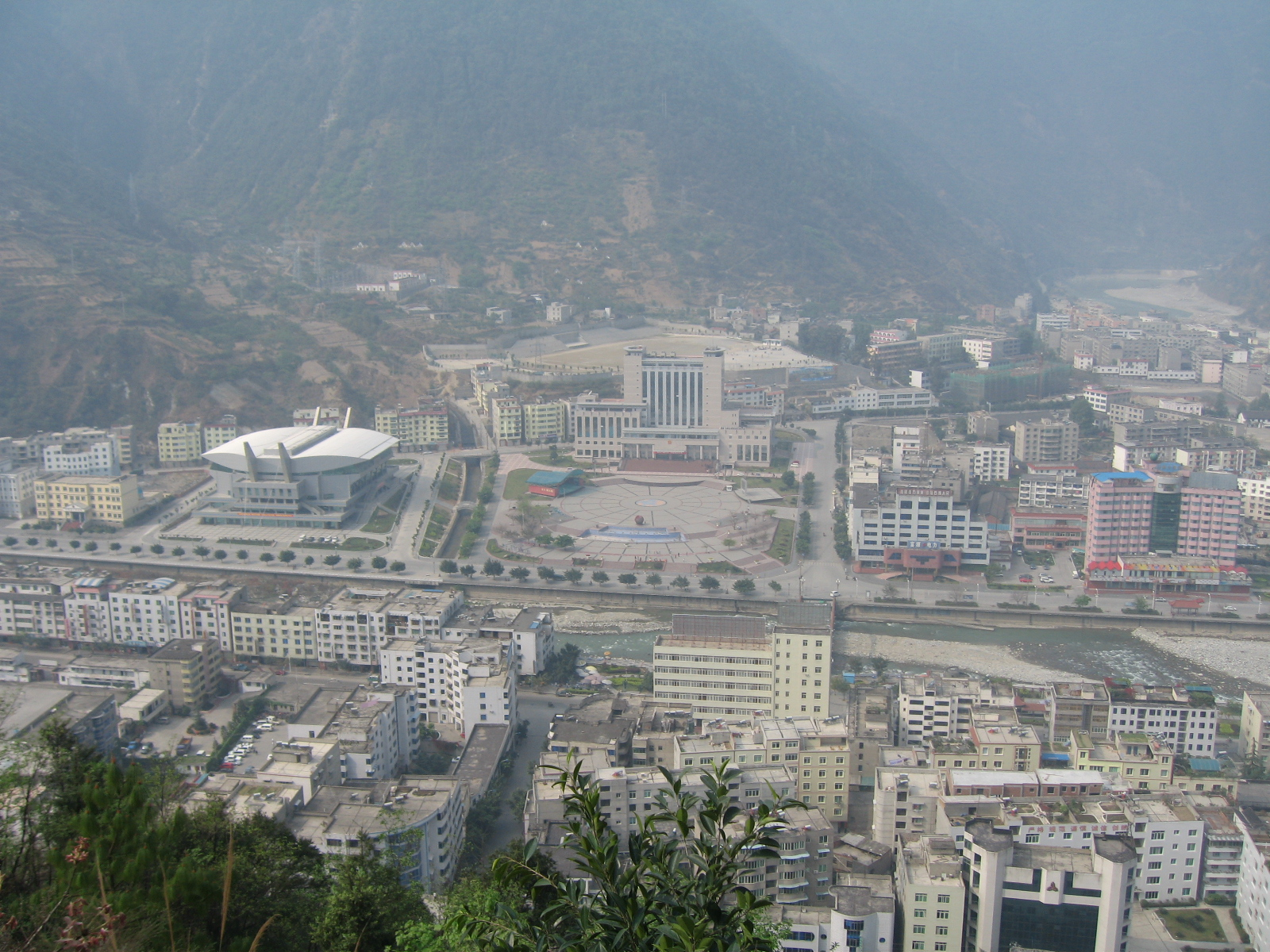
- Shimian county seat

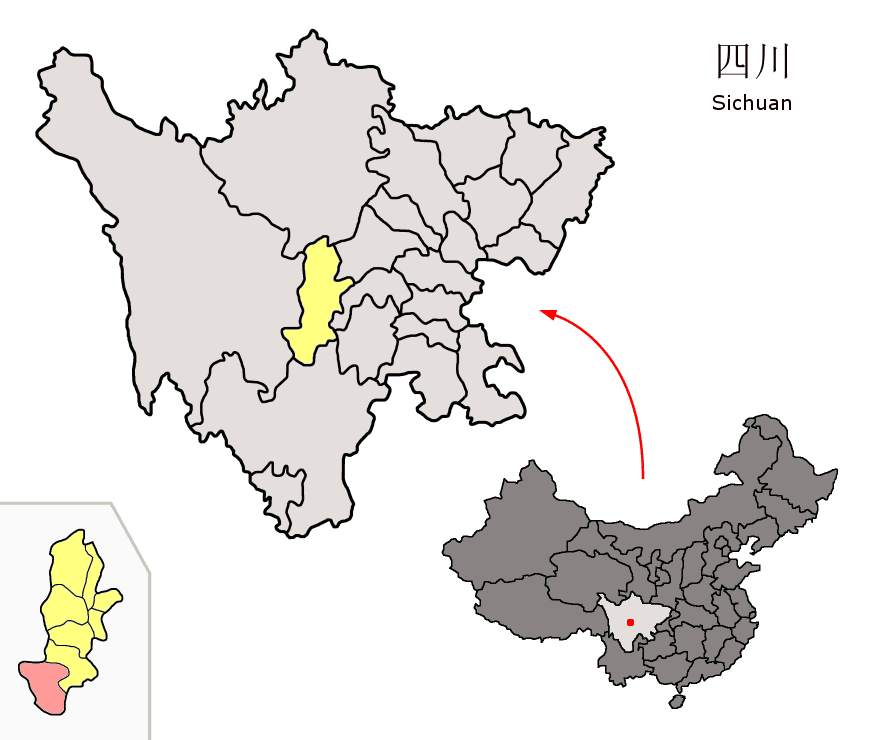
- Location of Shimian County (red) within Ya'an City (yellow) and Sichuan
- Coordinates: 29°13′35″N 102°21′37″E
- Country: China
- Province: Sichuan
- Prefecture-level city: Ya'an
- County seat: Xinmian Subdistrict

Area
  - Total: 2,678 km^{2} (1,034 sq mi)

Population (2020)
  - Total: 114,116
  - Density: 42.61/km^{2} (110.4/sq mi)
- Time zone: UTC+8 (China Standard)
- Website: www.shimian.gov.cn

Shimian County (Chinese: 石棉县; pinyin: Shímián Xiàn; lit. 'Asbestos county'; Yi: ꏂꂴꑤ shy miep xiep; Tibetan: ཧྲི་མན་རྫོང, Wylie: hri man rdzong) is both the southernmost and westernmost county in the prefecture-level city of Ya'an, Sichuan Province, China. The county seat, Miancheng Subdistrict (棉城街道), and the neighboring town, Xinmian (新棉镇), are often together referred to as Shimian. As of the 2010 census, Shimian County has a population of 123,600. The G5 Beijing–Kunming Expressway now passes through Shimian along the route between Kunming and Chengdu.

The county is located at the eastern edge of the Hengduan Mountains and surrounds the Dadu River. The mountain ranges in Shimian County consist of the Daxue Mountains in the west, the Xiaoxiang Range to the southeast, and the Daxiang Range to the northeast.

== Administrative divisions ==
Shimian County administers 1 subdistrict, 3 towns, 3 townships and 5 ethnic townships:

- Xinmian Subdistrict (新棉街道)
- Huilong Town (回隆镇; ꉼꇊꍔ)
- Meiluo Town (美罗镇)
- Anshunchang Town (安顺场镇)
- Yonghe Township (永和乡)
- Yingzheng Township (迎政乡)
- Fengle Township (丰乐乡)
- Xieluo Tibetan Ethnic Township (蟹螺藏族乡; ཞའེ་ལུའོ་བོད་རིགས་ཞང)
- Liziping Yi Ethnic Township (栗子坪彝族乡; ꆹꊪꀻꆈꌠꑣ)
- Xinmin Tibetan and Yi Ethnic Township (新民藏族彝族乡)
- Caoke Tibetan Ethnic Township (草科藏族乡; ཚ་ཁོ་བོད་རིགས་ཞང)
- Wanggangping Yi and Tibetan Ethnic Township (王岗坪彝族藏族乡)

== Climate ==
Climate data for Shimian, elevation 891 m (2,923 ft), (1991–2020 normals, extremes 1991–present)
Month	Jan	Feb	Mar	Apr	May	Jun	Jul	Aug	Sep	Oct	Nov	Dec	Year
Record high °C (°F)	22.3 (72.1)	32.6 (90.7)	35.6 (96.1)	37.9 (100.2)	37.9 (100.2)	39.1 (102.4)	41.0 (105.8)	40.9 (105.6)	38.5 (101.3)	32.7 (90.9)	29.6 (85.3)	20.5 (68.9)	41.0 (105.8)
Mean daily maximum °C (°F)	12.6 (54.7)	16.1 (61.0)	20.5 (68.9)	25.6 (78.1)	27.5 (81.5)	28.3 (82.9)	30.7 (87.3)	30.6 (87.1)	26.3 (79.3)	21.7 (71.1)	18.3 (64.9)	13.5 (56.3)	22.6 (72.8)
Daily mean °C (°F)	8.4 (47.1)	11.0 (51.8)	14.7 (58.5)	18.9 (66.0)	21.3 (70.3)	22.8 (73.0)	24.7 (76.5)	24.6 (76.3)	21.5 (70.7)	17.7 (63.9)	13.9 (57.0)	9.5 (49.1)	17.4 (63.4)
Mean daily minimum °C (°F)	5.2 (41.4)	7.1 (44.8)	10.4 (50.7)	14.3 (57.7)	17.2 (63.0)	19.3 (66.7)	21.0 (69.8)	21.0 (69.8)	18.6 (65.5)	15.2 (59.4)	11.1 (52.0)	6.6 (43.9)	13.9 (57.1)
Record low °C (°F)	−2.6 (27.3)	−2.2 (28.0)	1.8 (35.2)	5.6 (42.1)	8.8 (47.8)	12.0 (53.6)	15.7 (60.3)	15.3 (59.5)	11.0 (51.8)	8.1 (46.6)	2.4 (36.3)	−0.5 (31.1)	−2.6 (27.3)
Average precipitation mm (inches)	1.8 (0.07)	4.9 (0.19)	22.3 (0.88)	53.8 (2.12)	80.3 (3.16)	136.4 (5.37)	185.9 (7.32)	173.3 (6.82)	96.5 (3.80)	34.8 (1.37)	10.9 (0.43)	1.6 (0.06)	802.5 (31.59)
Average precipitation days (≥ 0.1 mm)	1.6	3.5	9.3	13.5	15.6	20.4	18.9	17.3	16.6	11.0	4.5	1.5	133.7
Average snowy days	0.3	0.1	0	0	0	0	0	0	0	0	0	0.1	0.5
Average relative humidity (%)	55	53	55	60	66	76	77	76	79	76	69	62	67
Mean monthly sunshine hours	88.4	102.3	122.3	138.1	113.6	84.2	122.7	134.7	76.8	59.9	80.9	76.0	1,199.9
Percentage possible sunshine	27	32	33	36	27	20	29	33	21	17	25	24	27
Source: China Meteorological Administration all-time extreme temperature

== Notable people ==
- Lai Ning, a teenager celebrated as a martyr after his death fighting a wildfire.
