= Holy Confucian Church =

Confucian religious organisation in China

Holy Confucian Church 孔圣会 Kǒngshènghuì
- Type: Confucian church
- Classification: Confucianism
- Orientation: Gongyang school (New Text Confucianism)
- Scripture: Four Books and Five Classics
- Polity: Self-supporting
- Founder: Zhou Beichen
- Origin: 2009 (first local congregation), 2013 (Sanhe Renai), 2015 (national church); China
- Aid organization: Sanhe Renai Cultural Foundation
- Official website: http://www.sanherenai.com/

The Holy Confucian Church or Holy Church of Confucius (孔圣会 Kǒngshènghuì) or Holy Confucian Church of China (中华孔圣会 Zhōnghuá Kǒngshènghuì) is a religious organisation of Confucianism in China, formed by local Confucian churches or halls (孔圣堂 Kǒngshèngtáng). A grassroots movement of local Confucian churches was initiated in 2009 by Zhou Beichen, a disciple of the Confucian philosopher Jiang Qing, when he founded the first church in Shenzhen, The aim was to develop a network of local Confucian churches throughout the country, later to be unified into a national body and possibly become a state religion in China. The national and international body, the Holy Confucian Church of China, was established in late 2015.

== History ==
Zhou Beichen was born in the province of Guizhou in 1965. He studied at the Guizhou University and had work experiences in journalism, publishing and teaching. In the 1980s he was interested in Western philosophy, while in the 1990s he studied the works of many contemporary Neo-Confucian circles.

Later, Zhou Beichen approached to Jiang Qing's work on the Gongyang (公羊) school of New Text Confucianism, especially the idea of political Confucianism or the "outer kingship" (外王). In 1996 he met Jiang Qing in person and they founded together the Yangming Academy in Guizhou. Between that year and 2003 he settled down in Shenzhen, making a living with business activity and planning a movement of Confucian holy halls (Kongshengtang), the first of which was eventually founded in 2009. In 2010 it was officially registered as a non-governmental and non-profit (fēi qǐyè 非企业) organisation of public interest (gōngyì 公益), affiliated with the Federation of Confucian Culture of Qufu City. It received support from the Confucian Academy of Hong Kong, although they have remained independent from one another. It also maintained close relations with the Shenzhen local government, and high-ranking dignitaries of the State Administration for Religious Affairs (alias, the United Front Work Department of the Chinese Communist Party) attended its ceremonies.

Other Confucian groups blossomed across China over the following years, so that on 1 November 2015 a committee of Confucian scholars, including Jiang Qing, Kang Xiaoguang, Zhang Xianglong and Sheng Hong amongst others, gathered in Shenzhen for the formal establishment of a national and international Holy Confucian Church, based in China but facing the whole world, which would encompass all local Confucian congregations and civil organisations. Jiang Qing was appointed as the spiritual leader of the church.

Some Confucian scholars saw the Holy Confucian Church as a continuation of the Confucian Church that was founded in 1912 by Kang Youwei, a Confucian reformer, but which was later disbanded because of the hostile political climate at that time. The contemporary Holy Confucian Church aims to foster folk Confucian and traditional religion in a period of deep crisis of the Chinese civilisation, and to represent a "body" for the "soul" of the Chinese, or a new embodiment of the "wandering soul" of Confucianism, which was bereft of its social organisation when the Chinese empire collapsed and the transformation of society thenceforth led to a loss of importance of Confucian temples, academies and ancestral shrines in the life of the Chinese.

Besides the promotion of traditional Chinese culture, the church's constitution also mentions the aim of maintaining the "religious ecology" (宗教生态 zōngjiào shēngtài) of Chinese society through the absorption and reinterpretation of foreign and heterodox religions into Confucianism.

== Structure ==
The Holy Confucian Church is highly structured, both in its doctrine of the faith and in its social organisation. The reference to its "holiness" in its name means that the church reflects the sacred order of nature reflected in Tian (天, "Heaven") and ancestral ties, both of which are objects of worship. Its local congregations (孔圣堂 Kǒngshèngtáng) are at the same times schools and temples (学庙和一 xué miào hé yī) for the education of the individuals and the moral reconstitution of society, that is to say, the filial way (孝慈之道 xiàocí zhī dào) and spiritual home (精神家园 jīngshén jiāyuán) of Chinese life. Its worship halls are called dàochǎng (道场 "place of the way"), a term for halls where doctrines are preached to the disciples.

== Economy ==
The Holy Confucian Church is related to the Sanhe Ren'ai Cultural Foundation, the Shenzhen branch of the Sanhe International Group, headed by Zhang Hua. The foundation's purpose is the promotion of various forms of Confucianism, and it was established in 2013 with the endorsement of Gao Zhanxiang of Chinese Ministry of Culture and the care of the municipal government of Shenzhen and of the local committee of the United Front Work Department of the Chinese Communist Party. Zhang Hua was the chairman of the church's administrative council at the time of its establishment.

In order to develop independently from the support of unrelated sponsors, in 2010 the first local Confucian church established by Zhou Beichen in Shenzhen adopted a "sustainable development model", also termed the "Shenzhen model". The policy implies the self-support of the church through wedding and funeral rites, and through schools of "Confucian corporate culture" for business companies. The goal of the church is to provide non-profit services, and it offers education, rituals and other activities which are free of charge. The nationwide Holy Confucian Church established in 2015 aims to replicate the Shenzhen model all over China and abroad, and to form missionary institutes, community-oriented lecture circuits and Confucian schools. These objectives are financed by integrated social donations and funding members, contributions from local government for public services at Temples of Confucius, the church's own industrial platform, and other resources.

== See also ==
- Confucian church
- Confucius Institute

== Sources ==
- Billioud, Sebastien; Thoraval, Joël (2015). The Sage and the People: The Confucian Revival in China. Oxford University Press. ISBN 978-0190258146.
- Payette, Alex (19–24 July 2014). Shenzhen's Kongshengtang: Religious Confucianism and Local Moral Governance (PDF). 23rd World Congress of Political Science, Role of Religion in Political Life (Panel RC43). Archived from the original (PDF) on 23 October 2017.
