= Confucian church =

Congregational religious institutions of Confucianism

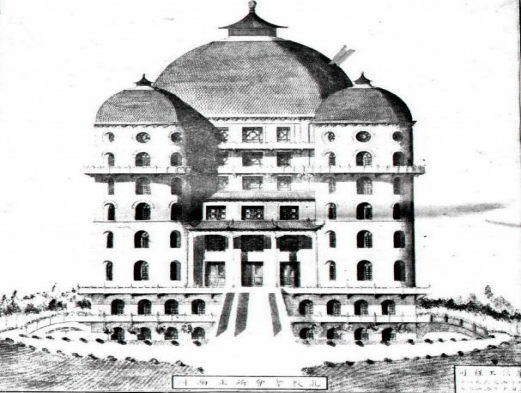
Project for the Confucian Church Headquarters (孔教总会堂) in Beijing, next to the Confucian University. The Confucian University was opened in 1923, but the main church was never completed.

The Confucian church (Chinese: 孔教会; pinyin: Kǒng jiàohuì or Rú jiàohuì) is a Confucian religious and social institution of the congregational type. It was first proposed by Kang Youwei (1858–1927) near the end of the 19th century, as a state religion of Qing China following a European model.

The "Confucian church" model was later replicated by overseas Chinese communities, who established independent Confucian churches active at the local level, especially in Indonesia and the United States.

There has been a revival of Confucianism in contemporary China since around 2000, which has triggered the proliferation of Confucian academies (书院; shūyuàn); the opening and reopening of temples of Confucius; the new phenomenon of grassroots Confucian communities or congregations (社区儒学; shèqū rúxué); and renewed talks about a national "Confucian church".

== Kang Youwei's national Confucian Church ==
The idea of a "Confucian Church" as the state religion of China was proposed in detail by Kang Youwei as part of an early New Confucian effort to revive the social relevance of Confucianism. The idea was proposed at a time when Confucianism was not institutionalized, after the collapse of the Qing dynasty and the Chinese empire. Kang modeled his ideal "Confucian Church" after European national Christian churches—hierarchical and centralised institutions closely bound to the state, with local church branches, Sunday prayers and choirs, missions, journals, and even baptisms, devoted to the worship and the spread of the teachings of Confucius.

The large community of Confucian literati—who were left without an organization or an outlet for their rituals, values, and identity after the dissolution of state Confucianism, supported such projects. Similar models were also adopted by various newly created Confucian folk religious sects, such as the Xixinshe, the Daode Xueshe, and the Wanguo Daodehui.

The Confucian Church was founded in 1912 by a disciple of Kang, Chen Huanzhang, and within a few years it established 132 branches in China. From 1913 to 1916, an important debate took place about whether Confucianism should become the state religion (guo jiao) and thus be inscribed in the constitution of China. This did not occur and anti-religious campaigns in the 1920s led to a full dissolution of the Confucian church.

== Modern churches and congregations ==
While Kang's idea was not realized in China, it was carried forward in Hong Kong and among overseas Chinese people. The Hong Kong branch of Kang's movement became known as the "Confucian Academy" (孔教学院), while the Indonesian branch became the Supreme Council for the Confucian Religion in Indonesia. Members believe in Tian, with Confucius as the prophet (Indonesian: nabi). Chinese people in the United States established independent, local Confucian churches such as the Confucius Church of Sacramento or the Confucius Church of Salinas.

In contemporary China, the Confucian revival of the 21st century has developed a variety of interrelated ways: the proliferation of Confucian academies, the resurgence of Confucian rites, and the birth of new forms of Confucian activity on the local level, such as Confucian communities. Some scholars consider the reconstruction of Chinese lineage associations and their ancestral shrines, as well as cults and temples worshiping natural and national gods from other Chinese traditional religions, as part of the revival of Confucianism.

Other groups associated with the revival include folk religions or salvationist religions that have a Confucian focus. Confucian churches, for example the Yidan xuetang (一耽学堂) in Beijing, the Mengmutang (孟母堂) of Shanghai, the Way of the Gods according to the Confucian Tradition, Phoenix Churches, and the Confucian Fellowship (儒教道坛; Rújiào Dàotán) in northern Fujian have spread rapidly over the years since their foundation. Ancestral shrines of the Kong family have also reopened, as well as Confucian-teaching churches.

The Hong Kong Confucian Academy has expanded its activities to the mainland, constructing statues of Confucius, Confucian hospitals, restoring temples and sponsoring other activities. In 2009, Zhou Beichen founded the Holy Hall of Confucius (孔圣堂; Kǒngshèngtáng) in Shenzhen, inspired by Kang Youwei's idea of the Confucian Church. It is also affiliated with the Federation of Confucian Culture in Qufu, a nationwide movement of congregations and civil organisations that was unified in 2015 as the Church of Confucius (孔圣会; Kǒngshènghuì).

Chinese folk religion's temples and kinship ancestral shrines sometimes choose Confucian liturgy during special occasions (that is called 儒 rú, or sometimes 正统 zhèngtǒng; 'orthoprax ritual style'), led by Confucian ritual masters (礼生; lǐshēng) who worship the gods enshrined, instead of Taoist or other popular rituals. "Confucian businessmen" (rushang; 'learned businessman') is a recently revived term to identify people among the entrepreneurial or economic elite who recognize their social responsibilities and therefore apply Confucian cultural practices to their business.

Contemporary New Confucian scholars Jiang Qing and Kang Xiaoguang are among the most influential supporters behind the campaign to establish a national "Confucian Church". Jiang Qing is the current spiritual leader of the Church of Confucius.

In Japan, Confucian Shinto is organised as part of Sect Shinto. Similar Confucian-focused sects also exist in South Korea.

== List of churches ==
- Confucian Fellowship (Chinese: 儒教道坛; pinyin: Rújiào Dàotán)
- Daode Xueshe (Chinese: 道德学社; lit. 'Community for the Study of the Way and its Virtue')
- Kongshenghui (Chinese: 孔圣会; pinyin: Kǒngshènghuì)
- Kongdaoshe (Chinese: 孔道社; lit. 'Community of the Way of Confucius')
- Kong Meng Xuehui (Chinese: 孔孟学会; lit. 'Society of Confucius and Mencius')
- Kong Meng Shengdao Hui (Chinese: 孔孟圣道会; lit. 'Church of the Sacred Way of Confucius and Mencius')
- Mengmutang (Chinese: 孟母堂)
- Ruists' Society (Chinese: 儒社; pinyin: Rúshè) and Ruist Masters' Society (Chinese: 儒士社; pinyin: Rúshìshè), two modern networks of Confucians in mainland China
- Ruzong Luandao (Chinese: 儒宗鸾道; lit. 'Way of the Phoenix according to the Confucian Tradition'), phoenix churches
- Shengdao (Chinese: 圣道; lit. 'Holy Way'), a Xiantiandao branch best known by its corporate name of Tongshanshe (Chinese: 同善社; lit. 'Community of the Goodness')
- Shenglishe (Chinese: 圣理社; lit. 'Community of the Holy Truth')
- Wanguo Daodehui (Chinese: 万国道德会; lit. 'Universal Church of the Way and its Virtue')
- Jiushi teaching (Chinese: 救世教; pinyin: Jiùshì jiào; lit. 'Life Healing'), also known by its corporate name Wushanshe (Chinese: 悟善社; lit. 'Community of the Awakening to the Goodness')
- Xin Rujiao Hui (Chinese: 新儒教会; lit. 'New Confucian Church')
- Xixinshe (Chinese: 洗心社; lit. 'Community of the Pure Heart')
- Xuanyuanism (Chinese: 軒轅教; pinyin: Xuānyuán jiào)
- Yidan xuetang (Chinese: 一耽学堂)
- Zongsheng Hui (Chinese: 宗圣会; lit. 'Church of the Great Sage')

== See also ==
- Boston Confucians
- Chinese folk religion
- Confucian Academy
- Holy Confucian Church
- Kokugaku
- Supreme Council for the Confucian Religion in Indonesia
- Religious Confucianism
- Nanyang Confucian Association

== Sources ==
- Billioud, Sebastien; Joel Thoraval (2015). The Sage and the People: The Confucian Revival in China. Oxford University Press. ISBN 978-0190258146.
- Goossaert, Vincent; David Palmer (2011). The Religious Question in Modern China. University of Chicago Press. ISBN 978-0226005331.
- Clart, Philip. Confucius and the Mediums: Is There a "Popular Confucianism"?. On: T'uong Pao LXXXIX. Brill, Leiden, 2003.
- Fan Lizhu, Chen Na. Revival of Confucianism and Reconstruction of Chinese Identity. Paper presented at: The Presence and Future of Humanity in the Cosmos, ICU, Tokyo, 18–23 March 2015. (a)
- Fan Lizhu, Chen Na. The Religiousness of "Confucianism" and the Revival of Confucian Religion in China Today. On: Cultural Diversity in China 1: 27–43. De Gruyter Open, 2015. ISSN 2353-7795, DOI: 10.1515/cdc-2015-0005
- Payette, Alex. Shenzhen's Kongshengtang: Religious Confucianism and Local Moral Governance. Part of: Role of Religion in Political Life, Panel RC43, 23rd World Congress of Political Science, 19–24 July 2014.
- Stephen C. Angle. Contemporary Confucian Political Philosophy. Polity, 2012. ISBN 0745661300
- Sébastien Billioud. Carrying the Confucian Torch to the Masses: The Challenge of Structuring the Confucian Revival in the People's Republic of China. On: OE 49 (2010)
- Yong Chen. Confucianism as Religion: Controversies and Consequences. BRILL, 2012. ISBN 9004243739
- Ya-pei Kuo. "Christian Civilization" and the Confucian Church: The Origin of Secularist Politics in Modern China. On: Past and Present (2013) 218 (1): 235–264. DOI: 10.1093/pastj/gts030
- Philip Clart, Charles B. Jones. Religion in Modern Taiwan: Tradition and Innovation in a Changing Society. University of Hawaii Press, 2003. ISBN 0824825640.
