= Nanyang Confucian Association =

Singaporean Chinese cultural organization

- 新加坡南洋孔教會
- Founded: March 24, 1914; 112 years ago
- Founder: Tan Ean Kiam
- Founded at: Singapore Chinese Chamber of Commerce and Industry
- Headquarters: 511 Guillemard Road, #02-35 Grandlink Square Singapore 399849
- Website: https://kongzi.org.sg/
- Formerly called: Straits Confucian Association (Before 1949)

The Nanyang Confucian Association (Chinese: 新加坡南洋孔教會) is a Chinese cultural organization in Singapore. It was founded in 1914 under the original name "Straits Confucian Association". In 1949, it was renamed the Nanyang Confucian Association, a name that has been used ever since. The association has long been dedicated to promoting Confucian thought and Chinese culture, as well as advancing education and moral development.

== Mission ==
The mission of the Nanyang Confucian Association is to promote and revitalize the educational and moral culture of Confucius, to foster world peace and human harmony, while supporting various fields of knowledge and public welfare undertakings. The association emphasizes the meaning of the word "education" (教), referring specifically to moral education and cultural enlightenment, and does not regard itself as a religious organization. Its goal is to advocate the core values of Confucianism, to promote the teachings of Confucius and Mencius, in order to restore the original essence, purify the source, and cultivate righteousness in people's hearts.

== History ==
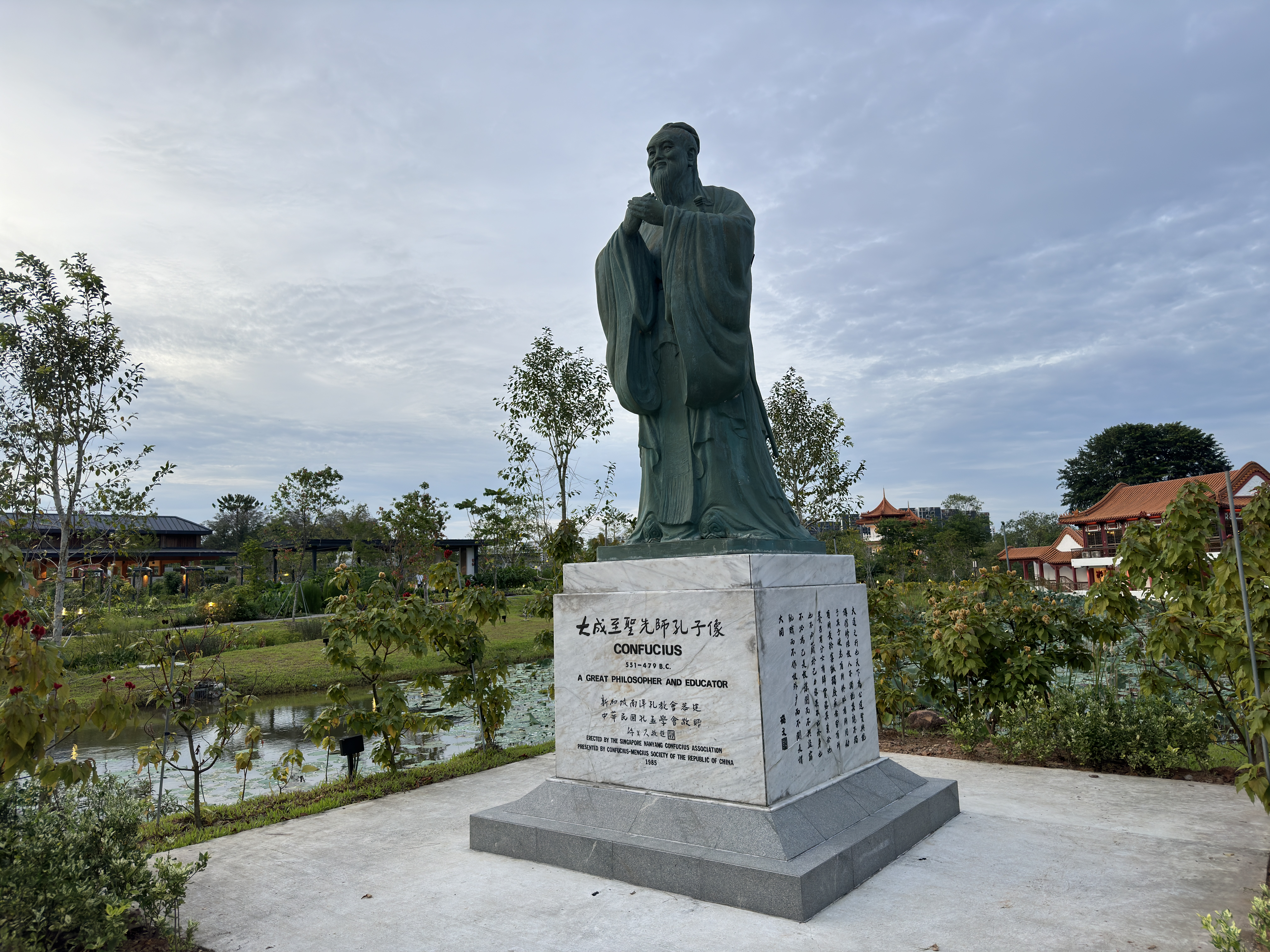
In 1985, the Confucius-Mencius Society of the Republic of China presented a standard statue of Confucius to the Nanyang Confucian Association in Singapore. It is now located in Chinese Garden, Singapore. (Photographed in December 2024)

=== Establishment of the Straits Confucian Association ===
According to historical records, the Straits Confucian Association was established by no later than March 24, 1914. Its initial headquarters was located at the Singapore Chinese Chamber of Commerce and Industry. It was founded by the founder of OCBC Bank, Tan Ean Kiam, and others. From its founding, the Nanyang Confucian Association actively promoted Confucian teachings within the local Chinese community, and its activities flourished. However, during the Japanese occupation of Singapore, its operations were completely suspended for a period. After the war, normal operations resumed in 1949.

=== Establishment of the Association’s Premises ===
In early 1951, the president of the Nanyang Confucian Association, Zheng Zhenwen, resigned due to a trip to Australia, and was succeeded by Lin Qingnian. Upon taking office, Lin immediately began planning the construction of an association building and proposed the establishment of an affiliated library. Consequently, the “Xinghua Library Fundraising Committee” was formed, consisting of Lin Qingnian, Huang Manshi, Zheng Yingxin, He Baoren, and representatives from the book industry union. The library was named “Xinghua,” reflecting the Association’s aspiration to culturally lead the Chinese community. However, the project was ultimately not realized, presumably due to financial difficulties.

In 2007, after Guo Wenlong became president, he initiated reforms including the purchase of new premises, expanding membership, increasing cultural activities, and beginning construction of the Kong Sheng Hall, aiming to make the Association a key center for the revival and transmission of Confucianism locally.

In 2016, the Nanyang Confucian Association held a completion ceremony for its new premises at One Raffles Place and celebrated the 2567th anniversary of Confucius’ birth. The new premises previously housed the Lea Theatre, symbolizing the Association’s century-long struggle and establishment. President Guo Wenlong emphasized that a dedicated board committed to promoting Confucian culture is crucial to the Association’s development. Additionally, the 33rd board introduced, for the first time, two non-Chinese members fluent in Chinese: Malay member Yayahwa and Indian member Ravi Sharma. Attending the ceremony, Member of Parliament Henry Kwek also noted the importance of Confucianism’s integration with other cultures in promoting harmony in contemporary society.

=== Planning the Confucian Temple ===
Starting in 2004, the Nanyang Confucian Association began planning to build a Confucian Temple in Singapore and established the “Confucian Temple Planning Committee” led by Dr. Du Nanfa. The first meeting was held in June of the same year, and the tentative name for the temple was “Confucian Hall, Singapore” (Chinese: 孔聖堂). The estimated construction cost was SGD 10 million, with plans for a multi-story building that would include a worship space, teaching facilities, and a library.

This plan marked a shift in the Association’s approach—from an earlier stance that rejected worship of deities and focused on cultural education, to a strategy that also incorporated religious functions. This change sparked academic discussions about the Association’s religious nature.

In 2007, after Guo Wenlong assumed the presidency, advancing the Confucian Temple project became one of the key priorities. In 2009, the Association’s council approved a memorandum proposing that the Singapore government lead the temple’s construction, making it a center for the dissemination and study of Confucian thought. It was hoped that the groundbreaking ceremony could be held during the 2011 World Chinese Entrepreneurs Convention. The proposal received support from some political figures, such as Xu Tongmei, but ultimately failed due to insufficient funding and administrative support. Despite the setback, the Nanyang Confucian Association has not entirely abandoned the idea and continues to seek support and cooperation both domestically and internationally.

Additionally, Guo Wenlong expressed opposition to the construction of a large Christian church in Confucius’ hometown of Qufu, asserting that all Chinese people should uphold Confucian cultural traditions and have the right to express opinions on Chinese cultural affairs.

=== Promotion of Chinese Language Education ===
In 2014, Guo Wenlong, president of the Nanyang Confucian Association, together with representatives from the Chinese communities in Singapore, Malaysia, and Indonesia, jointly established the “Bintan Nanyang Resources Enterprise” on Bintan Island, Indonesia. The initiative aimed to promote adult Chinese language education locally and revive the long-interrupted tradition of Chinese language teaching. This non-profit program planned to recruit retired Chinese language teachers from Singapore to teach Chinese courses ranging from basic to advanced levels, along with Chinese cultural knowledge. The courses were open to all ethnic groups, emphasizing cultural heritage and social integration. The collaboration received support from the ASEAN Nanyang University Foundation in Indonesia and the Bintan Tuan Hua School. Plans were also made to expand into Traditional Chinese Medicine healthcare and senior cultural village facilities.

=== Modern Era ===
On July 29, 2015, the Nanyang Confucian Association signed a Memorandum of Understanding with the Singapore University of Social Sciences (SUSS) to establish a Confucian Studies scholarship funded by the Confucius Cultural Foundation Ltd. This scholarship is exclusively available to students pursuing a Bachelor’s degree in Chinese language and literature. The program lasts four years and provides financial support each academic year to four students who excel in Confucian philosophy and literature subjects.

In 2023, the Nanyang Confucian Association celebrated its 110th anniversary by hosting an international Confucianism seminar themed “The Vitality of Confucianism in Contemporary Times.” Scholars from Mainland China, Taiwan, Hong Kong, and Singapore were invited to jointly explore the value and application of Confucian thought in modern society. The event also featured concerts and exhibitions, demonstrating the Association’s multifaceted efforts in cultural promotion.

== Activities ==
To promote Confucian ethics and Chinese culture, the Nanyang Confucian Association has long organized various cultural events and educational programs. These include the “Filial Piety Music Evening,” “Secondary School Filial Piety Camp,” “Filial Piety Essay Competition,” and “Filial Piety Forum,” using filial piety as a starting point to disseminate Confucian ethical values to the public, especially the youth. In addition, the Association regularly holds Confucian cultural forums and reading clubs, and publishes Confucian classic quotes in the Lianhe Zaobao newspaper to enhance public understanding and awareness of traditional culture. The youth group is also active, dedicated to nurturing the next generation of Confucian scholars.

To encourage young people to study Chinese philosophy and Confucian classics, the Nanyang Confucian Association awards scholarships to students excelling in Chinese philosophy during Confucius’ birthday celebrations. The Association also collaborates with universities and cultural institutions to promote academic research and international exchanges in Confucian studies.

== Controversies ==
=== Section 377A ===
In October 2018, during the annual Confucius Birthday Commemoration Dinner, the Nanyang Confucian Association sparked controversy over comments related to Section 377A of the Penal Code (which regulates sexual acts between men). The then-president, Guo Wenlong, expressed on behalf of the board opposition to the repeal of Section 377A, citing reasons including that homosexual acts "violate nature, natural law, and humanity," and stating that repealing it would pave the way for the legalization of same-sex marriage. Addressing around 350 guests, he emphasized:

"When people uphold traditional culture, society can remain stable and harmonious; when people deny and abandon traditional culture, society will fall into chaos and unrest."

The then Vice President and associate professor of Chinese Studies at the National University of Singapore, Wang Changwei, disagreed with this stance. He argued that Confucian thought has never advocated moral judgment against homosexuals. The following day, he resigned from his position as vice president and announced his withdrawal from the Confucian Association on social media. However, Wang also publicly acknowledged the Association's contributions in recent years to cultural development and the promotion of Chinese philosophy, stating that he would continue to follow and support its cultural endeavors. Guo Wenlong expressed respect for Wang's position and emphasized that despite their differences, their relationship remained unaffected. After his resignation, Wang was still invited to serve as an academic advisor. Scholar Xu Qixiong, who attended the event, also published a commentary article in Lianhe Zaobao, systematically refuting Guo Wenlong's remarks and emphasizing that Confucian tradition does not morally condemn homosexuality, advocating that tolerance is fundamental to Chinese culture.

== See also ==
- Confucius
- Confucianism
- Confucian Church
