= Spring and Autumn Courts =

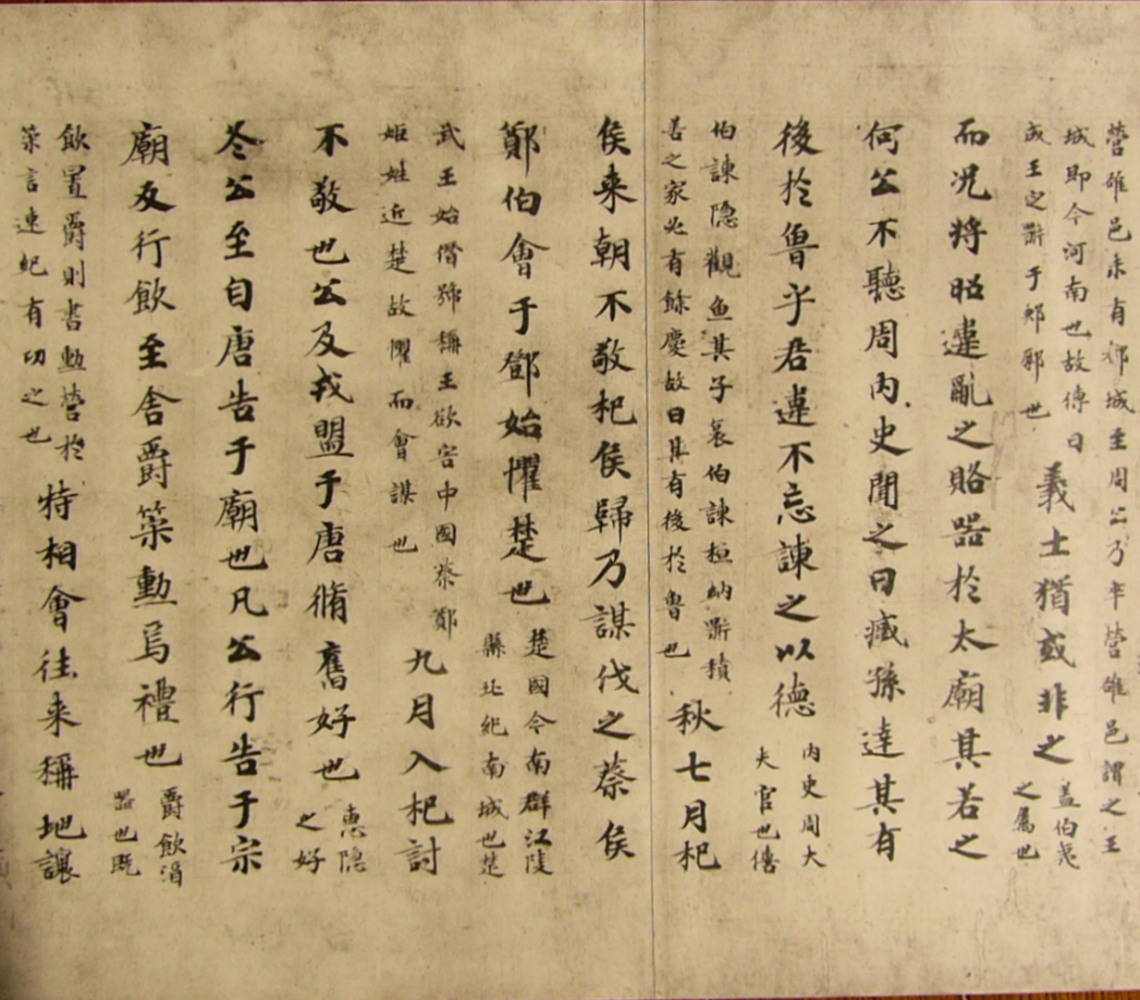
Replica of the Spring and Autumn Annals

In early years of Han dynasty of ancient China (202 BC – 9 AD), a judicial system emerged where judges make their decisions based on the Spring and Autumn Annals. The system was later known as Chunqiu Jueyu, or "case decisions based on the Spring and Autumn Annals" (simplified Chinese: 春秋决狱; traditional Chinese: 春秋決獄; pinyin: Chūnqiū Juéyù; Wade–Giles: Ch'un-ch'iu Chüeh-yü).

== History ==
Early imperial court of the Han dynasty continued adopting laws formulated in the Qin dynasty, which were criticised to be too harsh and ancient to the contemporary society. After Emperor Wu of Han ascended the throne in 141 AD and Confucianism gradually became the prevailing ideology in the court, judges started to make judgments in accordance with the Spring and Autumn Annals, a centerpiece of Confucianism.

Unlike a rigid sentencing with sole reference to the law book only, the core principle of this court system was to determine the innocence and the sentencing of the accused by establishing the motives and intentions, known in Chinese as "論心定罪" or "determining the punishment for the crime by assessing the heart". It was seen as one of the earliest forms of sentencing. Dong Zhongshu, a prominent court official, led the effort to compile a list of 232 case decisions based on the Annals which laid down the guiding principle for the judiciary practice.

The system lasted until the Confucianism ideas fused with that of Legalism in Tang dynasty.

== Analysis ==
The new judicial practice introduced Confucianism into the legal system that strengthened the ideology's influence in the ruling class, while stabilising the imperial reign. However, it was slammed for opening doors to speech crimes as the subjectivity and the ambiguity in the practice allowed rulers to make arbitrary decisions with their subjective will.

== See also ==
- Mens rea
