= Lai Ning =

Kid Chinese

- 赖宁
- Born: 20 October 1973
- Died: 13 March 1988 (aged 14); Shimian County, Ya'an, Sichuan, China
- Known for: Death while fighting a forest fire

Lai Ning
- Traditional Chinese: 賴寧 賴甯
- Simplified Chinese: 赖宁
Transcriptions
Standard Mandarin
- Hanyu Pinyin: Lài Níng

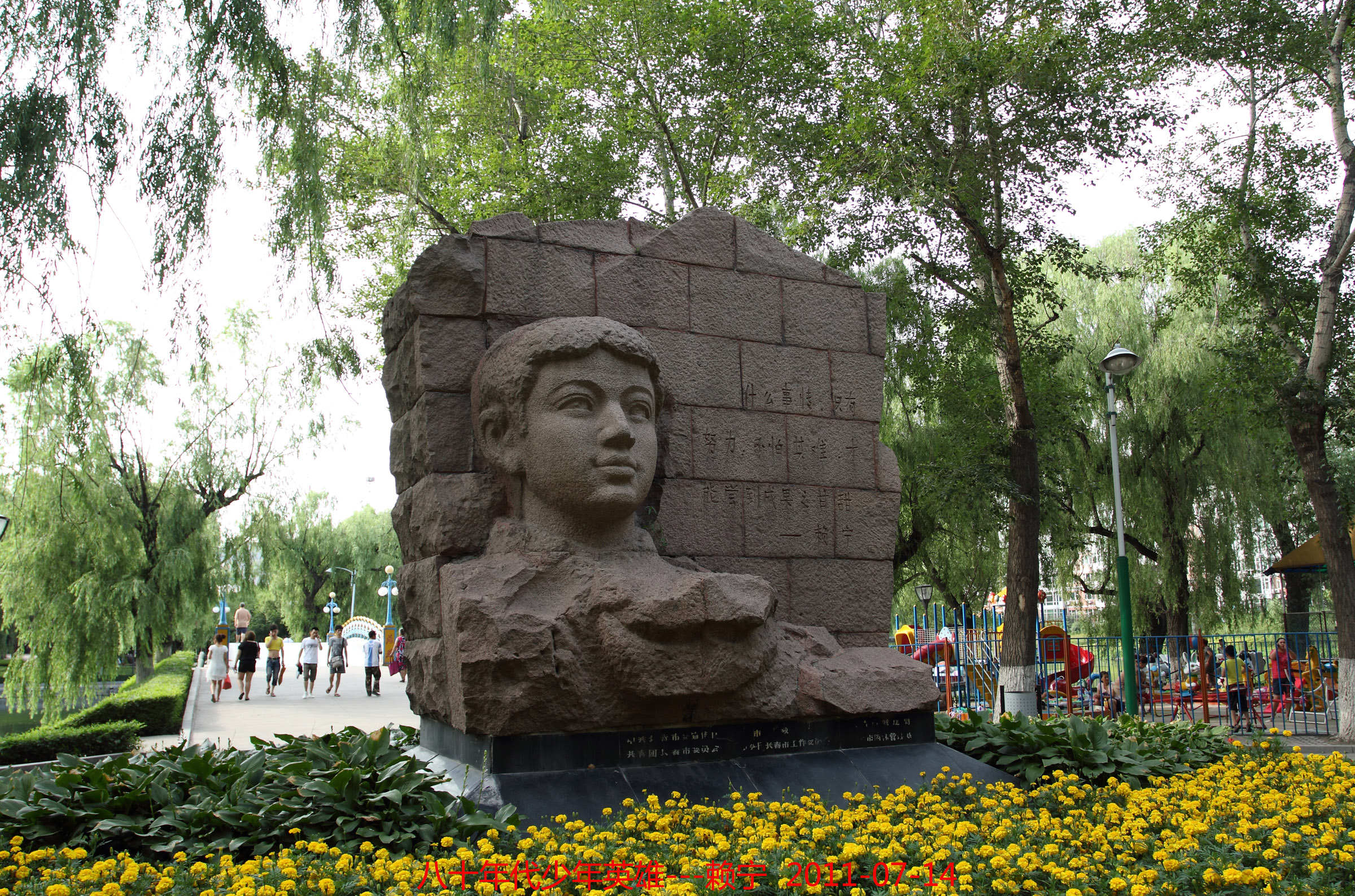
Statue commemorating Lai Ning in Changchun

Lai Ning (Chinese: 赖宁; pinyin: Lài Níng; 20 October 1973 – 13 March 1988) was a Chinese teenager who died fighting a forest fire in Shimian County, Sichuan. Lai Ning's actions were deemed heroic by the Chinese government and Lai has been celebrated as a hero and martyr in contemporary China.

== Personal life and death ==
Lai Ning was a fourteen-year-old schoolboy living in Shimian County where he was regarded as a loner by his classmates. On March 13, 1988, a wildfire was threatening a nearby forest and schoolchildren were mobilized to help fight the fire. Lai voluntarily assisted the firefighting efforts for five hours. Lai was eventually overcome by the flames and killed in the fire.

== Legacy ==
Lai Ning was later declared a "revolutionary martyr" by the Chinese government for his role in combating the wildfire to protect his town. Over the next year, his story was used increasingly in Chinese propaganda as a model of courage and duty for Chinese youth. This was especially important in the aftermath of the 1989 Tiananmen Square protests when the Chinese government hoped to gain support from Chinese teenagers and promote an alternative example of youth in China. Deng Yingchao declared that "only by plunging into studies of Lai Ning can you become the sound new masters of your country in the 21st century" in the People's Daily.

Since that time, Lai Ning has been commemorated with posters in school classrooms and statues in town squares. In the 1990s, Lai's story was taught in Chinese textbooks to teach students about the importance of protecting Chinese society. The propaganda surrounding Lai Ning was sometimes poorly received within China, and some teachers believed that the calls for emulation were outdated tactics from the Cultural Revolution era.

A miniseries depicting Lai Ning's life was aired in the years following his death and a film was released in 1993.

== See also ==
- Martyrdom in Chinese culture#Modern development
