= Ulrich Libbrecht =

Belgian philosopher and author (1928–2017)

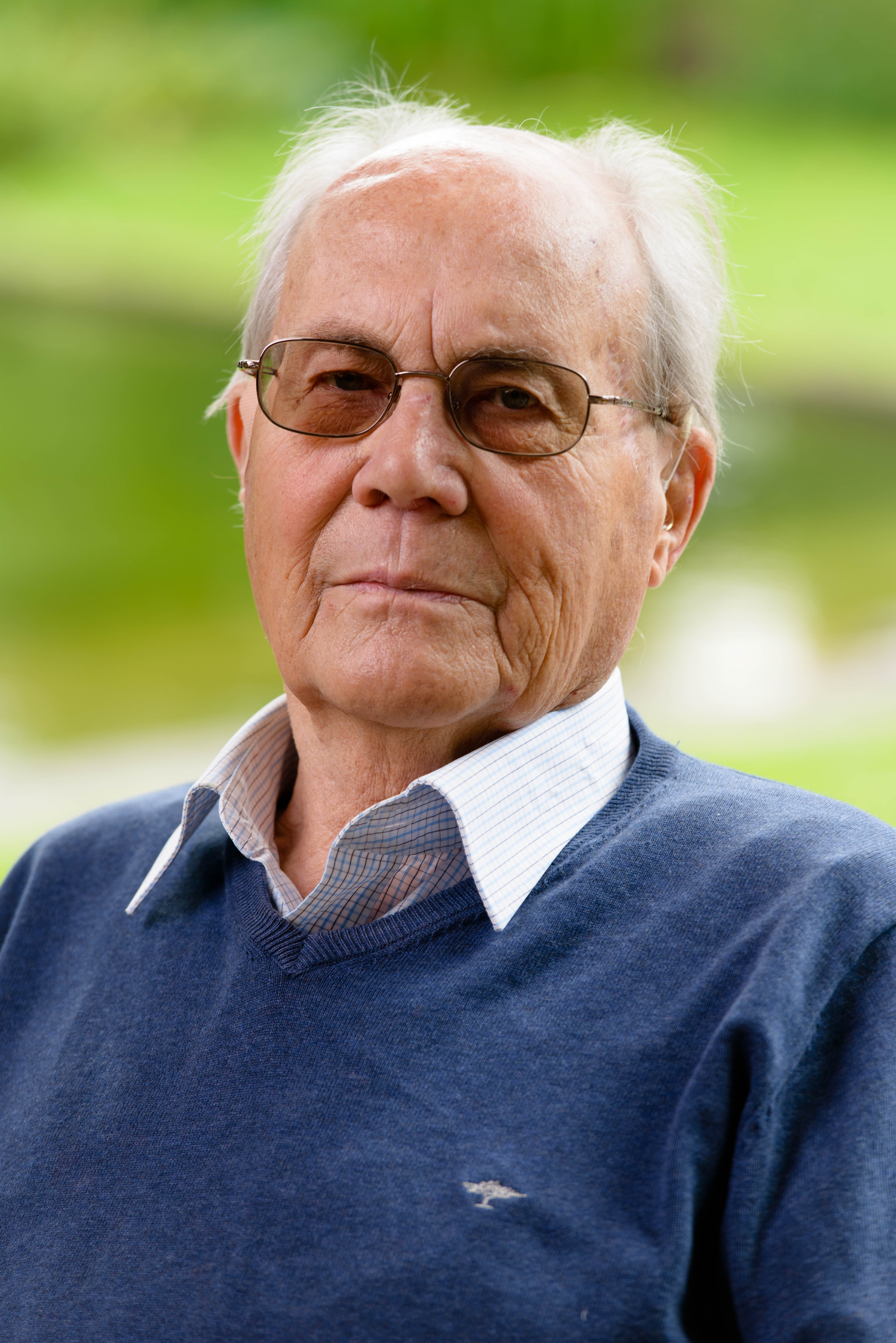
Ulrich Libbrecht

Ulrich Libbrecht (10 July 1928, Avelgem – 15 May 2017) was a Belgian philosopher and author in the field of comparative philosophy. His magnum opus consists of four books in Dutch - called "Introduction to Comparative Philosophy".

An abbreviated version of these works in English, entitled "Within the Four Seas... Introduction to Comparative Philosophy" was published by Peeters Ed. (Leuven, 2007) This book explains how a comparative model, based on the paradigm-free axes of energy and information, accommodates the current world-views of Taoism, Buddhism and Rationalism – representing the Chinese, Indian and Western heritage - and shows how science and religion interrelate within such a global framework.

Prof. dr. Ulrich Libbrecht was an authority in the field of Eastern and Comparative philosophy. He studied sinology in Gent, graduated cum laude in 1972 at the University of Leiden (R.U. Leiden) and that same year became a professor in sinology, Chinese philosophy and buddhology at the University of Leuven. He also founded the School for Comparative Philosophy in Antwerp (Belgium) and School Philosophy East-West in Utrecht (Netherlands).

Ulrich Libbrecht died on 15 May 2017, in the Belgian town of Ronse. No cause of death was released.

== See also ==
- Mathematical Treatise in Nine Sections
