= Lai Yonghai =

Chinese professor of philosophy

Lai Yonghai (Chinese: 赖永海) is a Chinese philosopher of religion. He is currently a professor of the Department of Philosophy and the dean of the Institute of Chinese Culture at Nanjing University.
