= Confucian Academy =

Hong Kong non-governmental organization

The Confucian Academy (孔教學院)
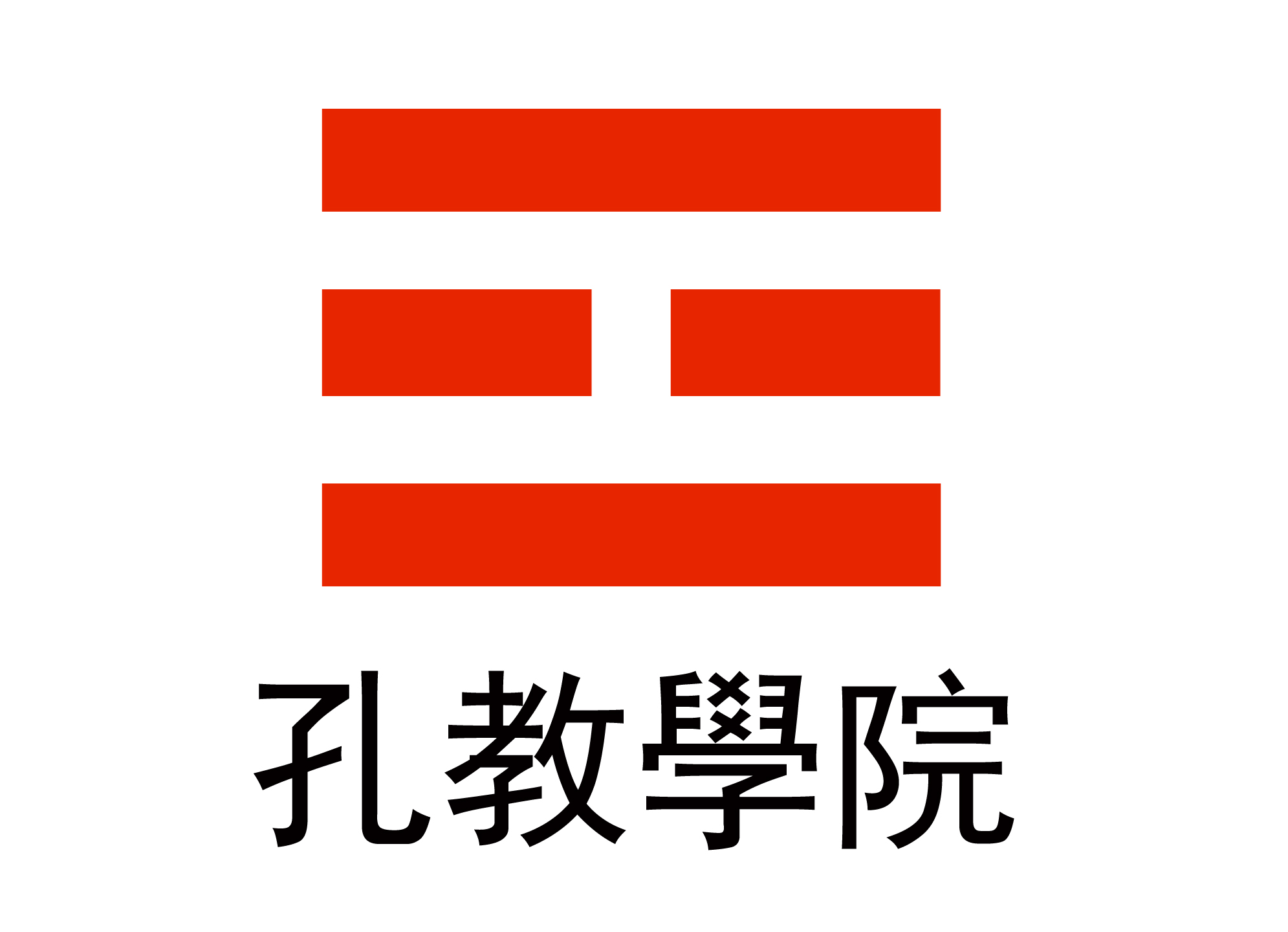
- The Confucian Academy (孔教學院)
- Formation: 1930, Hong Kong
- Type: Non-governmental organization
- Headquarters: 10, Dai Shing Street, Wong Tai Sin, Kowloon, Hong Kong
- Current President: Dr. Tong Yun-Kai (湯恩佳); 501 Star House, 3 Salisbury Road, Tsim Sha Tsui, Kowloon, Hong Kong
- Website: www.confucianacademy.com

The Confucian Academy is a non-governmental organization (NGO) founded in 1930 by Dr. Chen Huanzhang (陳煥章) to promote Confucianism. It follows Confucius's teachings to provide students with the relevant knowledge. His teachings are based on a moral code for human relations, which emphasizes the importance of tradition and rites.

== Background Information ==
=== Objectives ===
- Promotes Confucian as the nation's major religion in order to enhance the cohesion of the Chinese nation
- Convinces the Hong Kong government to list the Confucius's birthday as a public holiday in Hong Kong
- Establishes the Confucian church in various cities and towns around the world
- Includes the ideas of Confucian in primary, secondary and university teaching areas
- Constructs the Confucius Memorial Hall in Hong Kong and make it as the world's center of the Confucianism

=== Educational mission ===
The academy upholds the Confucian teaching "Left No Child Behind" (有教無類), trying to cultivate all the talents of children. They teach according to the different potential of the children (因才施教) so as to help them to grow to contribute to the society. They are committed to cooperate with the parents and the community to build a good learning and educational environment for the kids.

Succeeding the deanship in 1992, Dr Tang continued to contribute to the education scholarship and even set up the 'Confucian Academy Dr Tang Enjia reward scheme'(孔教學院湯恩佳院長經訓科獎勵計畫). It aims to fund students from the academy and other tertiary students to engage in Confucianism academic research, and also to enhance the communication between the academy and the local major religious groups. The academy is dedicated to hold more joint talks and various social activities with other religious parties.

=== Founder ===
Dr. Chen Huanzhang (陳煥章)(1881–1933) founded the Hong Kong Confucian Academy in 1930. He was born in Gaoyao, Guangdong. He went to United States in 1905 to continues his studies, and received Ph.D. in philosophy with his publication "The Economic Principles of Confucius". In 1912, he founded the Confucian Society (孔教會) with his teacher Kang Youwei (康有為) in Shanghai. He then came to Hong Kong in 1930 and established the Confucian Academy.

=== History ===
- 1930 Chen Huanzhang (陳煥章), student of Kang Youwei (康有為), founded the Confucian Academy.
- 1930 The Confucian Secondary School (孔教中學) was established.
- 1931 Confucian Tai Shing Primary school (孔教小學) was established.
- 1933 Chen Huanzhang died, Zhu Yuzhen (朱汝珍) took over. The academy was registered as a limited company
- 1942 Zhu Yuzhen left Hong Kong, Lu Xiangfu (盧湘父) took over.
- 1970 Lu Xiangfu died at the age of 102, Huang Yuntian (黃允畋) took over.
- 1978 Dean Huang Yuntian (黃允畋) held the "Hong Kong Six Religious Leaders Forum" with other five religious groups including Islam, Christianity, Buddhism, Catholicism and Taoism.
- 1980 Dean Huang Yuntian (黃允畋) set up the preaching committee and started holding monthly talks and seminars.
- 1992 Huang Yuntian (黃允畋) resigned and recommended Dr. Tang Enjia (湯恩佳) to take over.

=== Development of the academy ===
The development of the Confucian Academy can be divided into three phases. The first is the founding period (1930–1942). Chen Huanzhang (陳煥章), founded the Confucian Academy which focuses on preaching and sharing of the Confucian teachings. Followed by a period of consolidation (1942–1992), when Lu Xiangfu (盧湘父) and Huang Yuntian (黃允畋) have significant achievements in the educational aspects. Confucianism was also included as one of the Hong Kong's six major religions during that time. Then it is the expansion period (1992 - today). The academy put effort in building Confucius statues and temples around the world, sponsoring and encouraging Confucius studies and organizing major seminars.

When the Confucian Academy was first established, funding was extremely difficult. They rented a site for operation. The site at the same time was used to offer free night-schooling for the poor and underprivileged children.

In 1931, the directors of the academy decided to raise funds to purchase the academy site No. 131 Caine Road, with around HKD$50000. A Confucian school was also set up in the premises which was attached to the academy.

In July 1933, the academy officially registered as a limited company, a board of 15 directors was formed to handle its administrative affairs of the academy.

== Recent Activities ==
=== Campaign to make Confucius' birthday as a public holiday in Hong Kong ===
In 2010, Confucian Academy recommended the Hong Kong government to list the birthday of Confucius (27 August of the Chinese Calendar)(農曆八月二十七日) as a public holiday in order to commemorate the Confucius, carry forward the Confucian culture, educate the next generation and enhance the status of Confucianism in Hong Kong.

With the support from the Democratic Alliance for the Betterment and Progress of Hong Kong (民建聯) and six religious groups in Hong Kong, the motion of "Encouraging the government to promote Confucianism and list the Confucius’ Birthday as a public holiday" was nevertheless rejected in the Legislative Council of Hong Kong of Hong Kong on 8 January 2010. Most of the councilors worried that the cancellation of the last day of Easter Holiday for the Confucius’ Birthday would create controversy in the society.

=== Donations to the Hong Kong Institute of Education (HKIEd) ===
In 2009, the Confucian Academy donated HK$1 million to the Centre for Religious and Spirituality Education of the Hong Kong Institute of Education (HKIEd). It aims to promote confucianism to teachers and students and develop their concern for China and global vision.

=== Foreign Visits to promote Confucianism ===
In early April 2008, Dr. Tang Enjia was invited to George Mason University in Fairfax, Virginia to attend the unveiling of a bronze statue of Confucius and to give a speech to the students.

And in mid April, he represented the academy to the United Nations Headquarters in New York to attend a conference with other religious organizations and the United Nations Educational, Scientific and Cultural Organization (UNESCO)

On behalf of the academy, the dean Dr. Tang Enjia and Dr. Hui Chiming, chairman of the academy were invited to a nine-day visit to Japan in late June 2008. They met with the Prime Minister of Japan Yasuo Fukuda, who expressed support for the promotion of the Confucius birthday in Asia. They gave lectures in the J.F.Oberlin University(櫻美林大學) and visited the SBI Holdings Co. Ltd.(SBI Group). They met with the corporation's president Yoshitaka Kitao (北尾吉孝) and had discussions about Confucianism.

== Affiliated Schools ==
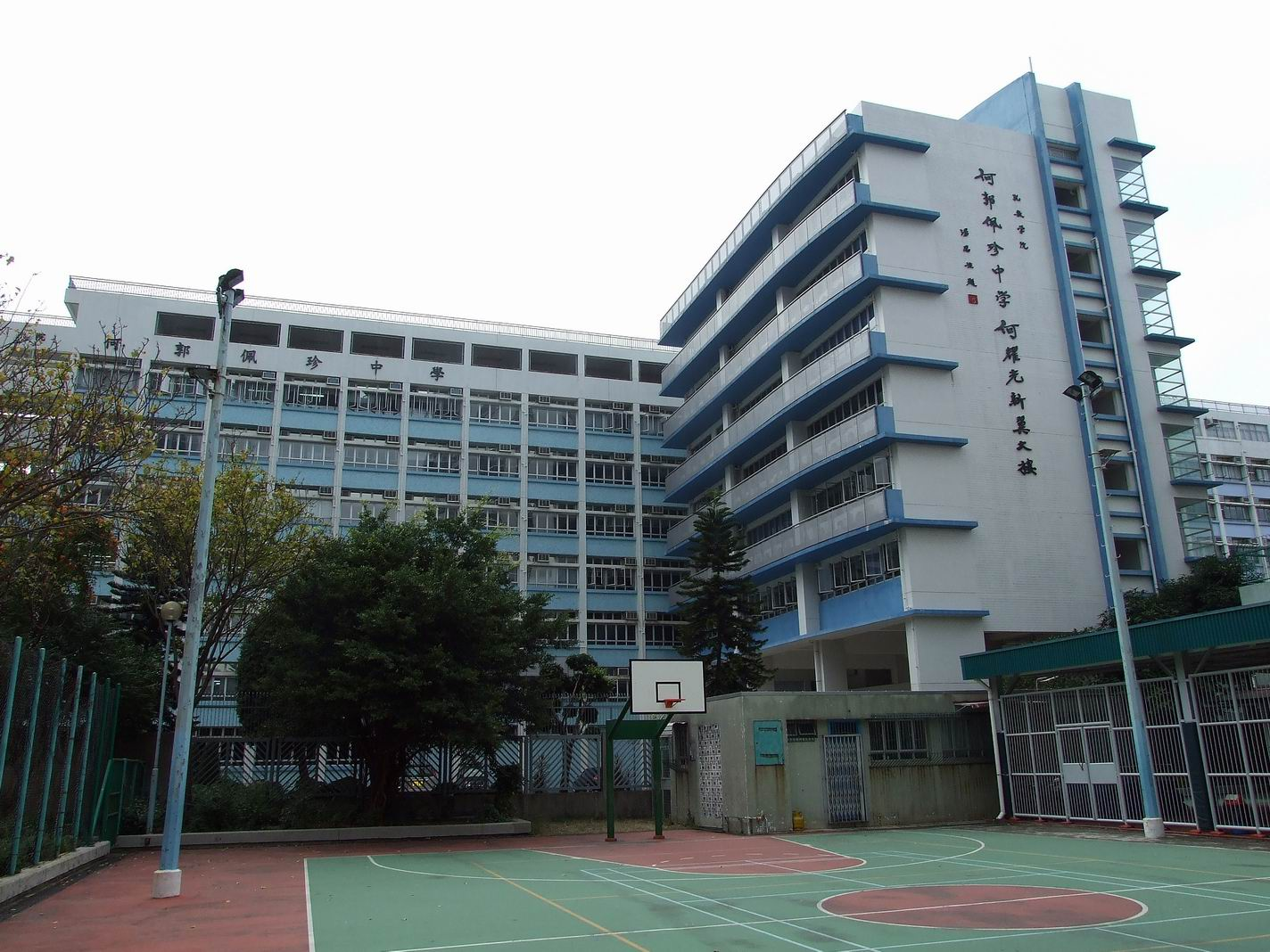
Confucian Ho Kwok Pui Chun College (孔教學院何郭佩珍中學)

=== Secondary schools ===
- Confucian Ho Kwok Pui Chun College (孔教學院何郭佩珍中學)
- Confucian Tai Shing School (孔教學院大成中學)

=== Primary schools ===
- Confucian Sam Lok Chow Mud Wai School (孔教學院三樂周產桅學校)(Closed down)
- Confucian Tai Shing Primary School (孔教學院大成小學)

== Photo gallery ==
President's Office (院長辦公室)

President's Office 1(院長辦公室)

President's Office 3(院長辦公室)

Confucian Tai Shing School (孔教學院大成中學)

Confucian Tai Shing School 1(孔教學院大成中學)

Confucian Tai Shing School 2(孔教學院大成中學)

Confucian Tai Shing School 3(孔教學院大成中學)
