= Confucianism =

Chinese ethical and philosophical system

Chinese name
- Chinese: 儒家
- Literal meaning: Ru school of thought
Transcriptions
Standard Mandarin
- Hanyu Pinyin: Rújiā
- Bopomofo: ㄖㄨˊ ㄐㄧㄚ
- Gwoyeu Romatzyh: Rujia
- Wade–Giles: Ju^{2}-chia^{1}
- Tongyong Pinyin: Rú-jia
- IPA: [ɻǔ.tɕjá]
Wu
- Suzhounese: Zyu^{2}-ka^{1}
Yue: Cantonese
- Yale Romanization: Yùhgāa
- Jyutping: jyu4 gaa1
- IPA: [jy˩ ka˥]
Southern Min
- Tâi-lô: Jû-ka, Lû-ka
Middle Chinese
- Middle Chinese: Nyu-kæ
Old Chinese
- Baxter–Sagart (2014): *no kˤra

Alternative Chinese name
- Chinese: 儒教
- Literal meaning: Ru religious doctrine
Transcriptions
Standard Mandarin
- Hanyu Pinyin: Rújiào
- Bopomofo: ㄖㄨˊ ㄐㄧㄠˋ
- Wade–Giles: Ju^{2}-chiao^{4}
- Tongyong Pinyin: Rú-jiào
- IPA: [ɻǔ.tɕjâʊ]
Yue: Cantonese
- Yale Romanization: Yùhgaau
- Jyutping: jyu4 gaau3
- IPA: [jy˩.kaw˧]

Second alternative Chinese name
- Traditional Chinese: 儒學
- Simplified Chinese: 儒学
- Literal meaning: Ru studies
Transcriptions
Standard Mandarin
- Hanyu Pinyin: Rúxué
- Bopomofo: ㄖㄨˊ ㄒㄩㄝˊ
- Wade–Giles: Ju^{2}-hsüeh^{2}
- Tongyong Pinyin: Rú-syué
- IPA: [ɻǔ.ɕɥě]
Yue: Cantonese
- Yale Romanization: Yùhhohk
- Jyutping: jyu4 hok6
- IPA: [jy˩.hɔk̚˨]

Vietnamese name
- Vietnamese: Nho giáo
- Chữ Hán: 儒教
- Literal meaning: Ru teachings

Korean name
- Hangul: 유교
- Hanja: 儒敎
Transcriptions
- Revised Romanization: Yugyo

Japanese name
- Kanji: 儒教
- Hiragana: じゅきょう
- Katakana: ジュキョウ
Transcriptions
- Romanization: Jukyō
- Kunrei-shiki: Zyukyô

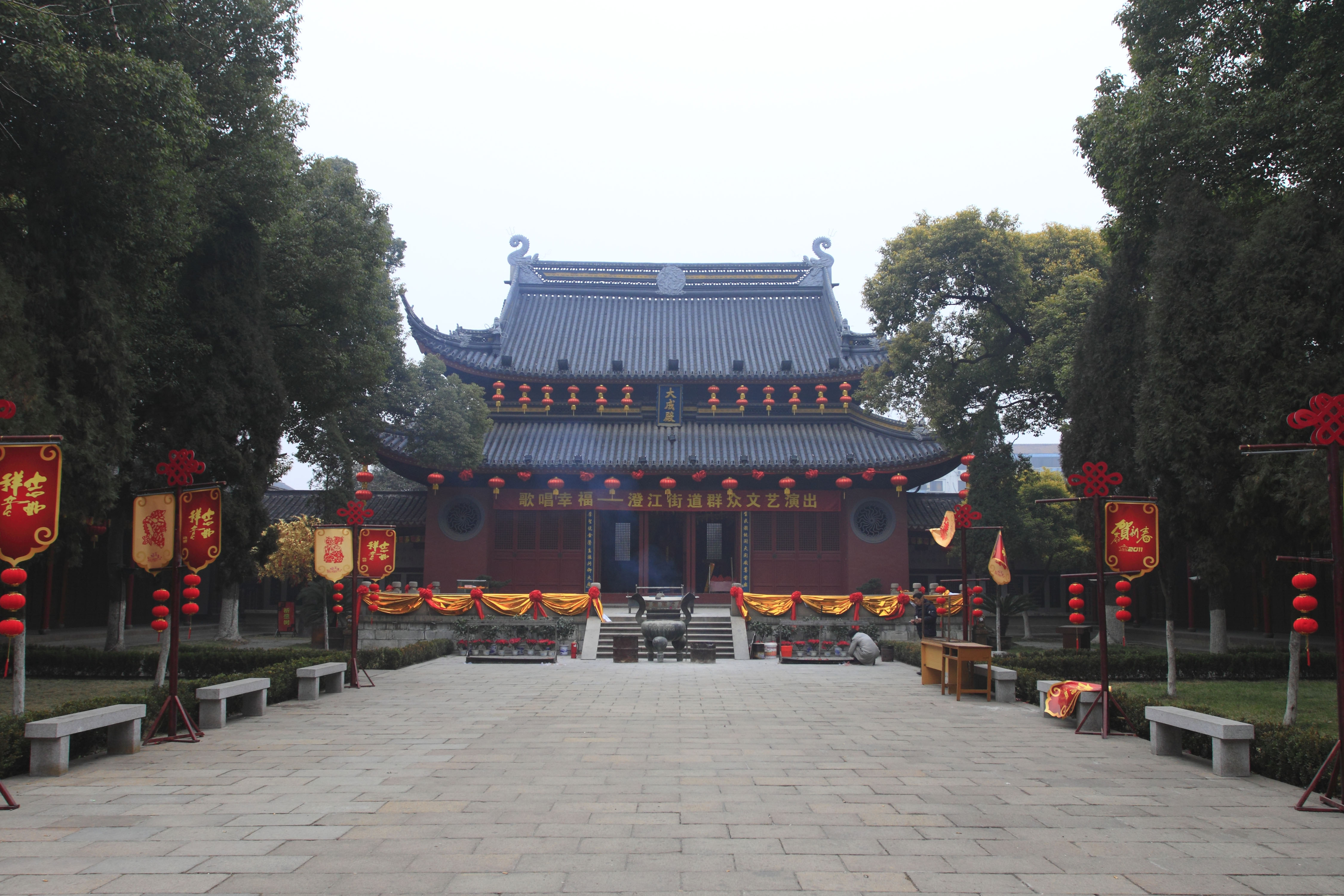
Temple of Confucius of Jiangyin, Wuxi, Jiangsu. It is a wenmiao (文庙), a temple where Confucius is worshipped as Wendi, "God of Culture" (文帝).

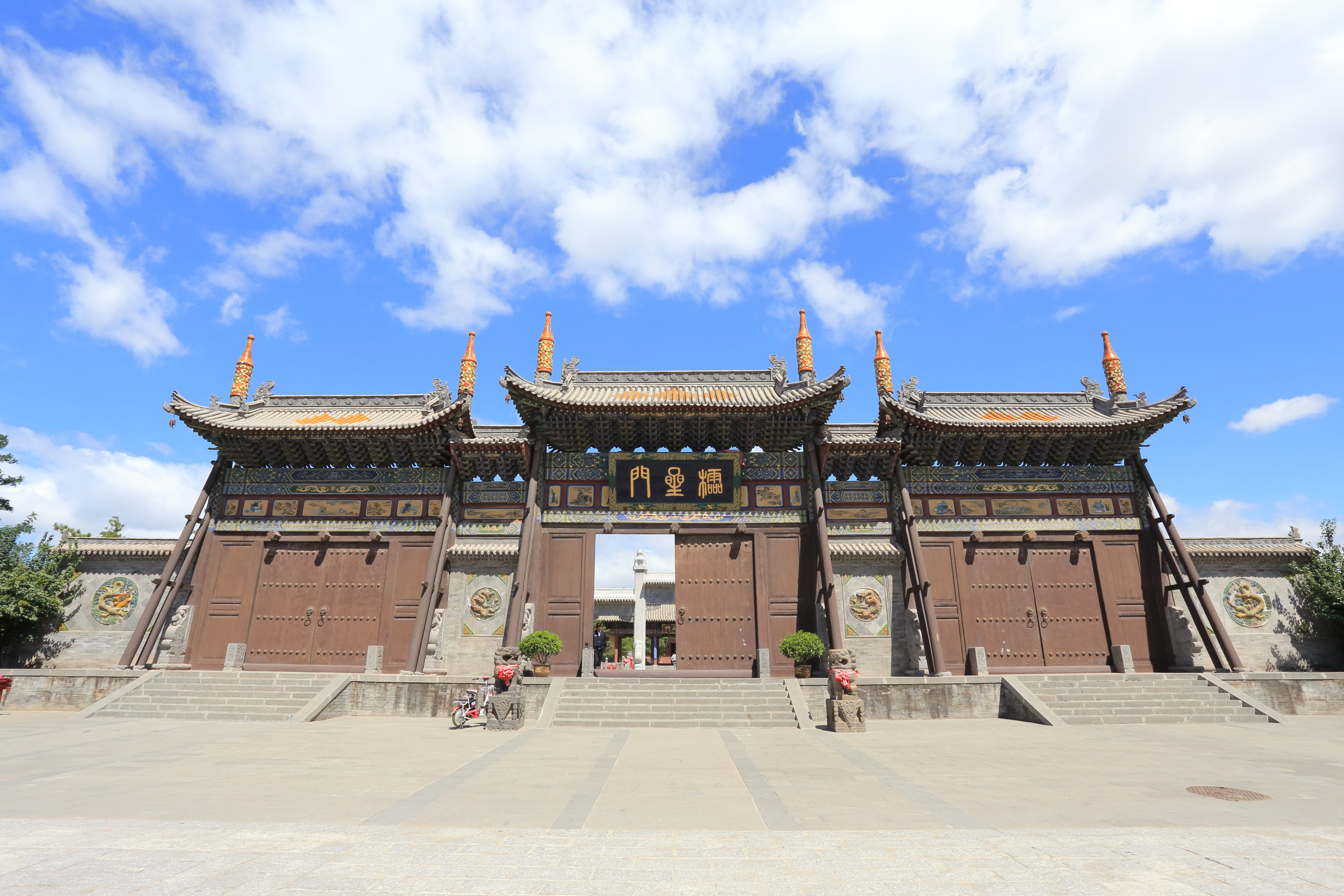
Gates of the wenmiao of Datong, Shanxi

Confucianism, also known as Ruism or Ru classicism, is a system of thought and behavior originating in ancient China, and is variously described as a tradition, philosophy, religion, theory of government, or way of life. Founded by Confucius in the Hundred Schools of Thought era (c. 500 BCE), Confucianism integrates philosophy, ethics, and social governance, with a core focus on virtue, social harmony, and familial responsibility.

Confucianism emphasizes virtue through self-cultivation and communal effort. Key virtues include rén (仁, "benevolence"), yì (義; "righteousness"), lǐ (禮; "propriety"), zhì (智; "wisdom"), and xìn (信; "sincerity"). These values, deeply tied to the notion of tiān (天; "Heaven"), present a worldview where human relationships and social order are manifestations of sacred moral principles. Although Confucianism does not emphasize an omnipotent deity, it upholds tiān as a transcendent moral order.

Confucius regarded himself as a transmitter of cultural values from the preceding Xia, Shang, and Western Zhou dynasties. Suppressed during the Legalist Qin dynasty (c. 200 BCE), Confucianism flourished under the Han dynasty (c. 130 BCE), displacing the proto-Taoist Huang–Lao tradition to become the dominant ideological framework, while blending with the pragmatic teachings of Legalism. The Tang dynasty (c. 600 CE) witnessed a response to the rising influence of Buddhism and Taoism in the development of Neo-Confucianism, a reformulated philosophical system that became central to the imperial examination system and the scholar-official class of the Song dynasty (c. 1000 CE).

The abolition of the imperial examination system in 1905 marked the decline of state-endorsed Confucianism. In the early 20th century, Chinese reformers came to associate Confucianism with China's "Century of Humiliation", and instead embraced alternative ideologies such as Sun Yat-sen's "Three Principles of the People" and later Maoism. Nevertheless, Confucianism endured as a cultural force, influencing East Asian economic and social structures into the modern era. Confucian work ethic was credited with the rise of the East Asian economy in the late twentieth century.

Confucianism remains influential in China, Korea, Japan, Vietnam, and regions with significant Chinese diaspora. A modern Confucian revival has gained momentum in academic and cultural circles, culminating in the establishment of a national Confucian Church in China in 2015, reflecting renewed interest in Confucian ideals as a foundation for social and moral values.

American philosopher Herbert Fingarette describes Confucianism as a philosophical system which regards "the secular as sacred".

== Terminology ==
Large seal

Small seal

Older versions of the grapheme 儒; rú; 'scholar', 'refined one', 'Confucian', 'traditionalist': it is composed of 人; rén; 'person' and 需; xū; 'to await', itself composed of 雨; yǔ; 'rain', 'instruction' and 而; ér; 'sky'. According to Kang Youwei, Hu Shih, and Yao Xinzhong, they were the official shaman-priests (wu) experts in rites and astronomy of the Shang, and later Zhou, dynasty.

There is no term in Chinese which directly corresponds to "Confucianism". The closest catch-all term for Confucianism is the word rú (儒). Its literal meanings in modern Chinese include 'scholar', 'learned', or 'refined man'. In Old Chinese the word had a distinct set of meanings, including 'to tame', 'to mould', 'to educate', and 'to refine'. Several different terms, some of which with modern origin, are used in different situations to express different facets of Confucianism, including:

- 儒家; Rújiā – "the ru school of thought";
- 儒教; Rújiào – "ru religious doctrine";
- 儒学; 儒學; Rúxué – "ru studies";
- 孔教; Kǒngjiào – "Confucius's religious doctrine";
- 孔家店; Kǒngjiādiàn – "Confucius's family's business", a pejorative phrase used during the New Culture Movement and the Cultural Revolution.

The terms that use ru do not use the name "Confucius" at all, but instead focus on the ideal of the Confucian man. The use of the term "Confucianism" has been avoided by some modern scholars, who favor "Ruism" and "Ruists" instead. Robert Eno argues that the term has been "burdened ... with the ambiguities and irrelevant traditional associations". Ruism, as he states, is more faithful to the original Chinese name for the school.

The term "Traditionalist" has been suggested by David Schaberg to emphasize the connection to the past, its standards, and inherited forms, in which Confucius himself placed so much importance. This translation of the word ru is followed by e.g. Yuri Pines.

According to Zhou Youguang, ru originally referred to shamanic methods of holding rites and existed before Confucius's times, but with Confucius it came to mean devotion to propagating such teachings to bring civilisation to the people.

=== Five Classics and the Confucian vision ===
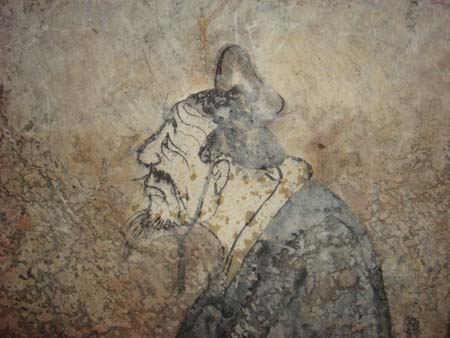
Confucius in a fresco from a Western Han tomb in Dongping, Shandong

Traditionally, Confucius was thought to be the author or editor of the Five Classics which were the basic texts of Confucianism, all edited into their received versions around 500 years later by Imperial Librarian Liu Xin. The scholar Yao Xinzhong allows that there are good reasons to believe that Confucian classics took shape in the hands of Confucius, but that "nothing can be taken for granted in the matter of the early versions of the classics". The sixth classic similar to the Classic of Poetry was the Classic of Music. It was lost during the Han dynasty. Music carried an invaluable tool to induce focus in performing rituals. These were the internal (music) and external (rites) keys to harmonizing society. Yao suggests that most modern scholars hold the "pragmatic" view that Confucius and his followers did not intend to create a system of classics, but nonetheless "contributed to their formation".

The scholar Tu Weiming explains these classics as embodying "five visions" which underlie the development of Confucianism:

- I Ching (Classic of Change or Book of Changes), generally held to be the earliest of the classics, shows a metaphysical vision which combines divinatory art with numerological technique and ethical insight; philosophy of change sees cosmos as interaction between the two energies yin and yang; universe always shows organismic unity and dynamism.
- Classic of Poetry or Book of Songs is the earliest anthology of Chinese poems and songs, with the earliest strata antedating the Zhou conquest. It shows the poetic vision in the belief that poetry and music convey common human feelings and mutual responsiveness.
- Book of Documents or Book of History is a compilation of speeches of major figures and records of events in ancient times, embodying the political vision and addressing the kingly way in terms of the ethical foundation for humane government. The documents show the sagacity, filial piety, and work ethic of mythical sage-emperors Yao, Shun, and Yu, who established a political culture which was based on responsibility and trust. Their virtue formed a covenant of social harmony which did not depend on punishment or coercion.
- Book of Rites describes the social forms, administration, and ceremonial rites of the Zhou dynasty. This social vision defined society not as an adversarial system based on contractual relations but as a network of kinship groups bound by cultural identity and ritual practice, socially responsible for one another and the transmission of proper antique forms. The four functional occupations are cooperative (farmer, scholar, artisan, merchant).
- Spring and Autumn Annals chronicles the period to which it gives its name, Spring and Autumn period (771–481 BC), from the perspective of Confucius's home state of Lu. These events emphasise the significance of collective memory for communal self-identification, for reanimating the old is the best way to attain the new.

== Doctrines ==
=== Theory and theology ===
Zhou dynasty oracular version of the grapheme for Tian, representing a man with a head informed by the north celestial pole

Confucianism revolves around the pursuit of the unity of the individual self and tian ("heaven"), or the relationship between humanity and heaven. The principle or way of Heaven (tian li or tian tao) is the order of the world and the source of divine authority. Tian li or tian tao is monistic, meaning that it is singular and indivisible. Individuals may realise their humanity and become one with Heaven through the contemplation of such order. This transformation of the self is extended to family and society to create a harmonious community. Joël Thoraval studied Confucianism as a diffused civil religion in contemporary China, finding that it expresses itself in the widespread worship of five cosmological entities: Heaven and Earth (地; dì), the sovereign or the government (君; jūn), ancestors (親; qīn), and masters (師; shī).

According to the scholar Stephan Feuchtwang, in Chinese cosmology, which is not merely Confucian but shared by many Chinese religions, "the universe creates itself out of a primary chaos of material energy" (hundun and qi), and is organized through the polarity of yin and yang that characterises any thing and life. Creation is therefore a continuous ordering; it is not creation ex nihilo. "Yin and yang are the invisible and visible, the receptive and the active, the unshaped and the shaped; they characterise the yearly cycle (winter and summer), the landscape (shady and bright), the sexes (female and male), and even sociopolitical history (disorder and order). Confucianism is concerned with finding "middle ways" between yin and yang at every new configuration of the world."

Confucianism conciliates both the inner and outer polarities of spiritual cultivation—that is to say self-cultivation and world redemption—in the ideal of "sageliness within and kingliness without". Ren, translated as "humaneness" or the essence proper of a human being, is the character of compassionate mind; it is the virtue endowed by Heaven and at the same time the means by which a person may achieve oneness with Heaven by comprehending their origin in Heaven, and therefore divine essence. In his work The Book of Great Unity (大同書), late Qing dynasty reformer Kang Youwei considered ren as the means "to form one body with all things" and one can find ren "when the self and others are not separated... and when compassion is aroused".

"Lord Heaven" and "Jade Emperor" were terms for a Confucianist supreme deity who was an anthropomorphized tian, and some conceptions of it thought of the two names as synonymous.

==== Tian and the gods ====
Like other symbols such as the sauwastika, 卍 (wàn; 'all things') in Chinese, the Mesopotamian dingir or anu 𒀭𒀭, and also the Chinese 巫; wu; 'shaman' (in Shang script represented by a graph resembling the cross potent ☩), Tian refers to the northern celestial pole (北極; běijí), the pivot and the vault of the sky with its spinning constellations. Here is an approximate representation of the tiānmén (天門; 'gate of heaven'). or tiānshū (天樞; 'pivot of heaven') as the precessional north celestial pole, with α Ursae Minoris as the pole star, with the spinning Chariot constellations in the four phases of time. According to Reza Assasi's theories, the 卍 may not only be centred in the current precessional pole at α Ursae Minoris, but also very near to the north ecliptic pole if Draco (天龙; 天龍; Tiānlóng) is conceived as one of its two beams. (Note: Whether centred in the change-ful precessional north celestial pole or in the fixed north ecliptic pole, the spinning constellations draw the 卍 symbol around the centre.)

Tian, a key concept in Chinese thought, refers to the God of Heaven, the northern culmen of the skies and its spinning stars, earthly nature and its laws which come from Heaven, to 'Heaven and Earth' (that is, "all things"), and to the awe-inspiring forces beyond human control. There are so many uses in Chinese thought that it is impossible to give a single English translation.

Confucius used the term in a mystical way. He wrote in the Analects (7.23) that tian gave him life, and that tian watched and judged (6.28; 9.12). In 9.5 Confucius says that a person may know the movements of tian, and this provides with the sense of having a special place in the universe. In 17.19 Confucius says that tian spoke to him, though not in words. The scholar Ronnie Littlejohn warns that tian was not to be interpreted as a personal god comparable to that of the Abrahamic faiths, in the sense of an otherworldly or transcendent creator. Rather it is similar to what Taoists meant by Dao: "the way things are" or "the regularities of the world", which Stephan Feuchtwang equates with the ancient Greek concept of physis, "nature" as the generation and regenerations of things and of the moral order. Tian may also be compared to the Brahman of Hindu and Vedic traditions. The scholar Promise Hsu, in the wake of Robert B. Louden, explained 17:19 ("What does Tian ever say? Yet there are four seasons going round and there are the hundred things coming into being. What does Tian say?") as implying that even though Tian is not a "speaking person", it constantly "does" through the rhythms of nature, and communicates "how human beings ought to live and act", at least to those who have learnt to carefully listen to it.

Duanmu Ci, a disciple of Confucius, said that Tian had set the master on the path to become a wise man (9.6). In 7.23 Confucius says that he has no doubt left that Tian gave him life, and from it he had developed right virtue (de). In 8.19, he says that the lives of the sages are interwoven with Tian.

Regarding personal gods (shen, energies who emanate from and reproduce Tian) enliving nature, in the Analects Confucius says that it is appropriate (yi) for people to worship (敬; jìng) them, although only through proper rites (li), implying respect of positions and discretion. Confucius himself was a ritual and sacrificial master.

Answering to a disciple who asked whether it is better to sacrifice to the god of the stove or to the god of the family (a popular saying), in 3.13 Confucius says that in order to appropriately pray to gods, one should first know and respect Heaven. In 3.12, he explains that religious rituals produce meaningful experiences, and one has to offer sacrifices in person, acting in presence, otherwise "it is the same as not having sacrificed at all". Rites and sacrifices to the gods have an ethical importance: they generate good life, because taking part in them leads to the overcoming of the self. Analects 10.11 tells that Confucius always took a small part of his food and placed it on the sacrificial bowls as an offering to his ancestors.

Some Confucian movements worship Confucius, although not as a supreme being or anything else approaching the power of tian or the tao, and/or gods from Chinese folk religion. These movements are not a part of mainstream Confucianism, although the boundary between Chinese folk religion and Confucianism can be blurred.

Other movements, such as Mohism which was later absorbed by Taoism, developed a more theistic idea of Heaven. Feuchtwang explains that the difference between Confucianism and Taoism primarily lies in the fact that the former focuses on the realisation of the starry order of Heaven in human society, while the latter on the contemplation of the Dao which spontaneously arises in nature. However, Confucianism does venerate many aspects of nature and also respects various tao, as well as what Confucius saw as the main tao, the "[Way] of Heaven."

The Way of Heaven involves "lifelong and sincere devotion to traditional cultural forms" and wu wei, "a state of spontaneous harmony between individual inclinations and the sacred Way".

Kelly James Clark argued that Confucius himself saw Tian as an anthropomorphic god that Clark hypothetically refers to as "Heavenly Supreme Emperor", although most other scholars on Confucianism disagree with this view.

=== Social morality and ethics ===
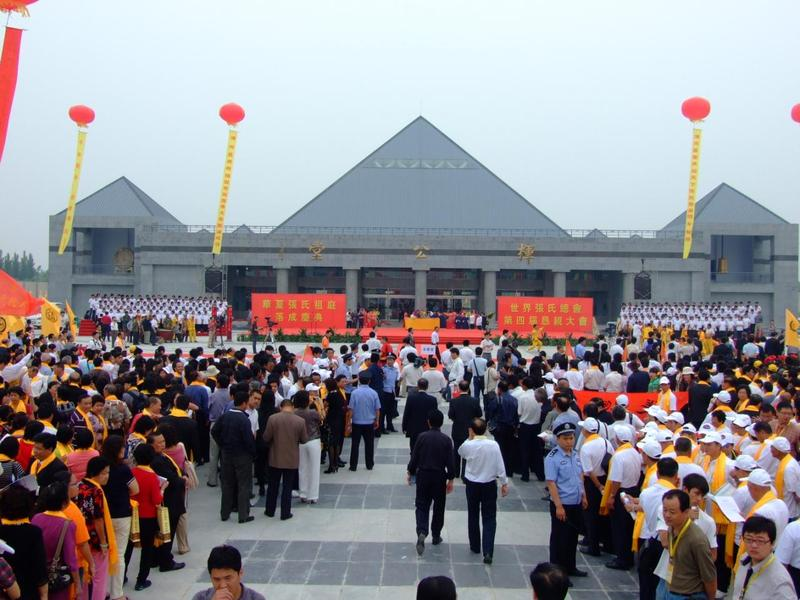
Worship at the Great Temple of Lord Zhang Hui (张挥公大殿; Zhāng Huī gōng dàdiàn), the cathedral ancestral shrine of the Zhang lineage corporation, at their ancestral home in Qinghe, Hebei

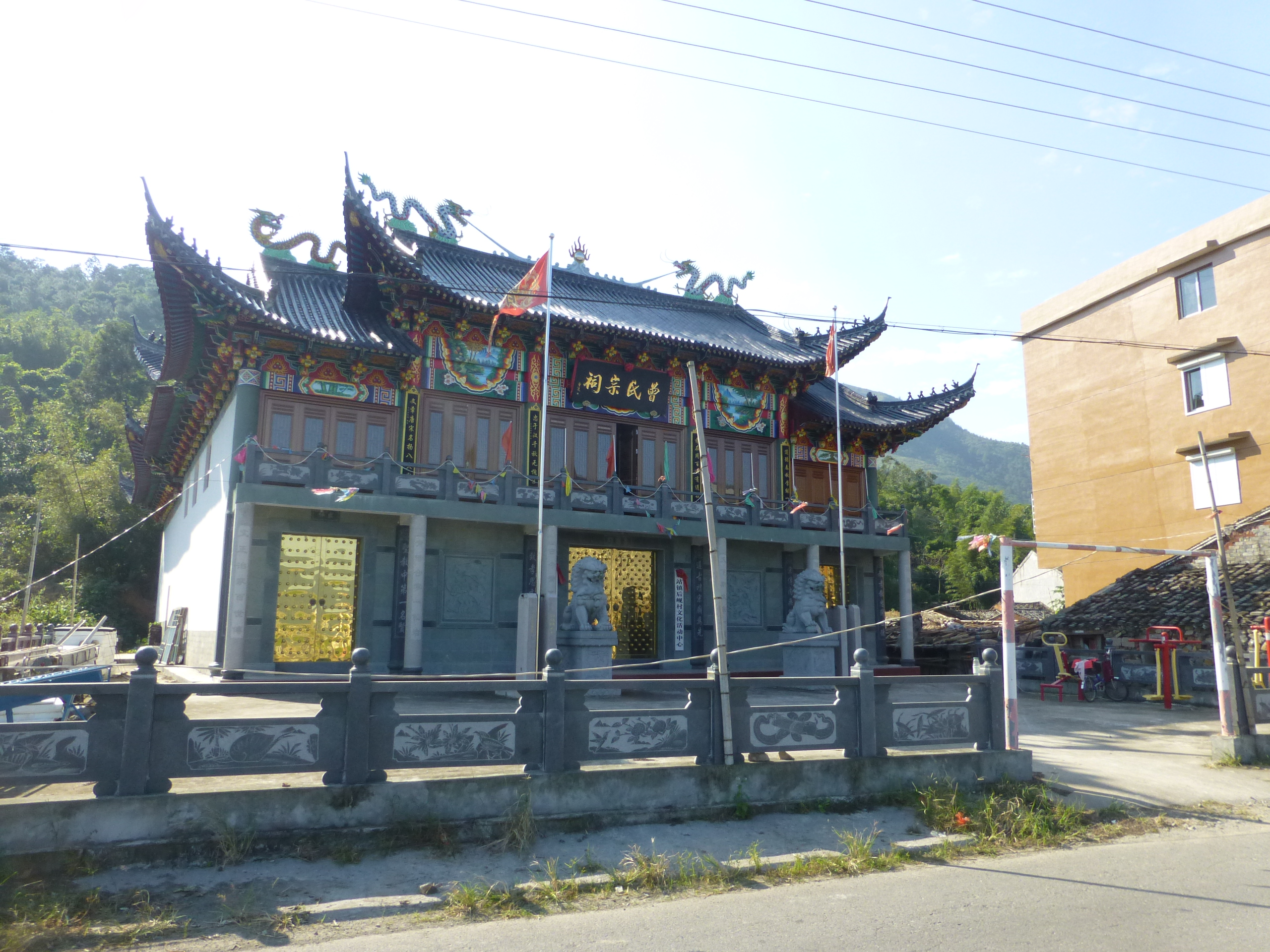
Ancestral temple of the Zeng lineage and Houxian village cultural centre, Cangnan, Zhejiang

As explained by Stephan Feuchtwang, the order coming from Heaven preserves the world, and has to be followed by humanity finding a "middle way" between yin and yang forces in each new configuration of reality. Social harmony or morality is identified as patriarchy, which is expressed in the worship of ancestors and deified progenitors in the male line, at ancestral shrines.

Confucian ethical codes are described as humanistic. They may be practiced by all the members of a society. Confucian ethics is characterised by the promotion of virtues, encompassed by the Five Constants, elaborated by Confucian scholars out of the inherited tradition during the Han dynasty. The Five Constants are:

- Ren (benevolence, humaneness)
- Yi (righteousness, justice)
- Li (propriety, rites)
- Zhi (智; zhì: wisdom, knowledge)
- Xin (sincerity, faithfulness)

These are accompanied by the classical four virtues (四字; sìzì), one of which (Yi) is also included among the Five Constants:

- Yi (see above)
- Loyalty (忠; zhōng)
- Filial piety (孝; xiào)
- Continence (节; 節; jié)

There are many other traditionally Confucian values, such as 'honesty' (诚; chéng), 'bravery' (勇; yǒng), 'incorruptibility' (廉; lián), 'kindness', 'forgiveness' (恕; shù), a 'sense of right and wrong' (耻; chǐ), 'gentleness' (温; wēn), 'kindheartenedness' (良; liáng), 'respect' (恭; gōng), 'frugality' (俭; jiǎn), and 'modesty' (让; ràng)).

==== Ren ====
Ren (仁 ) is the highest Confucian virtue meaning the good quality of a virtuous human when reaching for higher ideals or when being altruistic. According to Confucius, Ren encompasses benevolence, trustworthiness, courage, compassion, empathy, and reciprocity. It is considered the essence of the human being endowed by Heaven, and the means by which someone may act according to the principle of Heaven and become one with it.

Ren is expressed through interpersonal relationships and can be cultivated through the observance of proper Li. Li, or ritual, guides people's behaviors in nurturing and expressing Ren. Li regulates the fundamental human relationships between parents and kids, spouses, siblings, friends, and set the foundation to a harmonious society. Yan Hui, Confucius's most outstanding student, once asked his master to describe the criteria of Ren. Confucius replied, "If contrary to ritual, do not look; if contrary to ritual, do not listen; if contrary to ritual, do not speak; if contrary to ritual, do not act."

Ren is also a central principle in Confucian political theory: a ruler with the Mandate of Heaven is one of great virtue, who leads by moral example and prioritizes the well-being of the people.

==== Rite and centring ====
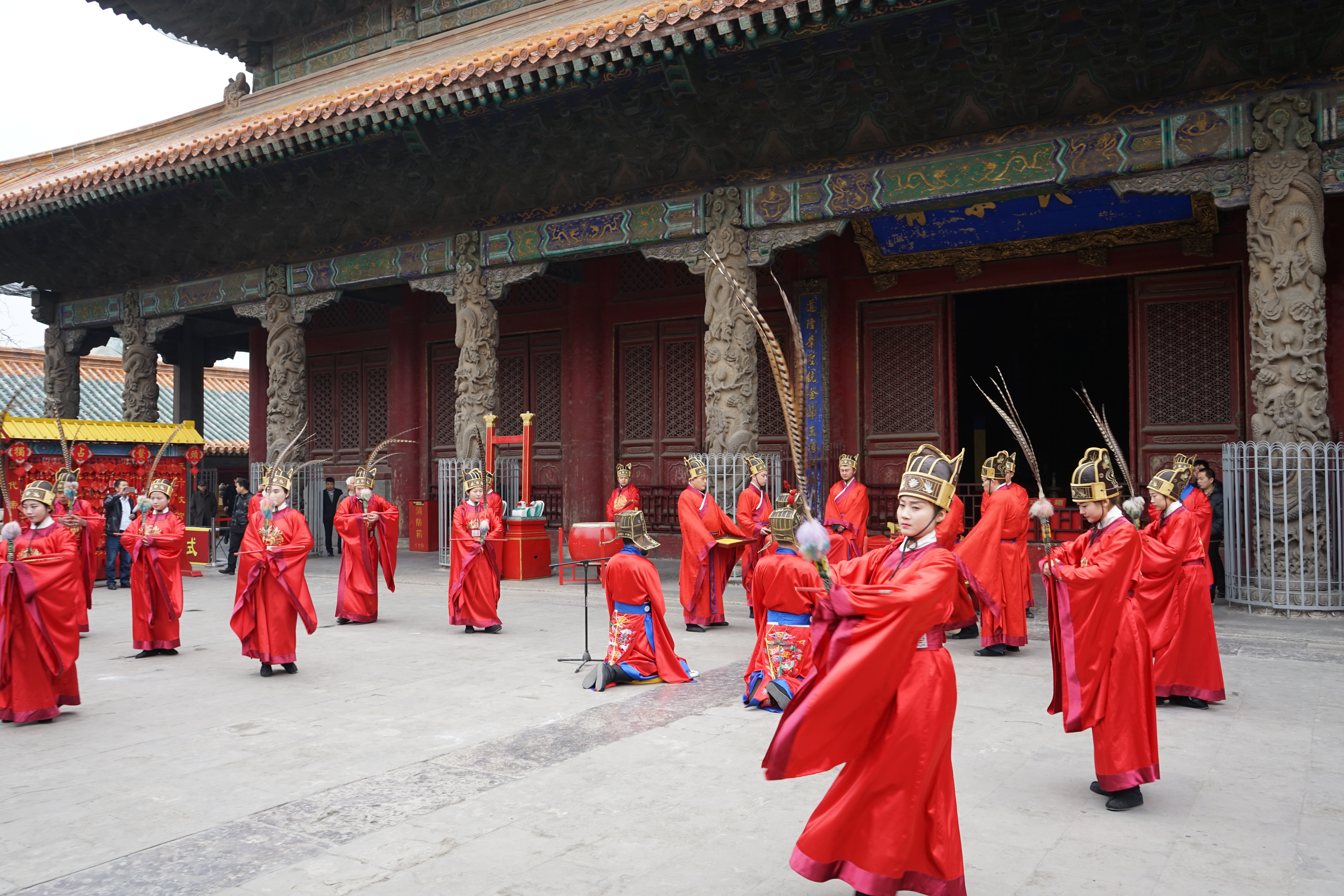
Confucian ritual ceremony held at Qufu Confucius temple in Shandong, China.

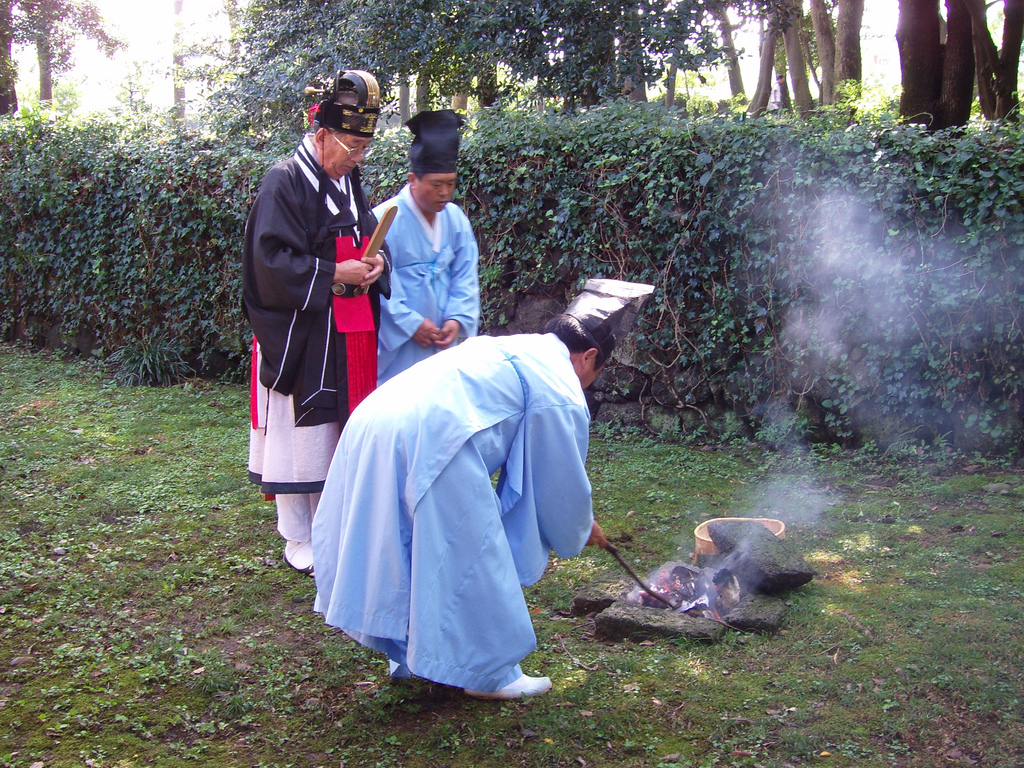
Korean Confucian rite in Jeju

Li (礼; 禮) is a word which finds its most extensive use in Confucian and post-Confucian Chinese philosophy. Li can be translated as 'rite' or ritual, when referring to its realization in the context of human social behavior it has also been translated as 'customs', 'measures' and 'rules', among other terms. Li also means religious rites which establish relations between humanity and the gods.

According to Stephan Feuchtwang, rites are conceived as "what makes the invisible visible", making possible for humans to cultivate the underlying order of nature. Correctly performed rituals move society in alignment with earthly and heavenly (astral) forces, establishing the harmony of the three realms—Heaven, Earth and humanity. This practice is defined as "centering" (央; yāng or 中; zhōng). Among all things of creation, humans themselves are "central" because they have the ability to cultivate and centre natural forces.

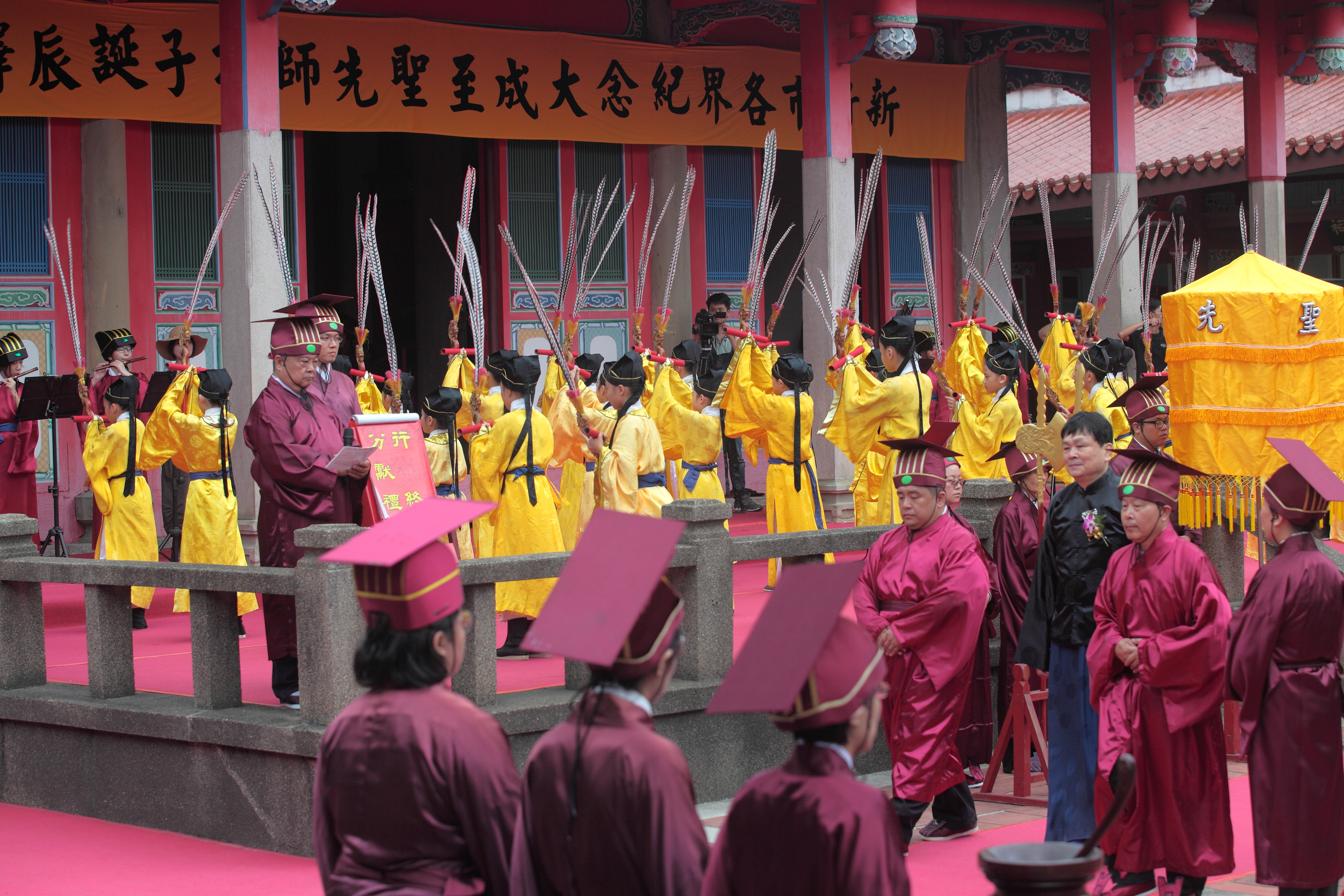
Confucian rite held at Teachers' Day in Taiwan.

Li embodies the entire web of interaction between humanity, human objects, and nature. Confucius includes in his discussions of li such diverse topics as learning, tea drinking, titles, mourning, and governance. Xunzi cites "songs and laughter, weeping and lamentation ... rice and millet, fish and meat ... the wearing of ceremonial caps, embroidered robes, and patterned silks, or of fasting clothes and mourning clothes ... spacious rooms and secluded halls, soft mats, couches and benches" as vital parts of the fabric of li.

Confucius envisioned proper government being guided by the principles of li. Some Confucians proposed that all human beings may pursue perfection by learning and practising li. Overall, Confucians believe that governments should place more emphasis on li and rely much less on penal punishment when they govern.

==== Loyalty ====
Loyalty (忠; zhōng) is particularly relevant for the social class to which most of Confucius's students belonged, because the most important way for an ambitious young scholar to become a prominent official was to enter a ruler's civil service.

Confucius himself did not propose that "might makes right", but rather that a superior should be obeyed because of his moral rectitude. In addition, loyalty does not mean subservience to authority. This is because reciprocity is demanded from the superior as well. As Confucius stated "a prince should employ his minister according to the rules of propriety; ministers should serve their prince with faithfulness (loyalty)."

Similarly, Mencius also said that "when the prince regards his ministers as his hands and feet, his ministers regard their prince as their belly and heart; when he regards them as his dogs and horses, they regard him as another man; when he regards them as the ground or as grass, they regard him as a robber and an enemy." Moreover, Mencius indicated that if the ruler is incompetent, he should be replaced. If the ruler is evil, then the people have the right to overthrow him. A good Confucian is also expected to remonstrate with his superiors when necessary. At the same time, a proper Confucian ruler should also accept his ministers' advice, as this will help him govern the realm better.

In later ages, however, emphasis was often placed more on the obligations of the ruled to the ruler, and less on the ruler's obligations to the ruled. Like filial piety, loyalty was often subverted by the autocratic regimes in China. Nonetheless, throughout the ages, many Confucians continued to fight against unrighteous superiors and rulers. Many of these Confucians suffered and sometimes died because of their conviction and action. During the Ming-Qing era, prominent Confucians such as Wang Yangming promoted individuality and independent thinking as a counterweight to subservience to authority. The famous thinker Huang Zongxi also strongly criticised the autocratic nature of the imperial system and wanted to keep imperial power in check.

Many Confucians also realised that loyalty and filial piety have the potential of coming into conflict with one another. This may be true especially in times of social chaos, such as during the period of the Ming-Qing transition.

==== Filial piety ====
Fourteenth of The Twenty-four Filial Exemplars

In Confucian philosophy, "filial piety" (孝; xiào) is a virtue of respect for one's parents and ancestors, and of the hierarchies within society: father–son, elder–junior and male–female. The Confucian classic Xiaojing ("Book of Piety"), thought to be written during the Qin or Han dynasties, has historically been the authoritative source on the Confucian tenet of xiao. The book, a conversation between Confucius and his disciple Zeng Shen, is about how to set up a good society using the principle of xiao.

In more general terms, filial piety means to be good to one's parents; to take care of one's parents; to engage in good conduct not just towards parents but also outside the home so as to bring a good name to one's parents and ancestors; to perform the duties of one's job well so as to obtain the material means to support parents as well as carry out sacrifices to the ancestors; not be rebellious; show love, respect and support; the wife in filial piety must obey her husband absolutely and take care of the whole family wholeheartedly. display courtesy; ensure male heirs, uphold fraternity among brothers; wisely advise one's parents, including dissuading them from moral unrighteousness, for blindly following the parents' wishes is not considered to be xiao; display sorrow for their sickness and death; and carry out sacrifices after their death.

Filial piety is considered a key virtue in Chinese culture, and it is the main concern of a large number of stories. One of the most famous collections of such stories is "The Twenty-four Filial Exemplars". These stories depict how children exercised their filial piety in the past. While China has always had a diversity of religious beliefs, filial piety has been common to almost all of them; historian Hugh D.R. Baker calls respect for the family the only element common to almost all Chinese believers.

=== Relationships ===
Social harmony results in part from every individual knowing his or her place in the natural order, and playing his or her part well. Reciprocity or responsibility (renqing) extends beyond filial piety and involves the entire network of social relations, even the respect for rulers. This is shown in the story where Duke Jing of Qi asks Confucius about government, by which he meant proper administration so as to bring social harmony:

齊景公問政於孔子。孔子對曰：君君，臣臣，父父，子子。
The duke Jing, of Qi, asked Confucius about government. Confucius replied, "There is government, when the prince is prince, and the minister is minister; when the father is father, and the son is son."

— Analects 12.11 (Legge translation).

Particular duties arise from one's particular situation in relation to others. The individual stands simultaneously in several different relationships with different people: as a junior in relation to parents and elders, and as a senior in relation to younger siblings, students, and others. While juniors are considered in Confucianism to owe their seniors reverence, seniors also have duties of benevolence and concern toward juniors. The same is true with the husband and wife relationship where the husband needs to show benevolence towards his wife and the wife needs to respect the husband in return. This theme of mutuality still exists in East Asian cultures even to this day.

The Five Bonds are: ruler to ruled, father to son, husband to wife, elder brother to younger brother, friend to friend. Specific duties were prescribed to each of the participants in these sets of relationships. Such duties are also extended to the dead, where the living stand as sons to their deceased family. The only relationship where respect for elders is not stressed was the friend to friend relationship, where mutual equal respect is emphasised instead. All these duties take the practical form of prescribed rituals, for instance wedding and death rituals.

=== Junzi ===
The junzi is a Chinese philosophical term often translated as "gentleman" or "superior person." Junzi, which literally means "son of a lord", was redefined by Confucius in the Analects to describe a person of noble character and ethical virtue.

In Confucianism, the sage or wise is the ideal personality; however, it is very hard to become one of them. Confucius created the model of junzi, which may be achieved by any individual through the discipline of one's minds and actions. Song dynasty Confucian philosopher Zhu Xi defined junzi as second only to the sage. There are many characteristics of the junzi: he may live in poverty, he does more and speaks less, he is loyal, obedient and knowledgeable. The junzi disciplines himself. Ren is fundamental to become a junzi.

As the potential leader of a nation, a son of the ruler is raised to have a superior ethical and moral position while gaining inner peace through his virtue. The junzi enforces his rule over his subjects by acting virtuously himself. It is thought that his pure virtue would lead others to follow his example. The ultimate goal is that the government behaves much like a family, the junzi being a beacon of filial piety. To Confucius, the junzi sustained the functions of government and social stratification through his ethical values. Despite its literal meaning, any righteous man willing to improve himself may become a junzi.

In contrast to the junzi, the xiaoren (小人; xiăorén ), small-minded or morally inferior people, do not grasp the value of virtues and seeks only immediate gains. The petty person is egotistic and does not consider the consequences of his action in the overall scheme of things. Should the ruler be surrounded by xiaoren as opposed to junzi, his governance and his people will suffer due to their small-mindness. Examples of such xiaoren individuals may range from those who continually indulge in sensual and emotional pleasures all day to the politician who is interested merely in power and fame; neither sincerely aims for the long-term benefit of others.

=== Rectification of names ===
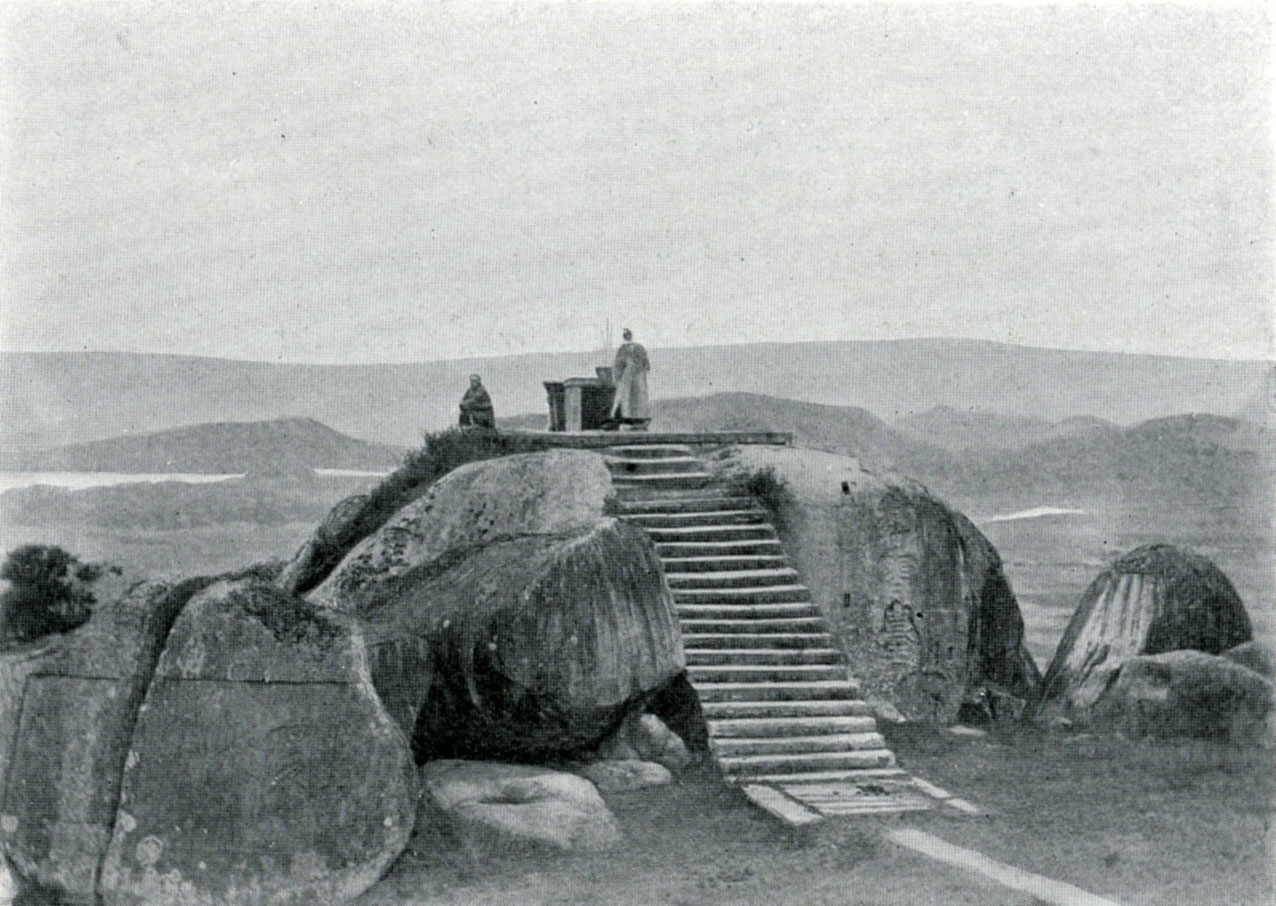
Priest paying homage to Confucius's tablet, c. 1900

Confucius believed that social disorder often stemmed from failure to perceive, understand, and deal with reality. Fundamentally, then, social disorder may stem from the failure to call things by their proper names, and his solution to this was the "rectification of names" (正名; zhèngmíng). He gave an explanation of this concept to one of his disciples:

Zi-lu said, "The vassal of Wei has been waiting for you, in order with you to administer the government. What will you consider the first thing to be done?"
The Master replied, "What is necessary to rectify names."
"So! indeed!" said Zi-lu. "You are wide off the mark! Why must there be such rectification?"
The Master said, "How uncultivated you are, Yu! The superior man [Junzi] cannot care about the everything, just as he cannot go to check all himself!
If names be not correct, language is not in accordance with the truth of things.
If language be not in accordance with the truth of things, affairs cannot be carried on to success.
When affairs cannot be carried on to success, proprieties and music do not flourish.
When proprieties and music do not flourish, punishments will not be properly awarded.
When punishments are not properly awarded, the people do not know how to move hand or foot.
Therefore a superior man considers it necessary that the names he uses may be spoken appropriately, and also that what he speaks may be carried out appropriately. What the superior man requires is just that in his words there may be nothing incorrect."
(Analects XIII, 3, tr. Legge)

Xunzi chapter (22) "On the Rectification of Names" claims the ancient sage-kings chose names (名; míng) that directly corresponded with actualities (實; shí), but later generations confused terminology, coined new nomenclature, and thus could no longer distinguish right from wrong. Since social harmony is of utmost importance, without the proper rectification of names, society would essentially crumble and "undertakings [would] not [be] completed."

== History ==
=== Metaphysical antecedents ===
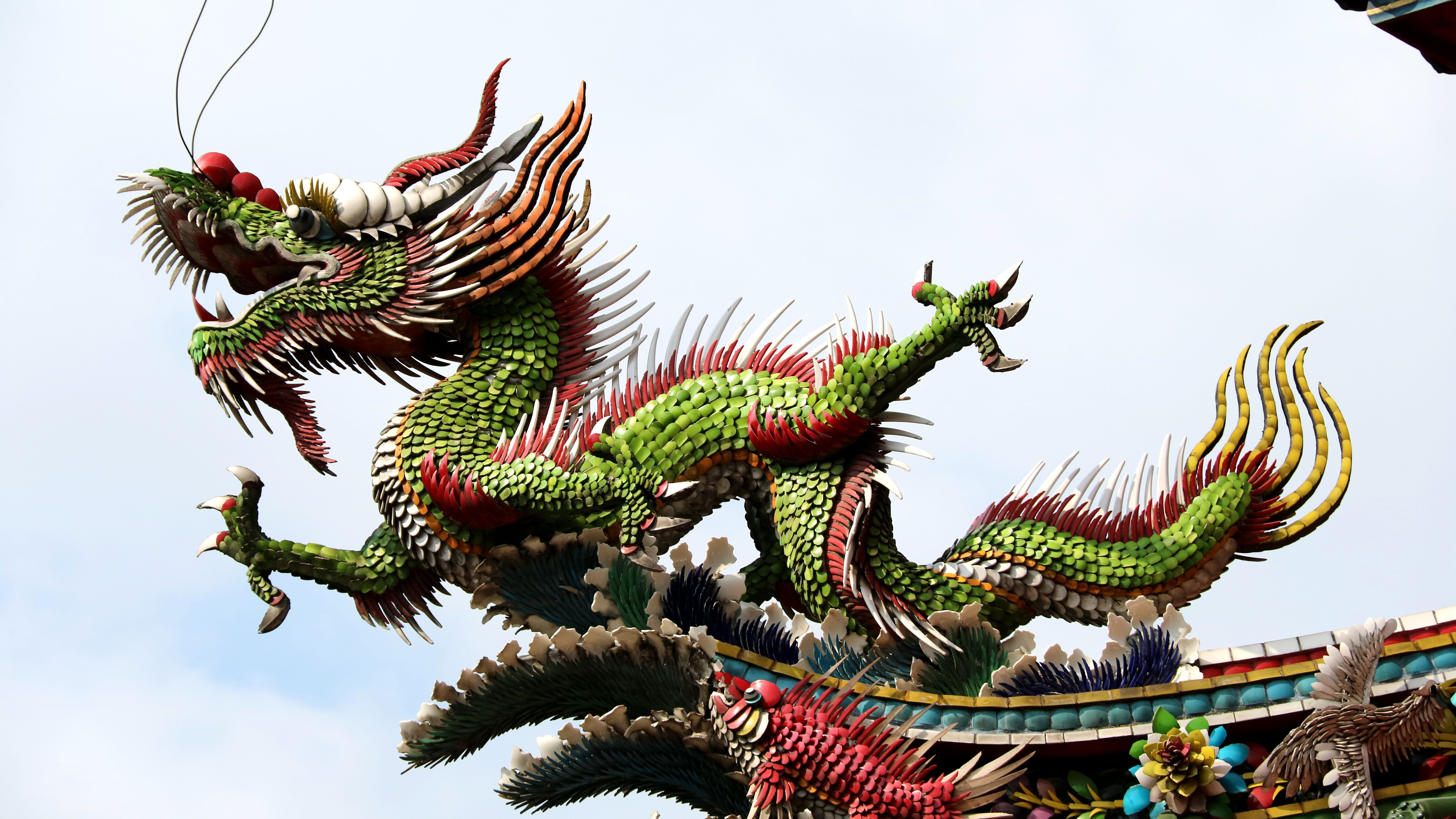
The dragon is one of the oldest symbols of Chinese religious culture. It symbolises the supreme godhead, Di or Tian, at the north ecliptic pole, around which it coils itself as the homonymous constellation. It is a symbol of the "protean" supreme power which has in itself both yin and yang.

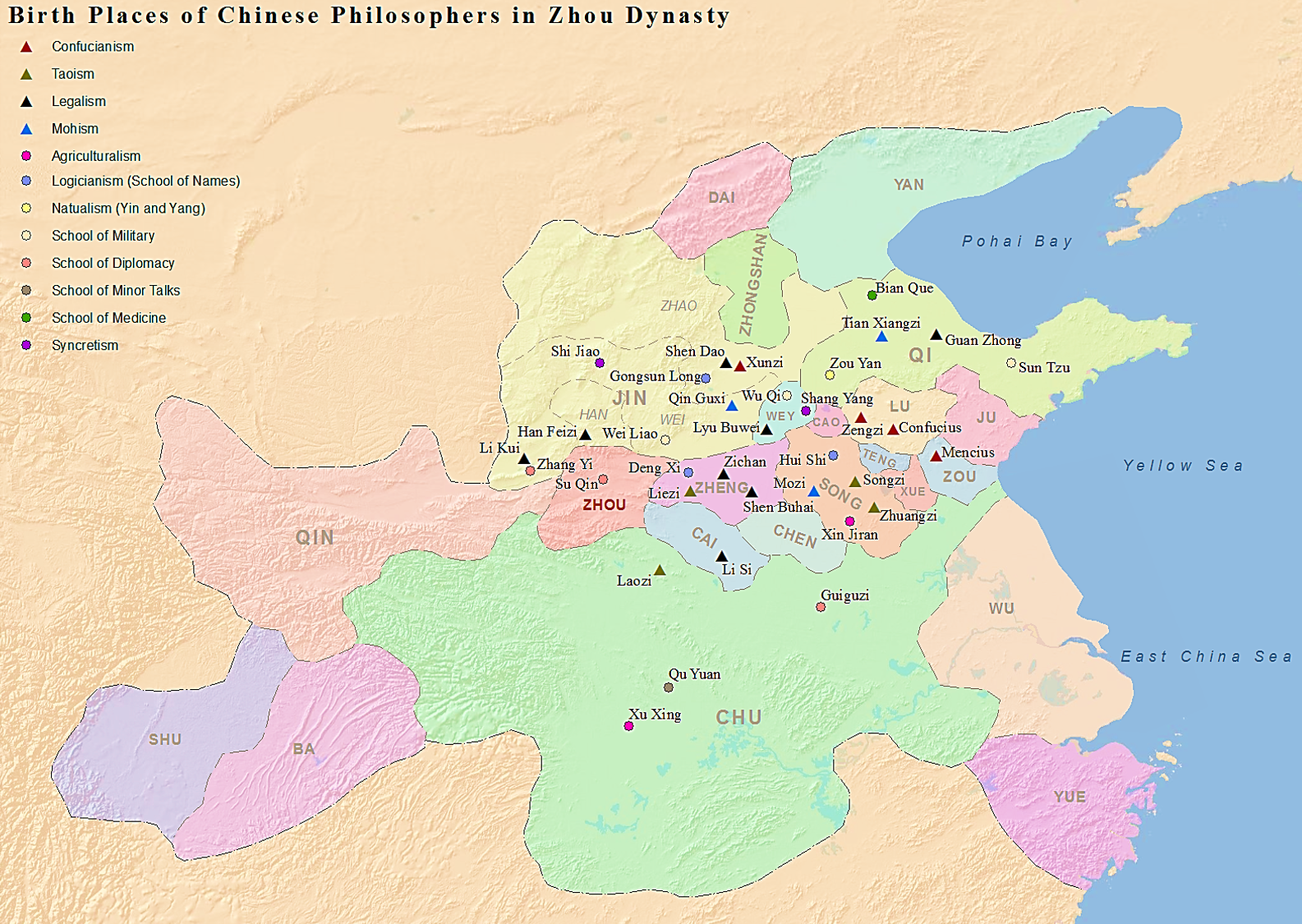
Birthplaces of notable Chinese philosophers of the Hundred Schools of Thought in Zhou dynasty. Confucians are marked by triangles in dark red.

According to He Guanghu, Confucianism may be identified as a continuation of the Shang-Zhou (c. 1600–256 BC) official religion, or the Chinese aboriginal religion which has lasted uninterrupted for three thousand years. Both the dynasties worshipped a supreme "godhead", called Shangdi ('Highest Deity') or Di by the Shang and Tian ('Heaven') by the Zhou. Shangdi was conceived as the first ancestor of the Shang royal house, an alternate name for him being the "Supreme Progenitor" (上甲; Shàngjiǎ). Shang theology viewed the multiplicity of gods of nature and ancestors as parts of Di. Di manifests as the Wufang Shangdi with the winds (風; fēng) as its cosmic will. With the Zhou dynasty, which overthrew the Shang, the name for the supreme godhead became tian. While the Shang identified Shangdi as their ancestor-god to assert their claim to power by divine right, the Zhou transformed this claim into a legitimacy based on moral power, the Mandate of Heaven. In Zhou theology, Tian had no singular earthly progeny, but bestowed divine favour on virtuous rulers. Zhou kings declared that their victory over the Shang was because they were virtuous and loved their people, while the Shang were tyrants and thus were deprived of power by Tian.

John C. Didier and David Pankenier relate the shapes of both the ancient Chinese characters for Di and Tian to the patterns of stars in the northern skies, either drawn, in Didier's theory by connecting the constellations bracketing the north celestial pole as a square, or in Pankenier's theory by connecting some of the stars which form the constellations of the Big Dipper and broader Ursa Major, and Ursa Minor (Little Dipper). Cultures in other parts of the world have also conceived these stars or constellations as symbols of the origin of things, the supreme godhead, divinity and royal power. The supreme godhead was also identified with the dragon, symbol of unlimited power (qi), of the protean primordial power which embodies both yin and yang in unity, associated to the constellation Draco which winds around the north ecliptic pole, and slithers between the Little and Big Dipper.

=== Zhou traditions wane ===
By the 6th century BC, the power of Tian and the symbols that represented it on earth (architecture of cities, temples, altars and ritual vessels, and the Zhou system of rites) became "diffuse" and claimed by different potentates in the Zhou states to legitimise economic, political, and military ambitions. Communication with the divine no longer was an exclusive privilege of the Zhou royal house, but might be bought by anyone able to afford the elaborate ceremonies and the old and new rites required to access the authority of Tian.

Besides the waning Zhou ritual system, what may be defined as 'wild' (野; yě) traditions, or traditions outside of the official system, developed as attempts to access the will of Tian. As central political authority crumbled in the wake of the collapse of the Western Zhou, the population lost faith in the official tradition, which was no longer perceived as an effective way to communicate with Heaven. The traditions of the 'Nine Fields' (九野) and of the Yijing flourished. Chinese thinkers, faced with this challenge to legitimacy, diverged in a "Hundred Schools of Thought", each positing its own philosophical lens for understanding the processes of the world.

Confucius (551–479 BC) appeared in this period of political reconfiguration and spiritual questioning. He was educated in Shang–Zhou traditions, which he contributed to transmit and reformulate giving centrality to self-cultivation and agency of humans, and the educational power of the self-established individual in assisting others to establish themselves (the 愛人; àirén; 'principle of loving others'). As the Zhou reign collapsed, traditional values were abandoned resulting in a period of perceived moral decline. Confucius saw an opportunity to reinforce values of compassion and tradition into society, with the intended goal of reconstructing what he believed to be a lost perfect moral order of high antiquity. Disillusioned with the culture, opposing scholars, and religious authorities of the time, he began to advance an ethical interpretation of traditional Zhou religion. In his view, the power of Tian is pervasive, and responds positively to the sincere heart driven by humaneness and rightness, decency and altruism. Confucius conceived these qualities as the foundation needed to restore socio-political harmony. Like many contemporaries, Confucius saw ritual practices as efficacious ways to access Tian, but he thought that the crucial knot was the reverent inner state that participants enter prior to engaging in the ritual acts. Confucius is said to have amended and recodified the classical books inherited from the Xia-Shang-Zhou dynasties, and to have composed the Spring and Autumn Annals.

=== Confucianism rises ===
Philosophers in the Warring States period, both focused on state-endorsed ritual and non-aligned to state ritual built upon Confucius's legacy, compiled in the Analects, and formulated the classical metaphysics that became the lash of Confucianism. In accordance with Confucius, they identified mental tranquility as the state of Tian, or 'the One' (一; Yī), which in each individual is the Heaven-bestowed divine power to rule one's own life and the world. They also extended the theory, proposing the oneness of production and reabsorption into the cosmic source, and the possibility to understand and therefore reattain it through correct state of mind. This line of thought would have influenced all Chinese individual and collective-political mystical theories and practices thereafter.

In the Han dynasty, Confucians beginning with Dong Zhongshu synthesised Warring States Confucianism with ideas of yin and yang, and wuxing, as well as folk superstition and the prior schools that led up to the School of Naturalists.

In the 460s, Confucianism competed with Chinese Buddhism and "traditional Confucianism" was "a broad cosmology that was as much about personal ethics as about spiritual beliefs" and had roots that went back to Confucianist philosophers from over a thousand years before.

=== Decline ===
The Confucian examination system was abolished in Korea in 1894, in China in 1905, and in Vietnam in 1919. This meant that conformity to Confucian ideology was no longer a prerequisite for a career in the civil service or politics, allowing persons of other ideologies (notably Nationalism and Socialism) to attain leading positions in society.

== Organisation and liturgy ==
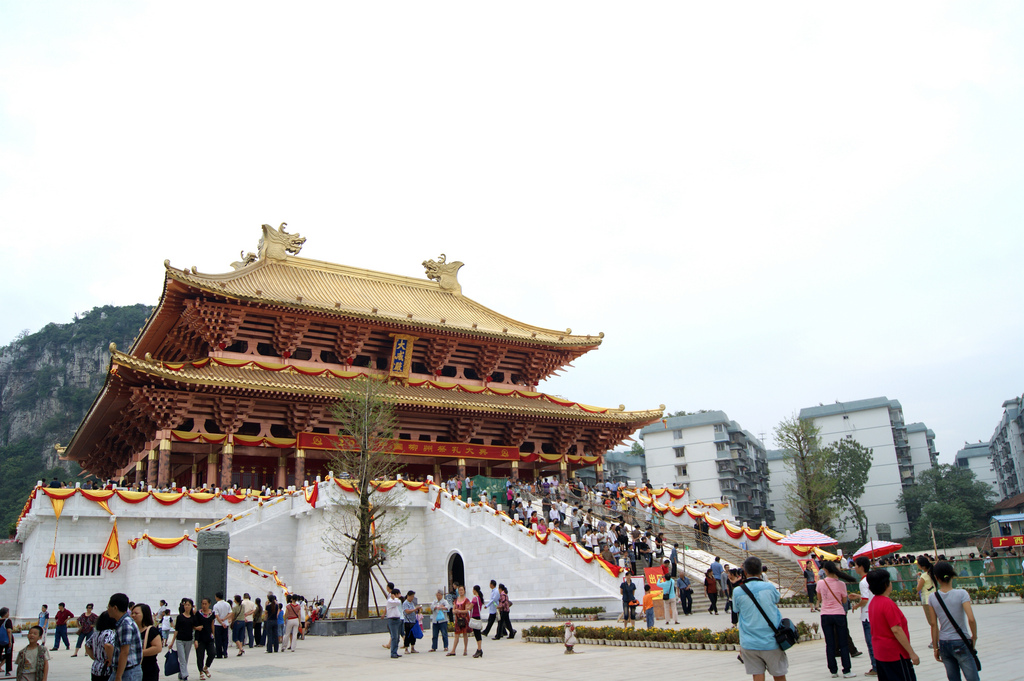
A Temple of the God of Culture (文庙; wénmiào) in Liuzhou, Guangxi, where Confucius is worshiped as 'God of Culture' (文帝; wéndì)

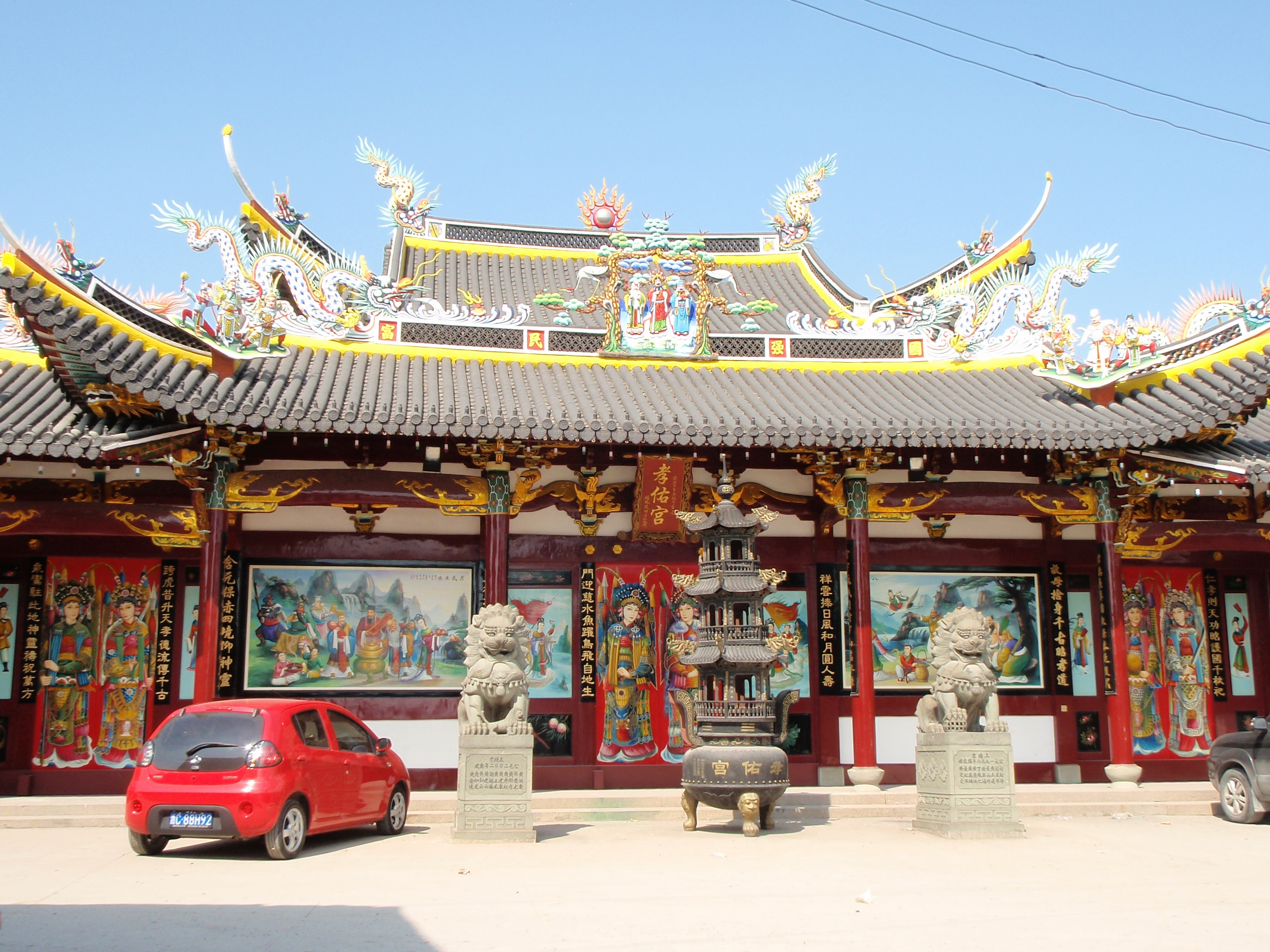
Temple of the Filial Blessing (孝佑宫; Xiàoyòugōng), an ancestral temple of a lineage church, in Wenzhou, Zhejiang

In the 1980s, Confucian thinking was re-introduced into the People's Republic of China via Hong Kong and Taiwan.

Since the 2000s, there has been a growing identification of the Chinese intellectual class with Confucianism. In 2003, the Confucian intellectual Kang Xiaoguang published a manifesto in which he made four suggestions: Confucian education should enter official education at any level, from elementary to high school; the state should establish Confucianism as the state religion by law; Confucian religion should enter the daily life of ordinary people through standardisation and development of doctrines, rituals, organisations, churches and activity sites; the Confucian religion should be spread through non-governmental organisations. Another modern proponent of the institutionalisation of Confucianism in a state church is Jiang Qing.

In 2005, the Center for the Study of Confucian Religion was established, and guoxue started to be implemented in public schools on all levels. Being well received by the population, even Confucian preachers have appeared on television since 2006. The most enthusiastic New Confucians proclaim the uniqueness and superiority of Confucian Chinese culture, and have generated some popular sentiment against Western cultural influences in China.

The idea of a "Confucian church" as the state religion of China has roots in the thought of Kang Youwei, an exponent of the early New Confucian search for a regeneration of the social relevance of Confucianism, at a time when it was de-institutionalised with the collapse of the Qing dynasty and the Chinese empire. Kang modeled his ideal "Confucian Church" after European national Christian churches, as a hierarchic and centralised institution, closely bound to the state, with local church branches, devoted to the worship and the spread of the teachings of Confucius.

In contemporary China, the Confucian revival has developed into various interwoven directions: the proliferation of Confucian schools or academies, the resurgence of Confucian rites, and the birth of new forms of Confucian activity on the popular level, such as the Confucian communities (社區儒學; shèqū rúxué). Some scholars also consider the reconstruction of lineage churches and their ancestral temples, as well as cults and temples of natural and national gods within broader Chinese traditional religion, as part of the renewal of Confucianism.

Other forms of revival are salvationist folk religious movements groups with a specifically Confucian focus, or Confucian churches, for example the Yīdān xuétáng (一耽學堂) of Beijing, the Mèngmǔtáng (孟母堂) of Shanghai, Confucian Shenism (also known as the "phoenix churches"), the Confucian Fellowship (儒教道壇; Rújiào Dàotán) in northern Fujian which has spread rapidly over the years after its foundation, and ancestral temples of the Kong kin (the lineage of the descendants of Confucius himself) operating as Confucian-teaching churches.

Also, the Hong Kong Confucian Academy, one of the direct heirs of Kang Youwei's Confucian Church, has expanded its activities to the mainland, with the construction of statues of Confucius, Confucian hospitals, restoration of temples and other activities. In 2009, Zhou Beichen founded another institution which inherits the idea of Kang Youwei's Confucian Church, the Holy Hall of Confucius (孔聖堂; Kǒngshèngtáng) in Shenzhen, affiliated with the Federation of Confucian Culture of Qufu City. It was the first of a nationwide movement of congregations and civil organisations that was unified in 2015 in the Holy Confucian Church. The first spiritual leader of the church is the scholar Jiang Qing, the founder and manager of the Yangming Confucian Abode (陽明精舍; Yángmíng jīngshě), a Confucian academy in Guiyang, Guizhou.

Chinese folk religious temples and kinship ancestral shrines may, on peculiar occasions, choose Confucian liturgy (called 儒; rú or 正統 (zhèngtǒng; 'orthopraxy') led by Confucian ritual masters (禮生; lǐshēng) to worship the gods, instead of Taoist or popular ritual. "Confucian businessmen" (儒商人; rúshāngrén, also "refined businessman") is a recently "rediscovered" concept defining people of the economic-entrepreneurial elite who recognise their social responsibility and therefore apply Confucian culture to their business.

Confucianists historically tried to proselytize to others, although this is rarely done in modern times. Given Confucianism's place of importance in historical Chinese governments, the argument has been made that Imperial China's wars were Confucianism's wars, but the connection between Confucianism and war is not so direct or simple. Modern Confucianism is the descendant of movements that greatly changed how they practiced the teachings of Confucius and his disciples from previous orthodox teachings.

== Governance ==
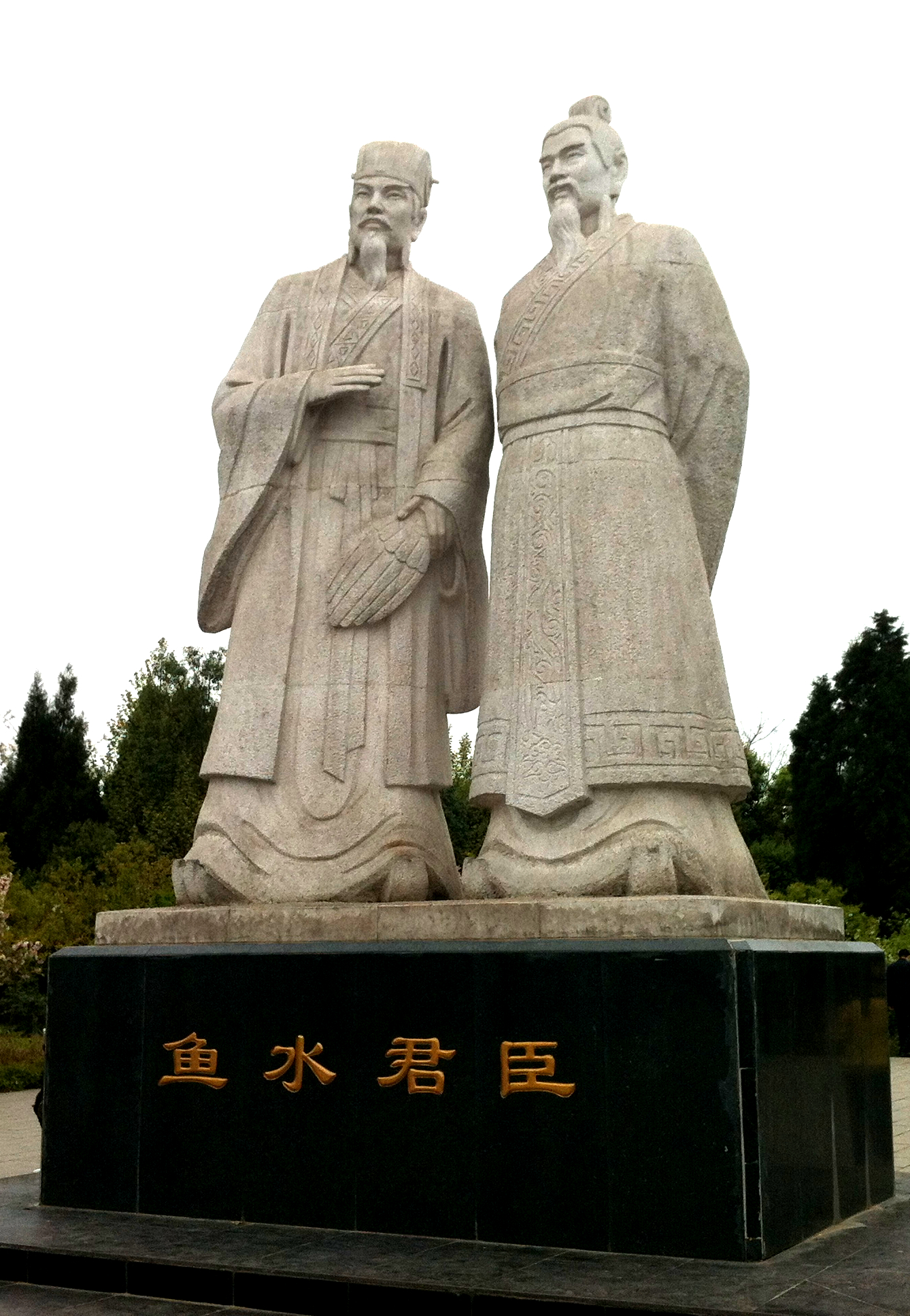
Statue of Liu Bei and Zhuge Liang, considered the ideal example of the loyalty, integrity and shared governance between a lord and minister in Chinese history (Note: The phrase "魚水君臣" ("Fish (and) water lord (and) subject") refers to the term "君臣魚水" from Records of the Three Kingdoms, where Liu Bei refers to gaining Zhuge Liang's service as if "a fish gaining water".)

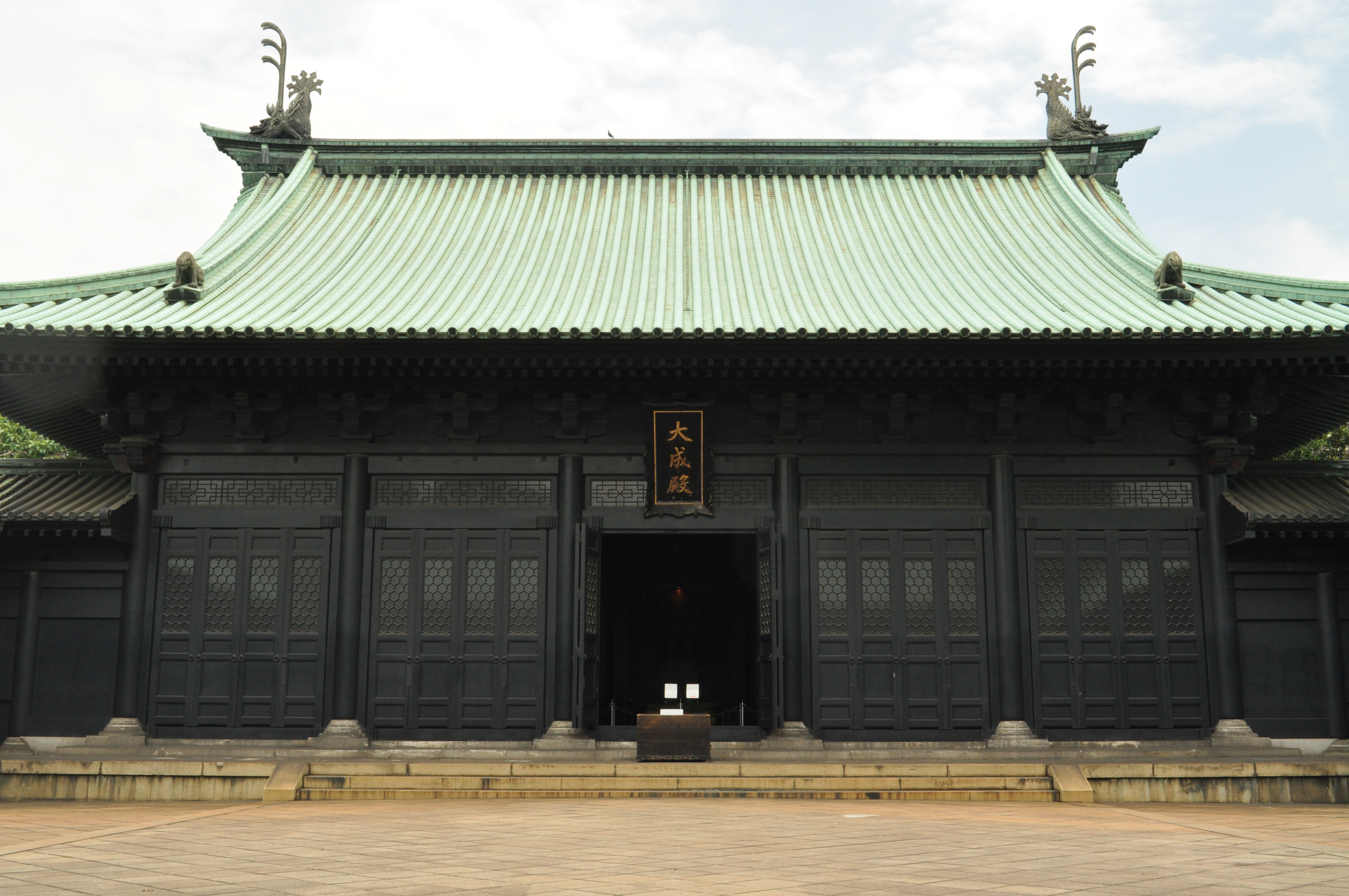
Yushima Seidō in Bunkyō, Tokyo, Japan

子曰：為政以德，譬如北辰，居其所而眾星共之。
The Master said, "He who exercises government by means of his virtue may be compared to the north polar star, which keeps its place and all the stars turn towards it."

— Analects 2.1 (Legge translation).

A key Confucian concept is that in order to govern others one must first cultivate inner virtue to be a moral elite. When actual, the king's personal virtue (de) spreads beneficent influence throughout the kingdom. The authority of the ruler and the submission of its people are grounded on a spiritual-ethical foundation, rather than on coercive power. Confucius' ideal of good government, is one led by a superior man (junzi), takes effective use of "culture and tradition", and relies less on law and punishment.

When Confucius praised the sage-king Shun for his "non-action", the undertone is different from the Taoist wu wei that emphasizes a spontaneous reaction to allow the natural course of things. The Confucian non-action is conditioned by a solid moral base and compassion for the welfare of the people. The virtuous ruler's non-action is further supported by the officials he appoints—individuals of upright character and benevolence toward the common people.

Mencius provided more concrete and specific measures in the making of a "good ruler". He advised that a good ruler must prioritize the people's welfare by ensuring adequate food and shelter, implementing light taxation, and avoiding unnecessary warfare, as moral instructions can only follow after people's basic needs are satisfied. He argued that rulers should govern by moral example—exhibiting sincerity, benevolence, and righteousness—so that subjects emulate virtuous conduct.

The emperors of China were considered agents of Heaven, endowed with the Mandate of Heaven, one of the most vital concepts in imperial-era political theory. According to the Confucian classics, the Mandate is not fated or absolute, it reacts to the wishes and interests of the people. While virtuous rulers keep the Mandate, wicked ruler would be abandoned by the Mandate.

Confucianism, despite supporting the importance of obeying national authority, places this obedience under absolute moral principles that curbed the willful exercise of power, rather than being unconditional. Submission to authority was only taken within the context of the moral obligations that rulers had toward their subjects, in particular ren. Confucians—including the most pro-authoritarian scholars such as Xunzi—have always recognised the right of revolution against tyranny.

== Meritocracy ==
子曰：有教無類。
The Master said: "In teaching, there should be no distinction of classes."

— Analects 15.39 (Legge translation).

Although Confucius claimed that he never invented anything but was only transmitting ancient knowledge (Analects 7.1), he did produce a number of new ideas. Many European and American admirers such as Voltaire and Herrlee G. Creel point to the revolutionary idea of replacing nobility of blood with nobility of virtue. Junzi ('lord's son'), which originally signified the younger, non-inheriting, offspring of a noble, became, in Confucius's work, an epithet having much the same meaning and evolution as the English "gentleman".

A virtuous commoner who cultivates his qualities may be a "gentleman", while a shameless son of the king is only a "petty person". That Confucius admitted students of different classes as disciples is a clear demonstration that he fought against the feudal structures that defined pre-imperial Chinese society.

Another new idea, that of meritocracy, led to the introduction of the imperial examination system in China. This system allowed anyone who passed an examination to become a government officer, a position which would bring wealth and honour to the whole family. The Chinese imperial examination system started in the Sui dynasty. Over the following centuries the system grew until finally almost anyone who wished to become an official had to prove his worth by passing a set of written government examinations.

Confucian political meritocracy is not merely a historical phenomenon. The practice of meritocracy still exists across China and East Asia today, and a wide range of contemporary intellectuals—from Daniel Bell to Tongdong Bai, Joseph Chan, and Jiang Qing—defend political meritocracy as a viable alternative to liberal democracy.

In Just Hierarchy, Daniel Bell and Wang Pei argue that hierarchies are inevitable. Faced with ever-increasing complexity at scale, modern societies must build hierarchies to coordinate collective action and tackle long-term problems such as climate change. In this context, people need not—and should not—want to flatten hierarchies as much as possible. They ought to ask what makes political hierarchies just and use these criteria to decide the institutions that deserve preservation, those that require reform, and those that need radical transformation. They call this approach "progressive conservatism", a term that reflects the ambiguous place of the Confucian tradition within the Left-Right dichotomy.

Bell and Wang propose two justifications for political hierarchies that do not depend on a "one person, one vote" system. First is raw efficiency, which may require centralized rule in the hands of the competent few. Second, and most important, is serving the interests of the people (and the common good more broadly). In Against Political Equality, Tongdong Bai complements this account by using a proto-Rawlsian "political difference principle". Just as Rawls claims that economic inequality is justified so long as it benefits those at the bottom of the socioeconomic ladder, so Bai argues that political inequality is justified so long as it benefits those materially worse off.

Bell, Wang, and Bai all criticize liberal democracy to argue that government by the people may not be government for the people in any meaningful sense of the term. They argue that voters tend to act in irrational, tribal, short-termist ways; they are vulnerable to populism and struggle to account for the interests of future generations. In other words, at a minimum, democracy needs Confucian meritocratic checks.

In The China Model, Bell argues that Confucian political meritocracy provides—and has provided—a blueprint for China's development. For Bell, the ideal according to which China should reform itself (and has reformed itself) follows a simple structure: Aspiring rulers first pass hyper-selective examinations, then have to rule well at the local level to be promoted to positions as the provincial level, then have to excel at the provincial level to access positions at the national level, and so on. This system aligns with what Harvard historian James Hankins calls "virtue politics", or the idea that institutions should be built to select the most competent and virtuous rulers—as opposed to institutions concerned first and foremost with limiting the power of rulers.

While contemporary defenders of Confucian political meritocracy all accept this broad frame, they disagree with each other on three main questions: institutional design, the means by which meritocrats are promoted, and the compatibility of Confucian political meritocracy with liberalism.

=== Institutional design ===
Bell and Wang favour a system in which officials at the local level are democratically elected and higher-level officials are promoted by peers. As Bell puts it, he defends "democracy at the bottom, experimentation in the middle, and meritocracy at the top." Bell and Wang argue that this combination conserves the main advantages of democracy—involving the people in public affairs at the local level, strengthening the legitimacy of the system, forcing some degree of direct accountability, etc.—while preserving the broader meritocratic character of the regime.

Jiang Qing, by contrast, imagines a tricameral government with one chamber selected by the people (the 庶民院; 'House of the Commoners'), one chamber composed of Confucian meritocrats selected via examination and gradual promotion (the 通儒院; 'House of Confucian Tradition'), and one body made up of descendants of Confucius himself (the 國體院; 'House of National Essence'). Jiang's aim is to construct a legitimacy that will go beyond what he sees as the atomistic, individualist, and utilitarian ethos of modern democracies and ground authority in something sacred and traditional. While Jiang's model is closer to an ideal theory than Bell's proposals, it represents a more traditionalist alternative.

Tongdong Bai presents an in-between solution by proposing a two-tiered bicameral system. At the local level, as with Bell, Bai advocates Deweyan participatory democracy. At the national level, Bai proposes two chambers: one of meritocrats (selected by examination, by examination and promotion, from leaders in certain professional fields, etc.), and one of representatives elected by the people. While the lower house does not have any legislative power per se, it acts as a popular accountability mechanism by championing the people and putting pressure on the upper house. More generally, Bai argues that his model marries the best of meritocracy and democracy. Following Dewey's account of democracy as a way of life, he points to the participatory features of his local model: citizens still get to have a democratic lifestyle, participate in political affairs, and be educated as "democratic men". Similarly, the lower house allows citizens to be represented, have a voice in public affairs (albeit a weak one), and ensure accountability. Meanwhile, the meritocratic house preserves competence, statesmanship, and Confucian virtues.

=== Promotion system ===
Defenders of Confucian political meritocracy generally champion a system in which rulers are selected on the basis of intellect, social skills, and virtue. Bell proposes a model wherein aspiring meritocrats take hyper-selective exams and prove themselves at the local levels of government before reaching the higher levels of government, where they hold more centralized power. In his account, the exams select for intellect and other virtues—for instance, the ability to argue three different viewpoints on a contentious issue may indicate a certain degree of openness. Tongdong Bai's approach incorporates different ways to select members of the meritocratic house, from exams to performance in various fields—business, science, administration, and so on. In every case, Confucian meritocrats draw on China's extensive history of meritocratic administration to outline the pros and cons of competing methods of selection.

For those who, like Bell, defend a model in which performance at the local levels of government determines future promotion, an important question is how the system judges who "performs best". In other words, while examinations may ensure that early-career officials are competent and educated, how is it thereafter ensured that only those who rule well get promoted? The literature opposes those who prefer evaluation by peers to evaluation by superiors, with some thinkers including quasi-democratic selection mechanisms along the way. Bell and Wang favour a system in which officials at the local level are democratically elected and higher-level officials are promoted by peers. Because they believe that promotion should depend upon peer evaluations only, Bell and Wang argue against transparency—i.e. the public should not know how officials are selected, since ordinary people are in no position to judge officials beyond the local level. Others, like Jiang Qing, defend a model in which superiors decide who gets promoted; this method is in line with more traditionalist strands of Confucian political thought, which place a greater emphasis on strict hierarchies and epistemic paternalism—that is, the idea that older and more experienced people know more.

=== Compatibility with liberalism and democracy, and critique of political meritocracy ===
Another key question is whether Confucian political thought is compatible with liberalism. Tongdong Bai, for instance, argues that while Confucian political thought departs from the "one person, one vote" model, it can conserve many of the essential characteristics of liberalism, such as freedom of speech and individual rights. In fact, both Daniel Bell and Tongdong Bai hold that Confucian political meritocracy can tackle challenges that liberalism wants to tackle, but cannot by itself. At the cultural level, for instance, Confucianism, its institutions, and its rituals offer bulwarks against atomization and individualism. At the political level, the non-democratic side of political meritocracy is—for Bell and Bai—more efficient at addressing long-term questions such as climate change, in part because the meritocrats do not have to worry about the whims of public opinion.

Joseph Chan defends the compatibility of Confucianism with both liberalism and democracy. In his book Confucian Perfectionism, he argues that Confucians can embrace both democracy and liberalism on instrumental grounds; that is, while liberal democracy may not be valuable for its own sake, its institutions remain valuable—particularly when combined with a broadly Confucian culture—to serve Confucian ends and inculcate Confucian virtues.

Other Confucians have criticized Confucian meritocrats like Bell for their rejection of democracy. For them, Confucianism does not have to be premised on the assumption that meritorious, virtuous political leadership is inherently incompatible with popular sovereignty, political equality and the right to political participation. These thinkers accuse the meritocrats of overestimating the flaws of democracy, mistaking temporary flaws for permanent and inherent features, and underestimating the challenges that the construction of a true political meritocracy poses in practice—including those faced by contemporary China and Singapore. Franz Mang claims that, when decoupled from democracy, meritocracy tends to deteriorate into an oppressive regime under putatively "meritorious" but actually "authoritarian" rulers; Mang accuses Bell's China model of being self-defeating, as—Mang claims—the CCP's authoritarian modes of engagement with the dissenting voices illustrate. He Baogang and Mark Warren add that "meritocracy" should be understood as a concept describing a regime's character rather than its type, which is determined by distribution of political power—on their view, democratic institutions can be built which are meritocratic insofar as they favour competence.

Roy Tseng, drawing on the New Confucians of the twentieth century, argues that Confucianism and liberal democracy can enter into a dialectical process, in which liberal rights and voting rights are rethought into resolutely modern, but nonetheless Confucian ways of life. This synthesis, blending Confucians rituals and institutions with a broader liberal democratic frame, is distinct from both Western-style liberalism—which, for Tseng, suffers from excessive individualism and a lack of moral vision—and from traditional Confucianism—which, for Tseng, has historically suffered from rigid hierarchies and sclerotic elites. Against defenders of political meritocracy, Tseng claims that the fusion of Confucian and democratic institutions can conserve the best of both worlds, producing a more communal democracy which draws on a rich ethical tradition, addresses abuses of power, and combines popular accountability with a clear attention to the cultivation of virtue in elites.

== Influence ==
=== In 17th-century Europe ===
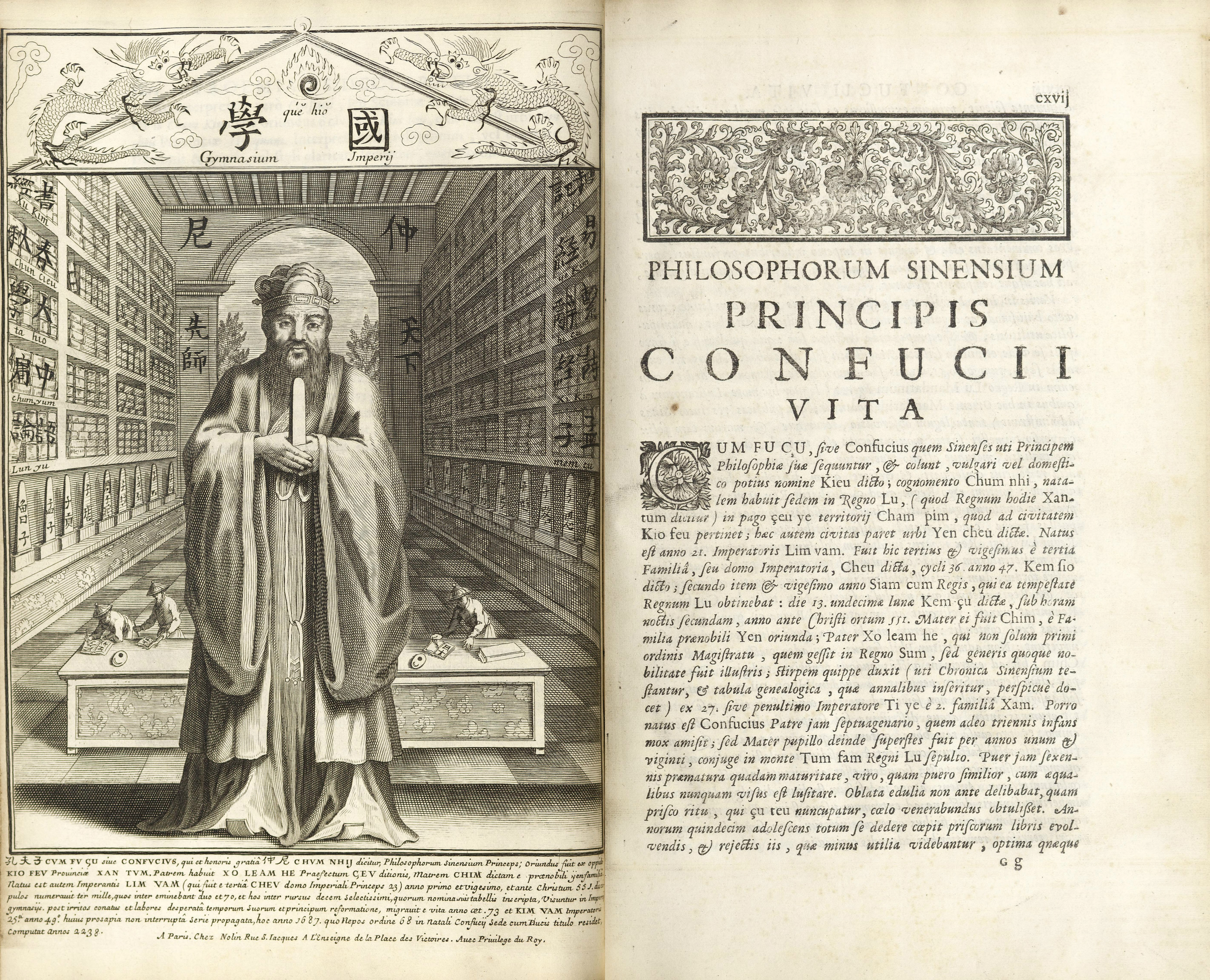
Life and Works of Confucius, by Prospero Intorcetta, 1687

The works of Confucius were translated into European languages through the agency of Jesuit missionaries stationed in China. (Note: The first was Michele Ruggieri who had returned from China to Italy in 1588, and carried on translating in Latin Chinese classics, while residing in Salerno.) Matteo Ricci was among the very earliest to report on the thoughts of Confucius, and father Prospero Intorcetta wrote about the life and works of Confucius in Latin in 1687.

Translations of Confucian texts influenced European thinkers of the period, particularly among the Deists and other philosophical groups of the Enlightenment who were interested by the integration of the system of morality of Confucius into Western civilization.

Confucianism influenced the German philosopher Gottfried Wilhelm Leibniz, who was attracted to the philosophy because of its perceived similarity to his own. It is postulated that certain elements of Leibniz's philosophy, such as "simple substance" and "Pre-established harmony", were borrowed from his interactions with Confucianism.

The French philosopher Voltaire, Leibniz's intellectual rival, was also influenced by Confucius, seeing the concept of Confucian rationalism as an alternative to Christian dogma. He praised Confucian ethics and politics, portraying the sociopolitical hierarchy of China as a model for Europe:

Confucius has no interest in falsehood; he did not pretend to be prophet; he claimed no inspiration; he taught no new religion; he used no delusions; flattered not the emperor under whom he lived ...

— Voltaire

=== On Islamic thought ===
From the late 17th century onwards a whole body of literature known as the Han Kitab developed amongst the Hui Muslims of China who infused Islamic thought with Confucianism. Especially the works of Liu Zhi such as Tianfang Dianli (天方典禮; Tiānfāng Diǎnlǐ) sought to harmonise Islam with not only Confucianism but also with Taoism and is considered to be one of the crowning achievements of the Chinese Islamic culture.

=== In modern times ===
Important military and political figures in modern Chinese history continued to be influenced by Confucianism, like the Muslim warlord Ma Fuxiang. The New Life Movement in the early 20th century was also influenced by Confucianism.

Referred to variously as the Confucian hypothesis and as a debated component of the more all-encompassing Asian Development Model, there exists among political scientists and economists a theory that Confucianism plays a large latent role in the ostensibly non-Confucian cultures of modern-day East Asia, in the form of the rigorous work ethic it endowed those cultures with. These scholars have held that, if not for Confucianism's influence on these cultures, many of the people of the East Asia region would not have been able to modernise and industrialise as quickly as Singapore, Malaysia, Hong Kong, Taiwan, Japan, South Korea and even China have done.

For example, the impact of the Vietnam War on Vietnam was devastating, but over the last few decades Vietnam has been re-developing in a very fast pace. Most scholars attribute the origins of this idea to futurologist Herman Kahn's World Economic Development: 1979 and Beyond.

Other studies, for example Cristobal Kay's Why East Asia Overtook Latin America: Agrarian Reform, Industrialization, and Development, have attributed the Asian growth to other factors, for example the character of agrarian reforms, "state-craft" (state capacity), and interaction between agriculture and industry.

Historical and current Confucianists were and are often environmentalists out of their respect for tian and the other aspects of nature and the "Principle" that comes from their unity and, more generally, harmony as a whole, which is "the basis for a sincere mind".

=== On Chinese martial arts ===
After Confucianism had become the official 'state religion' in China, its influence penetrated all walks of life and all streams of thought in Chinese society for the generations to come. This did not exclude martial arts culture. Though in his own day, Confucius had rejected the practice of Martial Arts (with the exception of Archery), he did serve under rulers who used military power extensively to achieve their goals. In later centuries, Confucianism heavily influenced many educated martial artists of great influence, such as Sun Lutang, especially from the 19th century onwards, when bare-handed martial arts in China became more widespread and had begun to more readily absorb philosophical influences from Confucianism, Buddhism and Daoism.

== Criticism ==
Confucius and Confucianism were opposed or criticised from the start, including Laozi's philosophy and Mozi's critique, and Legalists such as Han Fei ridiculed the idea that virtue would lead people to be orderly. In modern times, waves of opposition and vilification showed that Confucianism, instead of taking credit for the glories of Chinese civilisation, now had to take blame for its failures. The Taiping Rebellion described Confucian sages as well as gods in Taoism and Buddhism as devils.

=== Contradiction with modernist values ===
In the New Culture Movement, Lu Xun criticised Confucianism for shaping Chinese people into the condition they had reached by the late Qing dynasty: his criticisms are expressed metaphorically in the work "Diary of a Madman", in which traditional Chinese Confucian society is portrayed as feudalistic, hypocritical, socially cannibalistic, despotic, fostering a "slave mentality" favouring despotism, lack of critical thinking and blind obedience and worship of authority, fuelling a form of "Confucian authoritarianism" which persists into the present day. Leftists during the Cultural Revolution described Confucius as the representative of the slave-owning class.

In South Korea, there has long been criticism. Some South Koreans believe Confucianism has not contributed to the modernisation of South Korea. For example, South Korean writer Kim Kyong-il wrote a book in 1998 entitled "Confucius Must Die For the Nation to Live" (공자가 죽어야 나라가 산다, gongjaga jug-eoya naraga sanda). Kim said that filial piety is one-sided and blind, and if it continues, social problems will continue as government keeps forcing Confucian filial obligations onto families.

=== Women in Confucian thought ===
Confucianism "largely defined the mainstream discourse on gender in China from the Han dynasty onward." The gender roles prescribed in the Three Obediences and Four Virtues became a cornerstone of the family, and thus, societal stability. The Three Obediences and Four Virtues is one of the moral standards for feudal etiquette to bind women. Starting from the Han period, Confucians began to teach that a virtuous woman was supposed to follow the males in her family: the father before her marriage, the husband after she marries, and her sons in widowhood. In the later dynasties, more emphasis was placed on the virtue of chastity. The Song dynasty Confucian Cheng Yi stated that: "To starve to death is a small matter, but to lose one's chastity is a great matter." It was during the Song dynasty that the value of chastity was so severe, Confucian scholars criminalized the remarriage of widows. Widows were revered and memorialised during the Ming and Qing periods. The principle of chaste widowhood was made an official institution during the Ming dynasty. This "cult of chastity" accordingly condemned many widows to poverty and loneliness by placing a social stigma on remarriage. Though the repercussions for widows at times went beyond poverty and loneliness, as for some the preservation of chastity resulted in suicide. The ideal of a chaste widow became an extremely high honor and esteem, especially for a woman who chose to end her life after her husband's death. Many instances of such acts were recorded in, Biographies of Virtuous Women, "a collection of stories of women who distinguished themselves by committing suicide after their husband’s deaths to guard their chastity and purity". Though it can be contested whether all these instances can be deemed self-sacrificing for the virtue of chastity, as it became common practice for women to be forced to commit suicide after their husband's death. This resulted from the honor which chaste widowhood garnered, lending itself to the husband's family as well as his clan or village.

For years, many modern scholars have regarded Confucianism as a sexist, patriarchal ideology that was historically damaging to Chinese women. It has also been argued by some Chinese and Western writers that the rise of neo-Confucianism during the Song dynasty had led to a decline of status of women. Some critics have also accused the prominent Song neo-Confucian scholar Zhu Xi for believing in the inferiority of women and that men and women need to be kept strictly separate, while Sima Guang also believed that women should remain indoors and not deal with the matters of men in the outside world. Finally, scholars have discussed the attitudes toward women in Confucian texts such as Analects. In a much-discussed passage, women are grouped together with 'small people' (小人), meaning people of low status or low morals) and described as being difficult to cultivate or deal with. Many traditional commentators and modern scholars have debated over the precise meaning of the passage, and whether Confucius referred to all women or just certain groups of women.

Further analysis suggests, however, that women's place in Confucian society may be more complex. During the Han dynasty period, the influential Confucian text Lessons for Women was written by Ban Zhao (45–114 CE) to instruct her daughters how to be proper Confucian wives and mothers, that is, to be silent, hard-working, and compliant. She stresses the complementarity and equal importance of the male and female roles according to yin-yang theory, but she clearly accepts the dominance of the male. However, she does present education and literary power as important for women. In later dynasties, a number of women took advantage of the Confucian acknowledgment of education to become independent in thought.

Joseph A. Adler points out that "Neo-Confucian writings do not necessarily reflect either the prevailing social practices or the scholars' own attitudes and practices in regard to actual women." Matthew Sommers has also indicated that the Qing dynasty government began to realise the utopian nature of enforcing the "cult of chastity" and began to allow practices such as widow remarrying to stand. Moreover, some Confucian texts like Dong Zhongshu's Luxuriant Dew of the Spring and Autumn Annals have passages that suggest a more equal relationship between a husband and his wife. More recently, some scholars have also begun to discuss the viability of constructing a "Confucian feminism".

== Chinese Rites controversy ==
Ever since Europeans first encountered Confucianism, the issue of how Confucianism should be classified has been subject to debate. In the 16th and the 17th centuries, the earliest European arrivals in China, the Christian Jesuits, considered Confucianism to be an ethical system, not a religion, and one that was compatible with Christianity. The Jesuits, including Matteo Ricci, saw Chinese rituals as "civil rituals" that could co-exist alongside the spiritual rituals of Catholicism.

By the early 18th century, this initial portrayal was rejected by the Dominicans and Franciscans, creating a dispute among Catholics in East Asia that was known as the "Rites Controversy". The Dominicans and Franciscans argued that Chinese ancestral worship was a form of idolatry that was contradictory to the tenets of Christianity. This view was reinforced by Pope Benedict XIV, who ordered a ban on Chinese rituals, though this ban was re-assessed and repealed in 1939 by Pope Pius XII, provided that such traditions harmonize with the true and authentic spirit of the liturgy.

Some critics view Confucianism as definitely pantheistic and nontheistic, in that it is not based on the belief in the supernatural or in a personal god existing separate from the temporal plane. Confucius' views about tian and about the divine providence ruling the world, can be found above (in this page) and in Analects 6:26, 7:22, and 9:12, for example. On spirituality, Confucius said to Chi Lu, one of his students: "You are not yet able to serve men, how can you serve spirits?" Attributes such as ancestor worship, ritual, and sacrifice were advocated by Confucius as necessary for social harmony; these attributes may be traced to the traditional Chinese folk religion.

Scholars recognise that classification ultimately depends on how one defines religion. Using stricter definitions of religion, Confucianism has been described as a moral science or philosophy. But using a broader definition, such as Frederick Streng's characterisation of religion as "a means of ultimate transformation", Confucianism could be described as a "sociopolitical doctrine having religious qualities". With the latter definition, Confucianism is religious, even if non-theistic, in the sense that it "performs some of the basic psycho-social functions of full-fledged religions".

== See also ==
- Chinese culture
- Chinese folk religion
- Confucian art
- Confucian church
- Confucian view of marriage
- Confucianism in Indonesia
- Confucianism in the United States
- Confucius Institute
- Edo Neo-Confucianism
- Korean Confucianism
- Neo-Confucianism
- Religious Confucianism
- Sinology
- Taoism
- Temple of Confucius
- List of Confucian states and dynasties

== Bibliography ==
- Adler, Joseph A. (2020) [2006]. Confucianism as a Religious Tradition: Linguistic and Methodological Problems (PDF). Confucianism in Dialogue with Cultures and Religions: A Conference in Honor of Professor Tu Weiming. University of California at Berkeley. Archived (PDF) from the original on 23 January 2022.
- William Theodore De Bary (1989). Neo-Confucian Education: The Formative Stage. University of California Press. p. 455. ISBN 978-0-520-06393-8.
- Billioud, Sébastien; Thoraval, Joël (2015). The Sage and the People: The Confucian Revival in China. Oxford University Press. ISBN 978-0-19-025814-6.
- Billioud, Sébastien (2010). "Carrying the Confucian Torch to the Masses: The Challenge of Structuring the Confucian Revival in the People's Republic of China" (PDF). Oriens Extremus. 49. Harrassowitz Verlag. JSTOR i24047714. Archived (PDF) from the original on 10 October 2022.
- Clart, Philip (2003). "Confucius and the Mediums: Is There a "Popular Confucianism"?" (PDF). T'oung Pao. 89 (1/3). Brill: 1–38. doi:10.1163/156853203322691301. JSTOR 4528921. Archived (PDF) from the original on 10 October 2022.
- Chan, Joseph (2013). Confucian Perfectionism: A Political Philosophy for Modern Times. Princeton University Press. ISBN 978-0-691-16816-6.
- Chen Yong (2012). Confucianism as Religion: Controversies and Consequences. Brill. ISBN 978-90-04-24373-6.
- Creel, Herrlee Glessner (1949). Confucius and the Chinese Way. New York: Harper Torchbooks.
- John W. Dardess (1983). Confucianism and Autocracy: Professional Elites in the Founding of the Ming Dynasty. University of California Press. ISBN 978-0-520-04733-4.
- Didier, John C. (2009). "In and Outside the Square: The Sky and the Power of Belief in Ancient China and the World, c. 4500 BC – AD 200". Sino-Platonic Papers (192).
  - Volume I: The Ancient Eurasian World and the Celestial Pivot.
  - Volume II: Representations and Identities of High Powers in Neolithic and Bronze China.
  - Volume III: Terrestrial and Celestial Transformations in Zhou and Early-Imperial China.
- Elman, Benjamin A. (2005), On Their Own Terms: Science in China, 1550–1900, Harvard University Press, ISBN 978-0-674-01685-9.
- Fan Lizhu; Chen Na (2015). "The Religiousness of "Confucianism" and the Revival of Confucian Religion in China Today". Cultural Diversity in China. 1 (1): 27–43. doi:10.1515/cdc-2015-0005. ISSN 2353-7795.
- Fan Lizhu; Chen Na (18–23 March 2015a), "Revival of Confucianism and Reconstruction of Chinese Identity", The Presence and Future of Humanity in the Cosmos, Tokyo: ICU.
- Feuchtwang, Stephan (2016). "Chinese religions". In Woodhead, Linda; Kawanami, Hiroko; Partridge, Christopher H. (eds.). Religions in the Modern World: Traditions and Transformations (3nd ed.). London: Routledge. pp. 143–172. ISBN 978-1-317-43960-8.
- Fingarette, Herbert (1972). Confucius: The Secular as Sacred. New York: Harper. ISBN 978-1-4786-0866-0.
- Fung Yiu-ming (2008). "Problematizing Contemporary Confucianism in East Asia". In Richey, Jeffrey (ed.). Teaching Confucianism. Oxford University Press. pp. 157–186. ISBN 978-0-19-804256-3.
- Gardner, Daniel K. (2014). Confucianism: a very short introduction. Oxford: Oxford Univ. Press. ISBN 978-0-19-539891-5.
- Gunn, Geoffrey C. (2003), First Globalization: The Eurasian Exchange, 1500 to 1800, Rowman & Littlefield, ISBN 978-0-7425-2662-4.
- Haynes, Jeffrey (2008), Routledge Handbook of Religion and Politics, Taylor & Francis, ISBN 978-0-415-41455-5.
- Hsu, Daniel (16 November 2014). "The Civil Theology of Confucius' "Tian" Symbol". Voegelin View. Archived from the original on 24 December 2019.
- Ivanhoe, Philip J. (2000). Confucian Moral Self Cultivation (2nd rev. ed.). Indianapolis: Hackett Publishing. ISBN 978-0-87220-508-6.
- Libbrecht, Ulrich (2007). Within the Four Seas ...: Introduction to Comparative Philosophy. Peeters Publishers. ISBN 978-90-429-1812-2.
- Littlejohn, Ronnie (2010), Confucianism: An Introduction, I.B. Tauris, ISBN 978-1-84885-174-0.
- Nivison, David S. (1996). The Ways of Confucianism: Investigations in Chinese Philosophy. Chicago: Open Court Press. ISBN 978-0-8126-9340-9.
- Payette, Alex (19–24 July 2014). "Shenzhen's Kongshengtang: Religious Confucianism and Local Moral Governance". Panel RC43: Role of Religion in Political Life (PDF). 23rd World Congress of Political Science. Archived from the original (PDF) on 23 October 2017.
- Pankenier, David W. (2013). Astrology and Cosmology in Early China. Cambridge University Press. ISBN 978-1-107-00672-0.
- Rosenlee, Lisa Li-Hsiang (2012). Confucianism and Women: A Philosophical Interpretation. SUNY Press. p. 164. ISBN 978-0-7914-8179-0.
- Shen Qingsong; Shun Kwong-loi (2007), Confucian Ethics in Retrospect and Prospect, Council for Research in Values and Philosophy, ISBN 978-1-56518-245-5.
- Sinaiko, Herman L. (1998), Reclaiming the Canon: Essays on Philosophy, Poetry, and History, Yale University Press, ISBN 978-0-300-06529-9.
- Tay, Wei Leong (2010). "Kang Youwei: The Martin Luther of Confucianism and His Vision of Confucian Modernity and Nation" (PDF). Secularization, Religion and the State. Archived (PDF) from the original on 10 October 2022.
- Woo, Terry Tak-ling (2019). "Chinese & Korean Traditions". In Amore, Roy C.; Hussain, Amir; Oxtoby, Willard Gurdon (eds.). World religions: Eastern traditions (5th ed.). Oxford New York: Oxford University Press. ISBN 978-0-19-087549-7.
- Yang, C.K. (1961). Religion in Chinese Society; a Study of Contemporary Social Functions of Religion and Some of Their Historical Factors. Berkeley: University of California Press. ISBN 978-0-520-01371-1.
- Yao Xinzhong (2000). An Introduction to Confucianism. Cambridge University Press. ISBN 978-0-521-64312-2.
- Zhou Youguang (2012). "To Inherit the Ancient Teachings of Confucius and Mencius and Establish Modern Confucianism" (PDF). Sino-Platonic Papers (226). Archived (PDF) from the original on 10 October 2022.

Translations of the Analects

- Confucian Analects (1893) Translated by James Legge.
- The Analects of Confucius (1915; rpr. NY: Paragon, 1968). Translated by William Edward Soothill.
- The Analects of Confucius: A Philosophical Translation (New York: Ballantine, 1998). Translated by Roger T. Ames, Henry Rosemont.
- Confucius: The Analects (Lun yü) (London: Penguin, 1979; rpr. Hong Kong: Chinese University Press, 1992). Translated by D.C. Lau.
- The Analects of Confucius (Lun Yu) (Oxford: Oxford University Press, 1997). Translated by Chichung Huang.
- The Analects of Confucius (New York: W.W. Norton, 1997). Translated by Simon Leys.
- Analects: With Selections from Traditional Commentaries (Indianapolis: Hackett Publishing, 2003). Translated by Edward Slingerland.
