= Herbert Fingarette =

American philosopher (1921–2018)

- Born: Herbert Borenstein; January 20, 1921; Brooklyn, New York, U.S.
- Died: November 2, 2018 (aged 97); Berkeley, California, U.S.
- Spouse: Leslie Josephine Swabacker (m. 1945; died 2011)
- Children: 1

Academic background
- Education: University of California, Los Angeles (BA, PhD)
- Doctoral advisor: Donald Piatt

Academic work
- Discipline: Philosophy
- Sub-discipline: Confucianism; Ethics; Moral psychology
- Institutions: University of California, Santa Barbara
- Military career
- Branch: United States Army
- Conflicts: World War II

Herbert Fingarette (born Herbert Borenstein; January 20, 1921 – November 2, 2018) was an American philosopher and professor of philosophy at the University of California, Santa Barbara.

== Early life and education ==
Fingarette was born Herbert Borenstein in Brooklyn. His father, David Borenstein, manufactured sewing machine parts. As a teenager, he moved with his family to Los Angeles. He later adopted the last name of his stepfather, Harry Fingarette. Fingarette initially studied chemistry at the University of California, Los Angeles, but left to serve in the United States Army during World War II, where he was assigned to the Pentagon. He later earned a Bachelor of Arts degree and PhD in philosophy from UCLA under the direction of Donald Piatt.

== Career ==
Fingarette's work deals with issues in philosophy of mind, psychology, ethics, law, and Chinese philosophy.

In his 1969 monograph Self-Deception, Fingarette presents an account of the titular concept influenced by the work of Jean-Paul Sartre, Sören Kierkegaard and Sigmund Freud, as well as contemporary work in physiology and analytic philosophy. Fingarette argues that traditional accounts of self-deception fall invariably into paradox because these accounts see self-deception in terms of perception or knowledge. Such paradoxes may be resolved, Fingarette claims, by re-framing self-deception as a problem of volition and action. On these new terms, he defines self-deception as an agent's persistent refusal to "spell out" (explicitly acknowledge) and to avow some aspect of his engagement in the world.

Fingarette's 1972 monograph Confucius: The Secular As Sacred was described in a peer-reviewed academic journal as "one of the most significant philosophical books on the subject to be published in a long time".

Fingarette also influentially applied his work in moral psychology to pressing social and legal issues, particularly those surrounding addiction. In his 1988 book Heavy Drinking, Fingarette challenges the disease theory of alcoholism popularized by groups such as Alcoholics Anonymous. Fingarette's arguments were employed by the U.S. Supreme Court in a 1988 decision to deny VA educational benefits to two alcoholic American veterans.

Months before his death, Fingarette was the subject of a documentary short film Being 97, which deals with growing old, death, absence, and the meaning of life.

== Personal life ==
He was married to Leslie Josephine Swabacker from 1945 until her death in 2011. Fingarette died from heart failure in Berkeley, California, in 2018. He was survived by his daughter and two grandsons.

== Works ==
- Fingarette, Herbert (1965). The Self in Transformation: Psychoanalysis, Philosophy and the Life of the Spirit. Basic Books.
- Fingarette, Herbert (1967). On responsibility. Basic Books.
- Fingarette, Herbert (1969). Self-deception. Routledge & K. Paul. ISBN 0-7100-6346-6.
- Fingarette, Herbert (1972). Confucius: The Secular As Sacred. Harper and Row. ISBN 0-06-131682-2.
- Fingarette, Herbert (1972). The Meaning of Criminal Insanity. University of California Press. ISBN 0-520-02082-0.
- Fingarette, Herbert (1977). The Self in Transformation: Psychoanalysis, Philosophy and the Life of the Spirit. Harper Torchbooks. ISBN 0-06-131177-4.
- Fingarette, Herbert; Fingarette Hasse, Ann (1979). Mental Disabilities and Criminal Responsibility. University of California Press. ISBN 0-520-03630-1.
- Fingarette, Herbert (1988). Heavy Drinking: The Myth of Alcoholism as a Disease. University of California Press. ISBN 0-520-06290-6.
- Fingarette, Herbert (1999). Death: Philosophical Soundings. Open Court. ISBN 0-8126-9329-9.
- Fingarette, Herbert (2000). Self-Deception. University of California Press. ISBN 0-520-22052-8.
- Fingarette, Herbert (2004). Mapping Responsibility: Explorations in Mind, Law, Myth, and Culture. Open Court. ISBN 0-8126-9564-X.
