= Against Political Equality =

2019 non-fiction book by Tongdong Bai

Against Political Equality The Confucian Case
- Author: Tongdong Bai
- Subject: Political philosophy
- Publisher: Princeton University Press
- Publication date: 24 December 2019
- Media type: Print
- Pages: 344 pp (hardcover)
- ISBN: 9780691195995

Against Political Equality: The Confucian Case is a 2019 book by Tongdong Bai in which the author advocates a domestic governance that is influenced by Confucianism, possessing both meritocratic characteristics and democratic elements. Bai argues that egalitarianism and its analogous system of liberal democracy sometimes conflict with good governance and the protection of liberties, and that restriction of democracy is necessary for preservation of liberty.

== Reception ==
In Financial Times, Rana Mitter billed Against Political Equality as a "powerful and lively [contribution] to a major debate that has a long way to go."
