= Xinzhong Yao =

Professor Yao Xinzhong (Chinese: 姚新中; pinyin: Yáo Xīnzhōng; born 1957) is Dean of the School of Philosophy at Renmin University of China in Beijing, as well as author and editor of the Encyclopaedia of Confucianism. He was formerly director of the King's China Institute at King's College London. Prior to this appointment, Professor Yao was Professor of Religion and Ethics at the University of Wales, Lampeter, and a senior research fellow at the Ian Ramsey Centre, University of Oxford. He was educated at Renmin University, and took his Doctorate Degree at University of Wales.

Professor Yao has written books and articles on the subject of Confucianism, including comparative studies with Christianity. In 1998, in recognition of his work promoting Confucianism in the UK, he was made honorary President of the Confucian Academy in Hong Kong.

== Bibliography ==
- Yao, Xinzhong (2003). Encyclopaedia of Confucianism. RoutledgeCurzon. ISBN 978-1898723769.
- Yao, Xinzhong (2000). An Introduction To Confucianism. Cambridge University Press. ISBN 978-0521644303.
- Yao, Xinzhong (1997). Confucianism and Christianity: A Comparative Study of Jen and Agape. Sussex Academic Press. ISBN 978-1898723769.
