= Bai Tongdong =

Contemporary Confucian intellectual

Bai Tongdong (Chinese: 白彤东) is a Confucian intellectual and professor at Fudan University in Shanghai, China.

== Biography ==
Bai is a professor at Fudan University. Bai is also affiliated with New York University.

Bai was the first Chinese academic appointed to the Pontifical Academy of Social Sciences.

== Views and works ==
Bai is viewed as a leading contemporary Chinese scholar on Confucian political meritocracy. Bai is associated with "political Confucianism" rather than New Confucianism.

Bai contends Confucian political meritocracy is superior to Western democracy. According to Bai, China should embrace its meritocratic tradition, rather than Westernization, in order to have a successful political future.

Bai is the author of Against Political Equality. The text contends that an overemphasis on the principle of "one person, one vote" can lead to illiberal democratisation and that the more important priority is liberalism "in the form of rule of law and the protections of liberties and rights". Bai writes that the ideal legislature would be composed of a lower house elected by popular voter and an upper house whose members are elected by non-democratic means like examination or recommendation based on experience.

Bai's text China: The Political Philosophy of the Middle Kingdom contends that China in the Spring and Autumn Period and Warring States period had a social and political situation similar to that of modern Europe, and the Chinese philosophy of the period can be viewed as a kind of modern philosophy.
