= Sino-Platonic Papers =

- Discipline: Asian studies, Sinology
- Language: Multilingual
- Edited by: Victor H. Mair

Publication details
- History: 1986-present
- Publisher: Department of East Asian Languages and Civilizations, University of Pennsylvania (United States)
- Open access: Yes
- License: Creative Commons Attribution-NonCommercial-NoDerivs 2.5 License

Standard abbreviations
- ISO 4: Sino-Platonic Pap.

Indexing
- ISSN: 2157-9679 (print); 2157-9687 (web)
- LCCN: 2010203477
- OCLC no.: 213506013

Links
- Journal homepage

Sino-Platonic Papers is a scholarly monographic series published by the University of Pennsylvania. The chief focus of the series is on the intercultural relations of China and Central Asia with other peoples. The journal was established in 1986 by Victor H. Mair, to publish and encourage "unconventional or controversial" research by "younger, not yet well established, scholars and independent authors".

Issues 1 (November 1986) through 170 (February 2006) were published in traditional printed format, but beginning with issue 171 (June 2006), Sino-Platonic Papers has been published electronically only. All new issues, and old ones that are no longer in print, are provided free in PDF format, under the Creative Commons Attribution-NonCommercial-NoDerivs 2.5 License.

The Warring States Project, at the University of Massachusetts Amherst, called changing this journal's publication format to open access "an explicit challenge to the gatekeepers whose chief role is to keep the lid on."

After Mair's death on June 28, 2026, the journal announced that it would publish its remaining manuscripts which had gone through peer review and been approved by Mair but would not accept new submissions. The journal and all past issues are intended to remain online.
