= History of Buddhism =

The history of Buddhism can be traced back to the 5th century BCE. Buddhism originated in ancient India, in and around the Kingdom of Magadha, and is based on the teachings of the renunciate Siddhārtha Gautama. The religion evolved as it spread from the northeastern region of the Indian subcontinent throughout Central, East, and Southeast Asia. At one time or another, it influenced most of Asia.

The history of Buddhism is also characterized by the development of numerous movements, schisms, and philosophical schools. Among them were the Theravāda, Mahāyāna and Vajrayāna traditions, with contrasting periods of expansion and retreat.

== Shakyamuni Buddha (5th cent. BCE) ==
Buddhist expansion, from Buddhist heartland in northern India (dark orange) starting 5th century BCE, to Buddhist majority realm (orange), and historical extent of Buddhism influences (yellow). Mahayana (red arrow), Theravada (green arrow), and Tantric-Vajrayana (blue arrow).

The Mahājanapadas were the sixteen most powerful and vast kingdoms and republics around the lifetime of Gautama Buddha (563–483 BCE), located mainly across the fertile Indo-Gangetic plains, alongside a number of smaller kingdoms stretching the length and breadth of ancient India.

Siddhārtha Gautama (5th cent. BCE) was the historical founder of Buddhism. The early sources state he was born in the small Shakya (Pali: Sakya) Republic, which was part of the Kosala realm of ancient India, now in modern-day Nepal. He is thus also known as the Shakyamuni (literally: "The sage of the Shakya clan").

The Early Buddhist Texts contain no continuous life of the Buddha, only later after 200 BCE were various "biographies" with much mythological embellishment written. All texts agree however that Gautama renounced the householder life and lived as a śramaṇa ascetic for some time studying under various teachers, before attaining nirvana (extinguishment) and bodhi (awakening) through meditation.

For the remaining 45 years of his life, he travelled the Gangetic Plains of eastern-central India (the region of the Ganges River and its tributaries), teaching his doctrine to a diverse range of people from different castes and initiating monks into his order. The Buddha sent his disciples to spread the teaching across India. He also initiated an order of nuns. He urged his disciples to teach in the local language or dialects. He spent a lot of his time near the cities of Sāvatthī, Rājagaha and Vesālī (Skt. Śrāvastī, Rājagrha, Vāiśalī). By the time of his death at 80, he had thousands of followers.

== Early Buddhism ==
After the death of the Buddha, the Buddhist sangha (monastic community) remained centered on the Ganges valley, spreading gradually from its ancient heartland. The canonical sources record various councils, where the monastic sangha recited and organised the orally transmitted collections of the Buddha's teachings and settled certain disciplinary problems within the community. Modern scholarship has questioned the accuracy and historicity of these traditional accounts.

The first Buddhist council is traditionally said to have been held just after Buddha's Parinirvana, and presided over by Mahākāśyapa, one of his most senior disciples, at Rājagṛha (today's Rajgir) with the support of king Ajātasattu. According to Charles Prebish, almost all scholars have questioned the historicity of this first council.

== Mauryan Empire (322–185 BCE) ==
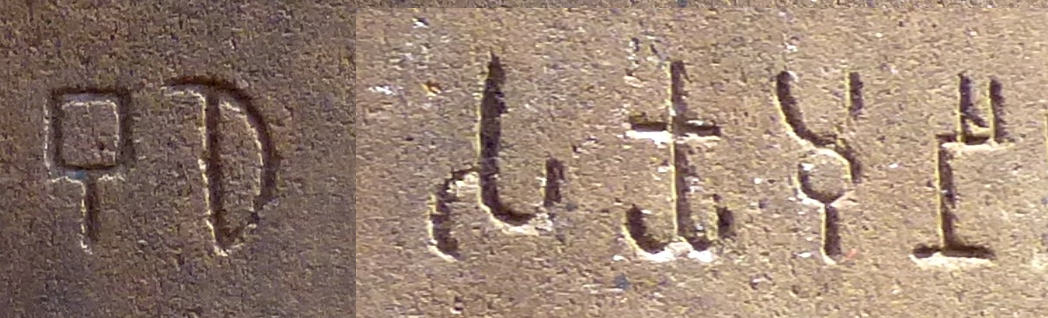
The words "Bu-dhe" (𑀩𑀼𑀥𑁂, the Buddha) and "Sa-kya-mu-nī" ( 𑀲𑀓𑁆𑀬𑀫𑀼𑀦𑀻, "Sage of the Shakyas") in Brahmi script, on Ashoka's Lumbini pillar inscription (circa 250 BCE)

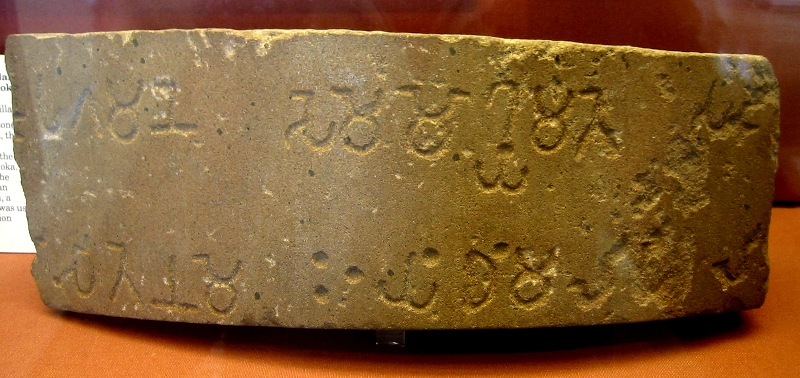
Fragment of the 6th Pillar Edict of Aśoka (238 BCE), in Brāhmī, sandstone. British Museum.

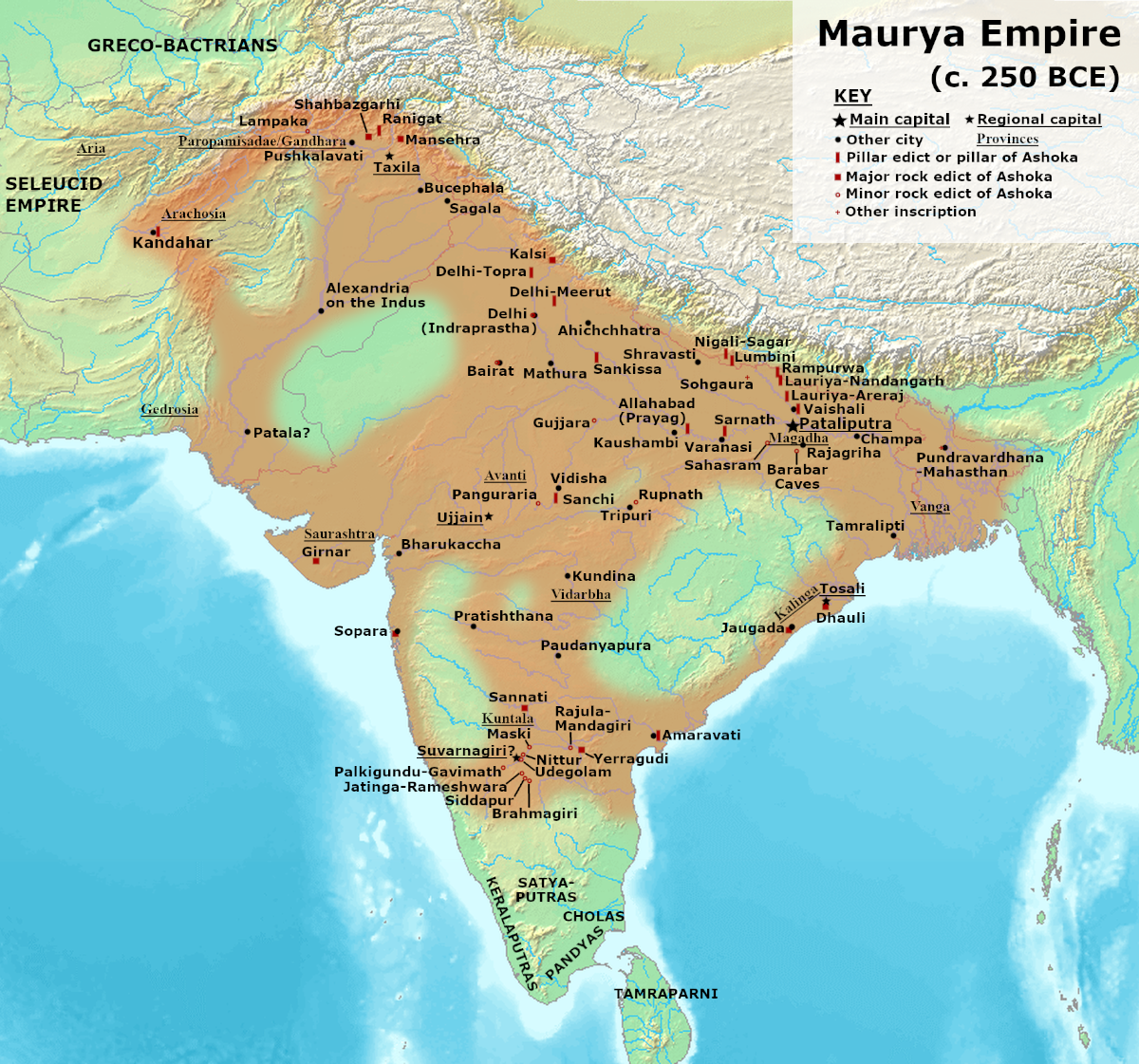
The Maurya Empire under Emperor Aśoka was the world's first major Buddhist state. It established free hospitals and free education and promoted human rights. Territories of the Maurya Empire conceptualized as core areas or linear networks separated by large autonomous regions in the works of scholars such as: historians Hermann Kulke and Dietmar Rothermund; Burton Stein; David Ludden; and Romila Thapar; anthropologists Monica L. Smith and Stanley Tambiah; archaeologist Robin Coningham; and historical demographer Tim Dyson.

=== Second Buddhist council and first schism ===
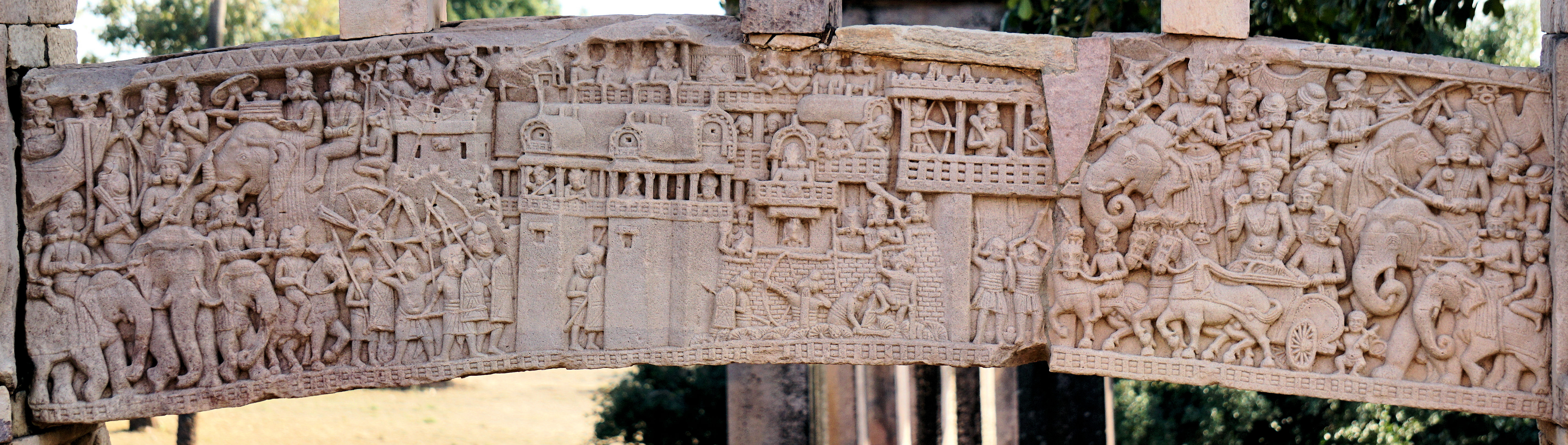
Mallakas defending the city of Kusinagara, as depicted at Sanchi. The leader of the Mallakas, under siege, by the seven gods, during the War of the Relics, which were objects associated with the Buddha. The Mallakas were an ancient Indian republic (gaṇasaṅgha) that constituted one of the solasa (sixteen) Mahajanapadas (great realms) of ancient India as mentioned in the Anguttara Nikaya.

After an initial period of unity, divisions in the sangha or monastic community led to the first schism of the sangha into two groups: the Sthavira (Elders) and Mahasamghika (Great Sangha). Most scholars agree that the schism was caused by disagreements over points of vinaya (monastic discipline). Over time, these two monastic fraternities would further divide into various Early Buddhist Schools.

Lamotte and Hirakawa both maintain that the first schism in the Buddhist sangha occurred during the reign of Ashoka. According to scholar Collett Cox "most scholars would agree that even though the roots of the earliest recognized groups predate Aśoka, their actual separation did not occur until after his death." According to the Theravada tradition, the split took place at the Second Buddhist council, which took place at Vaishali, approximately one hundred years after Gautama Buddha's parinirvāṇa. While the second council probably was a historical event, traditions regarding the Second Council are confusing and ambiguous. According to the Theravada tradition the overall result was the first schism in the sangha, between the Sthavira nikāya and the Mahāsāṃghikas, although it is not agreed upon by all what the cause of this split was.

The Sthaviras gave birth to a large number of influential schools including the Sarvāstivāda, the Pudgalavāda (also known as Vatsīputrīya), the Dharmaguptakas and the Vibhajyavāda (the Theravādins being descended from these). The Mahasamghikas meanwhile also developed their own schools and doctrines early on, which can be seen in texts like the Mahavastu, associated with the Lokottaravāda, or 'Transcendentalist' school, who might be the same as the Ekavyāvahārikas or "One-utterancers". This school has been seen as foreshadowing certain Mahayana ideas, especially due to their view that all of Gautama Buddha's acts were "transcendental" or "supramundane", even those performed before his Buddhahood.

In the third century BCE, some Buddhists began introducing new systematized teachings called Abhidharma, based on previous lists or tables (Matrka) of main doctrinal topics. Unlike the Nikayas, which were prose sutras or discourses, the Abhidharma literature consisted of systematic doctrinal exposition and often differed across the Buddhist schools who disagreed on points of doctrine. Abhidharma sought to analyze all experience into its ultimate constituents, phenomenal events or processes called dharmas. These texts further contributed to the development of sectarian identities. The various splits within the monastic organization went together with the introduction and emphasis on Abhidhammic literature by some schools. This literature was specific to each school, and arguments and disputes between the schools were often based on these Abhidhammic writings. However, actual splits were originally based on disagreements on vinaya (monastic discipline), though later on, by about 100 CE or earlier, they could be based on doctrinal disagreement. Pre-sectarian Buddhism, however, did not have Abhidhammic scriptures, except perhaps for a basic framework, and not all of the early schools developed an Abhidhamma literature.

=== Ashokan missions ===
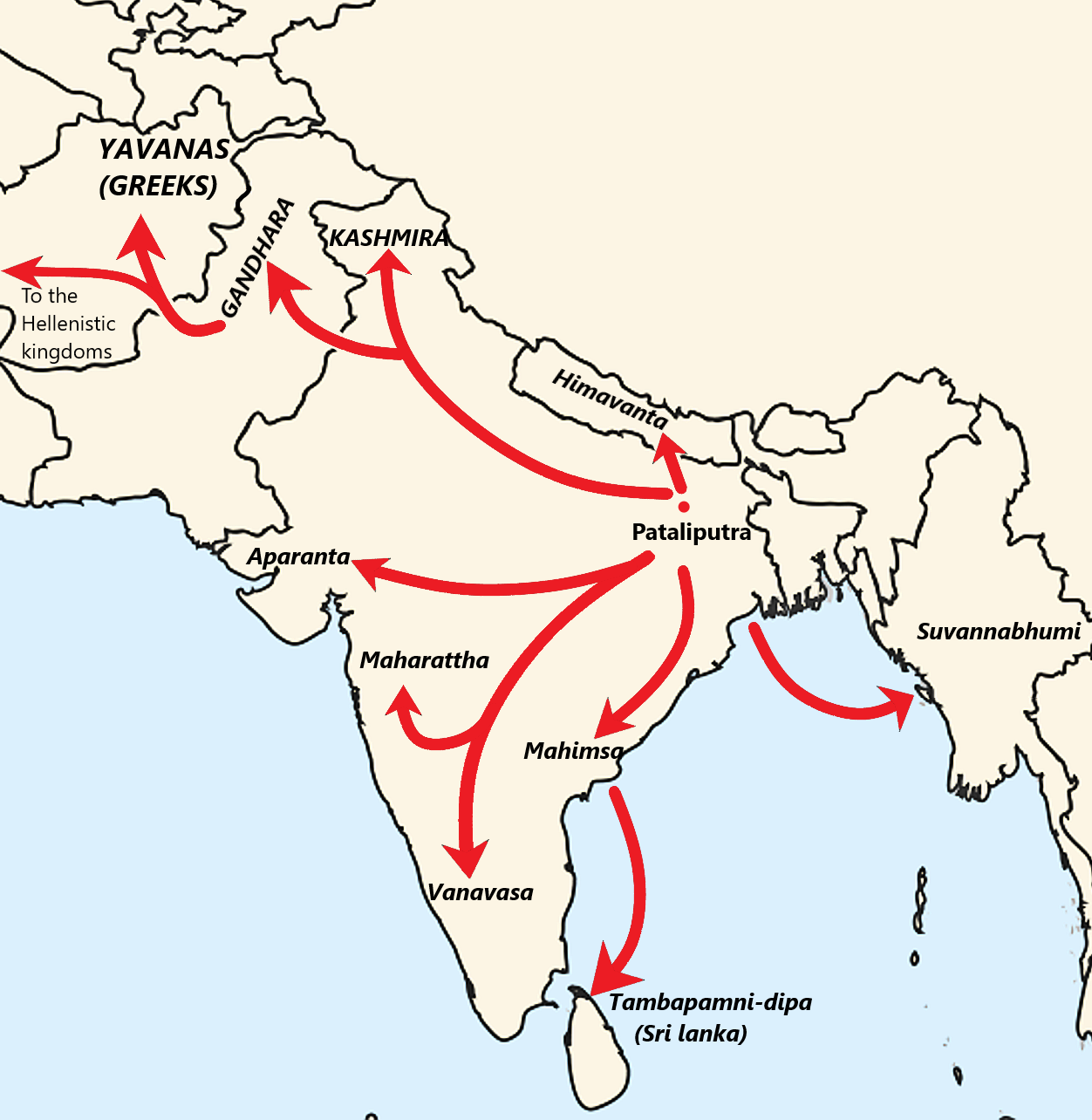
Map of the Buddhist missions during the reign of Ashoka

During the reign of the Mauryan Emperor Ashoka (268–232 BCE), Buddhism gained royal support and began to spread more widely, reaching most of the Indian subcontinent. After his invasion of Kalinga, Ashoka seems to have experienced remorse and began working to improve the lives of his subjects. Ashoka also built wells, rest-houses and hospitals for humans and animals. He also abolished torture, royal hunting trips and perhaps even the death penalty. Ashoka also supported non-Buddhist faiths like Jainism and Brahmanism. Ashoka propagated religion by building stupas and pillars urging, among other things, respect of all animal life and enjoining people to follow the Dharma. He has been hailed by Buddhist sources as the model for the compassionate chakravartin (wheel turning monarch).

Another feature of Mauryan Buddhism was the worship and veneration of stupas, large mounds which contained relics (Pali: sarīra) of the Buddha or other saints within. It was believed that the practice of devotion to these relics and stupas could bring blessings. Perhaps the best-preserved example of a Mauryan Buddhist site is the Great Stupa of Sanchi (dating from the 3rd century BCE).

According to the plates and pillars left by Aśoka (known as the Edicts of Ashoka), emissaries were sent to various countries in order to spread Buddhism, as far south as Sri Lanka and as far west as the Greek kingdoms, in particular the neighboring Greco-Bactrian Kingdom, and possibly even farther to the Mediterranean.

=== Third council ===
Theravadin sources state that Ashoka convened the third Buddhist council around 250 BCE at Pataliputra (today's Patna) with the elder Moggaliputtatissa. The objective of the council was to purify the Saṅgha, particularly from non-Buddhist ascetics who had been attracted by the royal patronage. Following the council, Buddhist missionaries were dispatched throughout the known world, as is recorded in some of the edicts of Ashoka.

=== Proselytism in the Hellenistic world ===
Some of the Edicts of Ashoka describe the efforts made by him to propagate the Buddhist faith throughout the Hellenistic world, which at that time formed an uninterrupted cultural continuum from the borders of India to Greece. The edicts indicate a clear understanding of the political organization in Hellenistic territories: the names and locations of the main Greek monarchs of the time are identified, and they are claimed as recipients of Buddhist proselytism: Antiochus II Theos of the Seleucid Empire (261–246 BCE), Ptolemy II Philadelphos of Egypt (285–247 BCE), Antigonus Gonatas of Macedonia (276–239 BCE), Magas (288–258 BCE) in Cyrenaica (modern Libya), and Alexander II (272–255 BCE) in Epirus (modern Northwestern Greece). One of the edicts states:

"The conquest by Dharma has been won here, on the borders, and even six hundred yojanas (5,400–9,600 km) away, where the Greek king Antiochos rules, beyond there where the four kings named Ptolemy, Antigonos, Magas and Alexander rule, likewise in the south among the Cholas, the Pandyas, and as far as Tamraparni (Sri Lanka)." (Edicts of Aśoka, 13th Rock Edict, S. Dhammika).

Furthermore, according to the Mahavamsa (XII), some of Ashoka's emissaries were Greek (Yona), particularly one named Dhammarakkhita. He also issued edicts in the Greek language as well as in Aramaic. One of them, found in Kandahar, advocates the adoption of "piety" (using the Greek term eusebeia for Dharma) to the Greek community.

It is not clear how much these interactions may have been influential, but authors like Robert Linssen have commented that Buddhism may have influenced Western thought and religion at that time. Linssen points to the presence of Buddhist communities in the Hellenistic world around that period, in particular in Alexandria (mentioned by Clement of Alexandria), and to the pre-Christian monastic order of the Therapeutae (possibly a deformation of the Pāli word "Theravāda"), who may have "almost entirely drawn (its) inspiration from the teaching and practices of Buddhist asceticism" and may even have been descendants of Aśoka's emissaries to the West. Philosophers like Hegesias of Cyrene and Pyrrho are sometimes thought to have been influenced by Buddhist teachings.

Buddhist gravestones from the Ptolemaic period have also been found in Alexandria, decorated with depictions of the Dharma wheel. The presence of Buddhists in Alexandria has even drawn the conclusion that they influenced monastic Christianity. In the 2nd century CE, the Christian dogmatist, Clement of Alexandria recognized Bactrian śramaṇas and Indian gymnosophists for their influence on Greek thought.

=== Establishment of Sri Lanka Buddhism ===
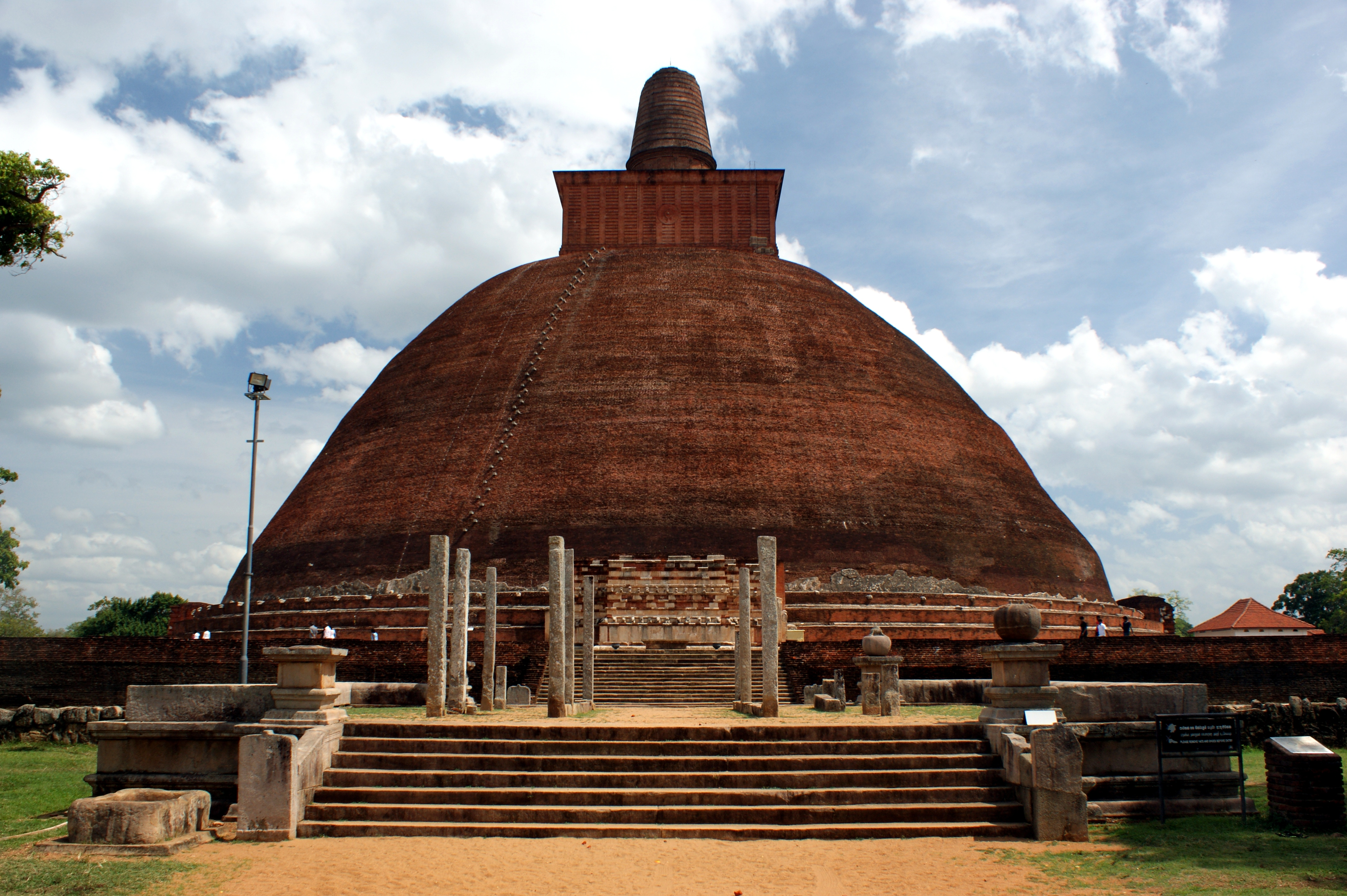
Jetavanaramaya in Anuradhapura, Sri Lanka, is the biggest brick structure in the world.

Sri Lankan chronicles like the Dipavamsa state that Ashoka's son Mahinda brought Buddhism to the island during the 2nd century BCE. In addition, Ashoka's daughter, Saṅghamitta also established the bhikkhunī (order for nuns) in Sri Lanka, also bringing with her a sapling of the sacred bodhi tree that was subsequently planted in Anuradhapura. These two figures are seen as the mythical founders of the Sri Lankan Theravada. They are said to have converted the King Devanampiya Tissa (307–267 BCE) and many of the nobility.

The first architectural records of Buddha images, however, actually come from the reign of King Vasabha (65–109 CE). The major Buddhist monasteries and schools in ancient Sri Lanka were Mahāvihāra, Abhayagiri and Jetavana. The Pāli canon was written down during the 1st century BCE to preserve the teaching in a time of war and famine. It is the only complete collection of Buddhist texts to survive in a Middle Indo-Aryan language. It reflects the tradition of the Mahavihara school. Later Pali Mahavihara commentators of the Theravada such as Buddhaghoṣa (4th–5th century) and Dhammapāla (5th–6th century), systematized the traditional Sri Lankan commentary literature (Atthakatha).

Although Mahāyāna Buddhism gained some influence in Sri Lanka as it was studied in Abhayagiri and Jetavana, the Mahavihara (“Great Monastery”) school became dominant in Sri Lanka following the reign of Parakramabahu I (1153–1186), who abolished the Abhayagiri and Jetavanin traditions.

== Mahāyāna Buddhism ==
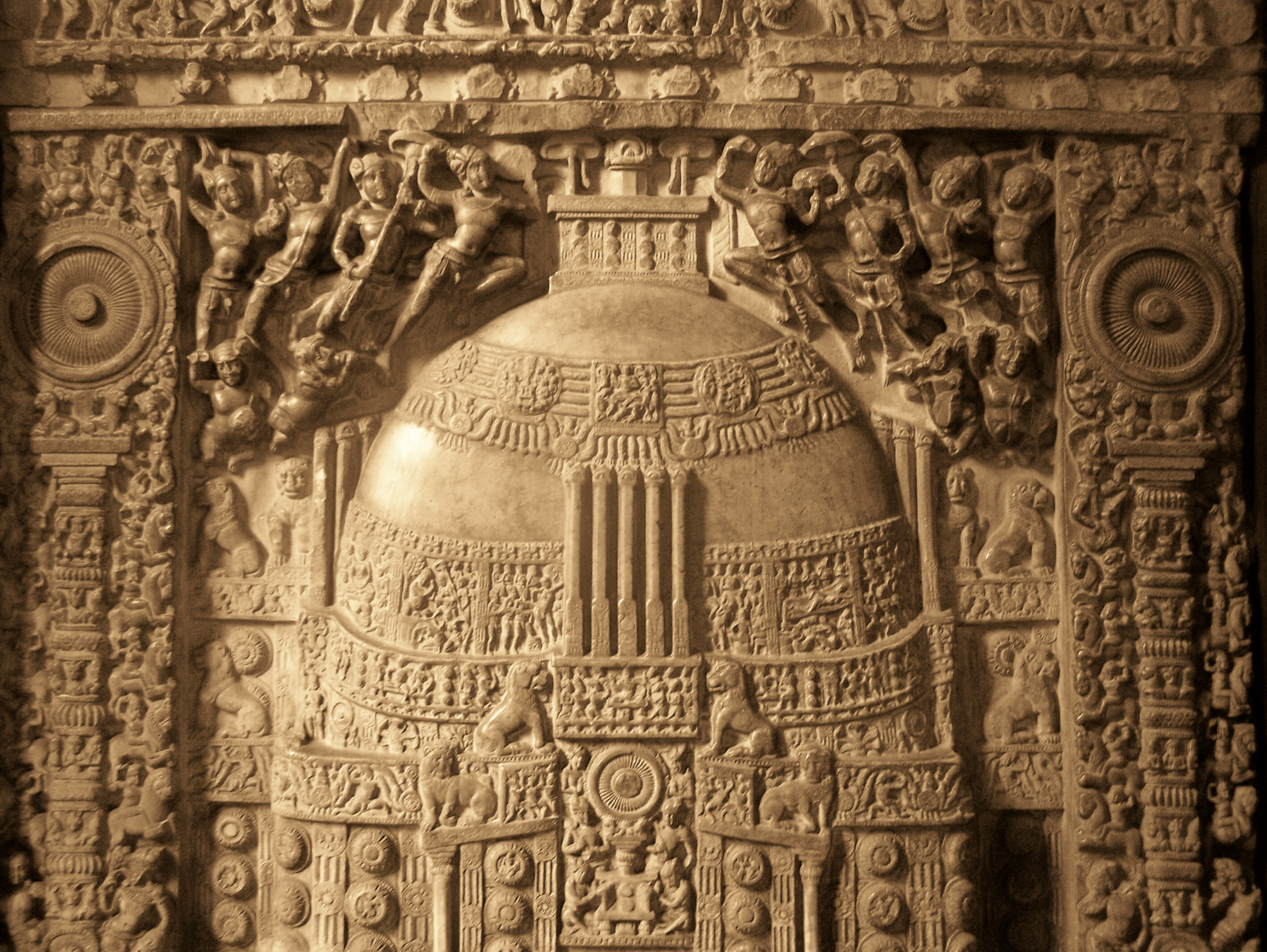
A relief depicting the Amarāvatī Stupa, a major site in Andhra Pradesh, India

The Buddhist movement that became known as Mahayana (Great Vehicle) and also the Bodhisattvayana, began sometime between 150 BCE and 100 CE, drawing on both Mahasamghika and Sarvastivada trends. The earliest inscription which is recognizably Mahayana dates from 180 CE and is found in Mathura.

The Mahayana emphasized the Bodhisattva path to full Buddhahood (in contrast to the spiritual goal of arhatship). It emerged as a set of loose groups associated with new texts named the Mahayana sutras. The Mahayana sutras promoted new doctrines, such as the idea that "there exist other Buddhas who are simultaneously preaching in countless other world-systems". In time Mahayana Bodhisattvas and also multiple Buddhas came to be seen as transcendental beneficent beings who were subjects of devotion.

Mahayana remained a minority among Indian Buddhists for some time, growing slowly until about half of all monks encountered by Xuanzang in 7th-century India were Mahayanists. Early Mahayana schools of thought included the Mādhyamaka, Yogācāra, and Buddha-nature (Tathāgatagarbha) teachings. Mahayana is today the dominant form of Buddhism in East Asia and Tibet.

Several scholars have suggested that the Prajñāpāramitā sūtras, which are among the earliest Mahāyāna sūtras, developed among the Mahāsāṃghika along the Kṛṣṇa River in the Āndhra region of South India. The earliest Mahāyāna sūtras to include the very first versions of the Prajñāpāramitā genre, along with texts concerning Akṣobhya Buddha, which were probably written down in the 1st century BCE in the south of India. A.K. Warder believes that "the Mahāyāna originated in the south of India and almost certainly in the Āndhra country." Anthony Barber and Sree Padma also trace Mahayana Buddhism to ancient Buddhist sites in the lower Kṛṣṇa Valley, including Amaravati Stupa, Nāgārjunakoṇḍā and Jaggayyapeṭa.

== Shunga Empire (2nd–1st century BCE) ==
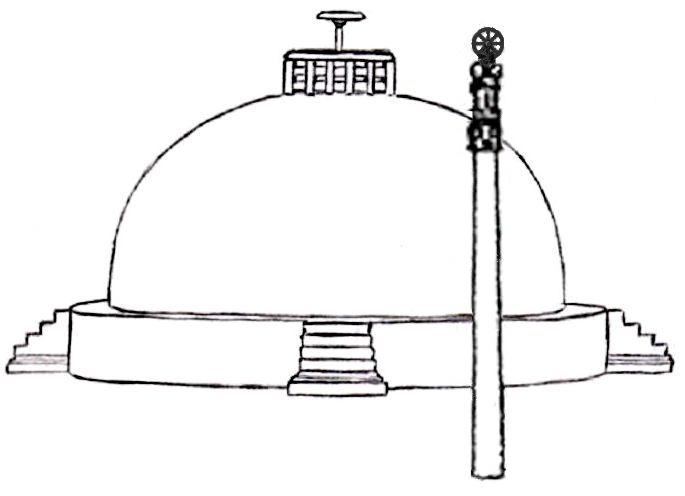
Approximate reconstitution of the Great Stupa with Ashoka Pillar, Sanchi, India

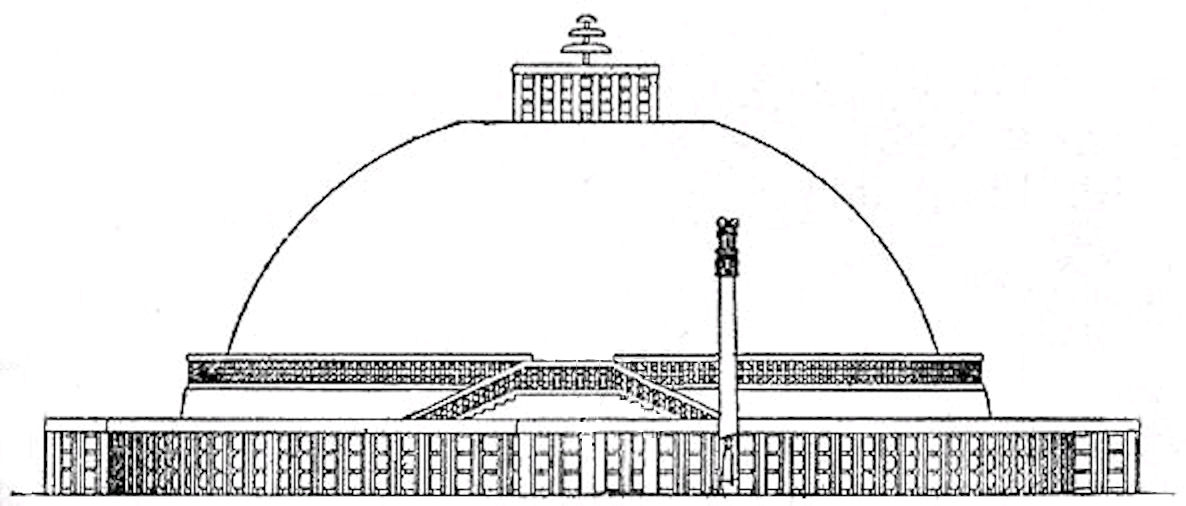
During 2nd century BCE the Sanchi stupa was nearly doubled in diameter, was encased in stone, and a balustrade and railing was built around it.

The Shunga Empire (185–73 BCE) was established about 50 years after Ashoka's death. After assassinating the last Maurya emperor, Brihadratha, military commander-in-chief Pushyamitra Shunga took the throne. Buddhist religious scriptures such as the Aśokāvadāna allege that Pushyamitra (an orthodox Brahmin) was hostile towards Buddhists and persecuted the Buddhist faith. Buddhists wrote that he "destroyed hundreds of monasteries and killed hundreds of thousands of innocent Monks": 840,000 Buddhist stupas which had been built by Ashoka were destroyed, and 100 gold coins were offered for the head of each Buddhist monk.

Modern historians, however, dispute this view in the light of literary and archaeological evidence. They opine that following Ashoka's sponsorship of Buddhism, it is possible that Buddhist institutions fell on harder times under the Shungas, but no evidence of active persecution has been noted. Etienne Lamotte observes: "To judge from the documents, Pushyamitra must be acquitted through lack of proof."

Another eminent historian, Romila Thapar points to archaeological evidence that "suggests the contrary" to the claim that "Pushyamitra was a fanatical anti-Buddhist" and that he "never actually destroyed 840,000 stupas as claimed by Buddhist works, if any". Thapar stresses that Buddhist accounts are probably hyperbolic renditions of Pushyamitra's attack of the Mauryas, and merely reflect the desperate frustration of the Buddhist religious figures in the face of the possibly irreversible decline in the importance of their religion under the Shungas.

During the period, Buddhist monks deserted the Ganges valley, following either the northern road (uttarapatha) or the southern road (dakṣinapatha). Conversely, Buddhist artistic creation stopped in the old Magadha area, to reposition itself either in the northwest area of Gandhāra and Mathura or in the southeast around Amaravati Stupa. Some artistic activity also occurred in central India, as in Bhārhut, to which the Shungas may or may not have contributed.

== Greco-Buddhism ==
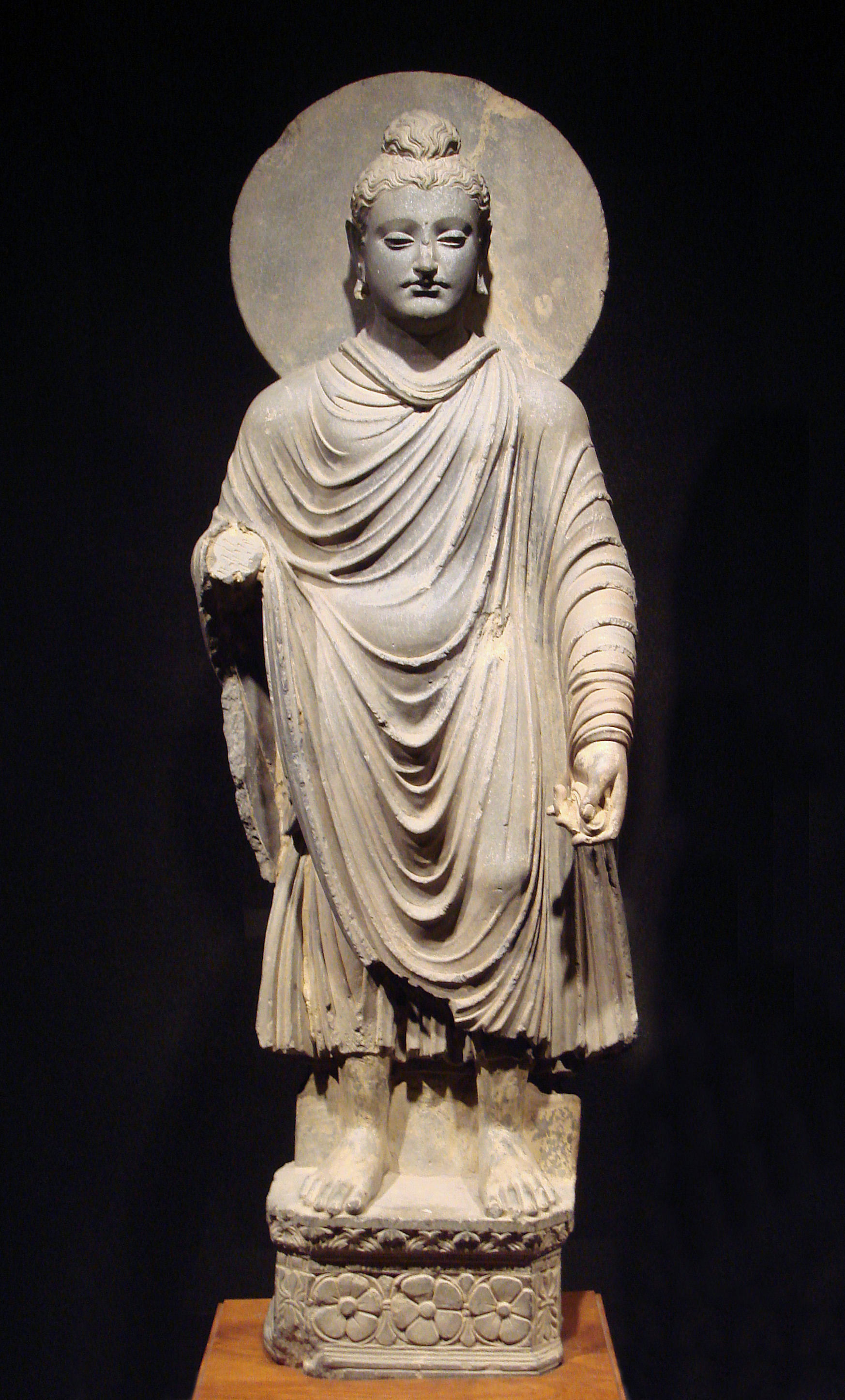
A Greco-Buddhist statue, one of the first representations of the Buddha, 1st–2nd century CE, Gandhara

The Greco-Bactrian king Demetrius I (reigned c. 200–180 BCE) invaded the Indian subcontinent, establishing the Indo-Greek Kingdom that was to last in parts of northwest South Asia until the end of the 1st century CE.

Buddhism flourished under the Indo-Greek and Greco-Bactrian kings. One of the most famous Indo-Greek kings is Menander (reigned c. 160–135 BCE). He may have converted to Buddhism and is presented in the Mahāyāna tradition as one of the great benefactors of the faith, on a par with king Aśoka or the later Kushan king Kaniśka. Menander's coins bear designs of the eight-spoked dharma wheel, a classic Buddhist symbol.

Direct cultural exchange is also suggested by a dialogue called the Debate of King Milinda (Milinda Pañha) which recounts a discussion between Menander and the Buddhist monk Nāgasena, who was himself a student of the Greek Buddhist monk Mahadharmaraksita. Upon Menander's death, the honor of sharing his remains was claimed by the cities under his rule, and they were enshrined in stupas, in a parallel with the historic Buddha. Several of Menander's Indo-Greek successors inscribed "Follower of the Dharma," in the Kharoṣṭhī script, on their coins.

During the first century BCE the first anthropomorphic representations of the Buddha are found in the lands ruled by the Indo-Greeks, in a realistic style known as Greco-Buddhist. Many of the stylistic elements in the representations of the Buddha point to Greek influence: the Greco-Roman toga-like wavy robe covering both shoulders (more exactly, its lighter version, the Greek himation), the contrapposto stance of the upright figures (see: 1st–2nd century Gandhara standing Buddhas), the stylicized Mediterranean curly hair and topknot (ushnisha) apparently derived from the style of the Belvedere Apollo (330 BCE), and the measured quality of the faces, all rendered with strong artistic realism (See: Greek art). A large quantity of sculptures combining Buddhist and purely Hellenistic styles and iconography were excavated at the Gandharan site of Hadda.

Several influential Greek Buddhist monks are recorded. Mahadharmaraksita (literally translated as 'Great Teacher/Preserver of the Dharma'), was "a Greek ("Yona") Buddhist head monk", according to the Mahavamsa (Chap. XXIX), who led 30,000 Buddhist monks from "the Greek city of Alasandra" (Alexandria of the Caucasus, around 150 km north of today's Kabul in Afghanistan), to Sri Lanka for the dedication of the Great Stupa in Anuradhapura during the rule (165–135 BCE) of King Menander I. Dhammarakkhita (meaning: Protected by the Dharma), was one of the missionaries sent by the Mauryan emperor Ashoka to proselytize the Buddhist faith. He is described as being a Greek (Pali: "Yona", lit. "Ionian") in the Sri Lankan Mahavamsa.

== Kushan Empire and Gandharan Buddhism ==
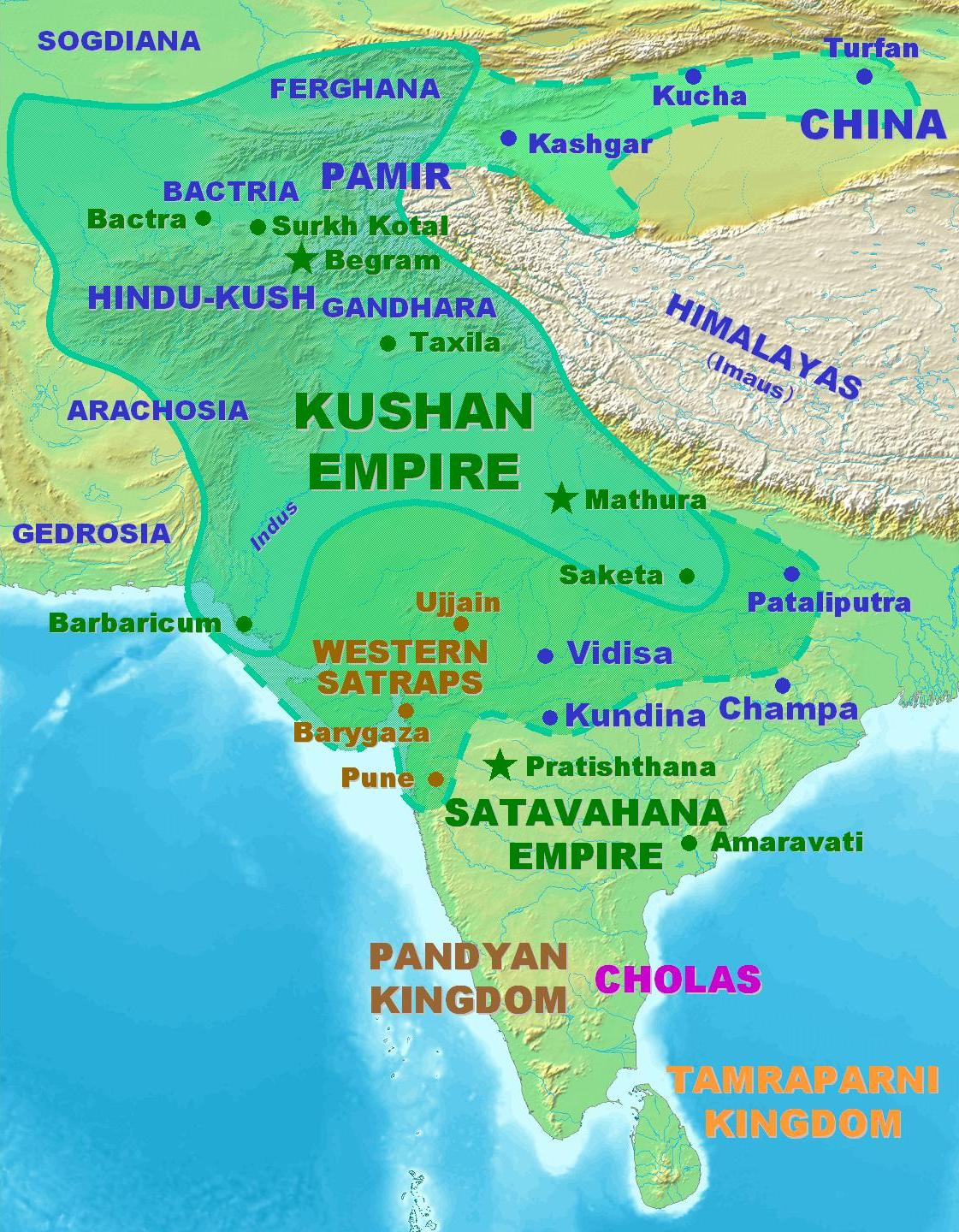
Kushan territories (full line) and maximum extent of Kushan dominions under Kanishka the Great (dotted line), which saw the height of Gandhāran Buddhist expansion

The Kushan Empire (30–375 CE) was formed by the invading Yuezhi nomads in the 1st century BCE. It eventually encompassed much of northern India, Pakistan, Afghanistan, Nepal, Tajikstan, and Uzbekistan. The Kushans adopted elements of the Hellenistic culture of Bactria and the Indo-Greeks. During Kushan rule, Gandharan Buddhism was at the height of its influence and a significant number of Buddhist centers were built or renovated.

The Buddhist art of Kushan Gandhara was a synthesis of Greco-Roman, Iranian and Indian elements. The Gandhāran Buddhist texts also date from this period. Written in Gāndhārī Prakrit, they are the oldest Buddhist manuscripts yet discovered (c. 1st century CE). According to Richard Salomon, most of them belong to the Dharmaguptaka school.

Emperor Kanishka (128–151 CE) is particularly known for his support of Buddhism. During his reign, stupas and monasteries were built in the Gandhāran city of Peshawar (Skt. Purusapura), which he used as a capital. Kushan royal support and the opening of trade routes allowed Gandharan Buddhism to spread along the Silk Road to Central Asia, the Tarim Basin and thus to China.

Kanishka is also said to have convened a major Buddhist council for the Sarvastivada tradition, either in Gandhara or Kashmir. Kanishka gathered 500 learned monks partly to compile extensive commentaries on the Abhidharma, although it is possible that some editorial work was carried out upon the existing Sarvastivada canon itself. Allegedly during the council there were altogether three hundred thousand verses and over nine million statements compiled, and it took twelve years to complete. The main fruit of this council was the compilation of the vast commentary known as the Mahā-Vibhāshā ("Great Exegesis"), an extensive compendium and reference work on a portion of the Sarvāstivādin Abhidharma. Modern scholars such as Etienne Lamotte and David Snellgrove have questioned the veracity of this traditional account.

Scholars believe that it was also around this time that a significant change was made in the language of the Sarvāstivādin canon, by converting an earlier Prakrit version into Sanskrit. Although this change was probably effected without significant loss of integrity to the canon, this event was of particular significance since Sanskrit was the sacred language of Brahmanism in India, and was also being used by other thinkers, regardless of their specific religious or philosophical allegiance, thus enabling a far wider audience to gain access to Buddhist ideas and practices.

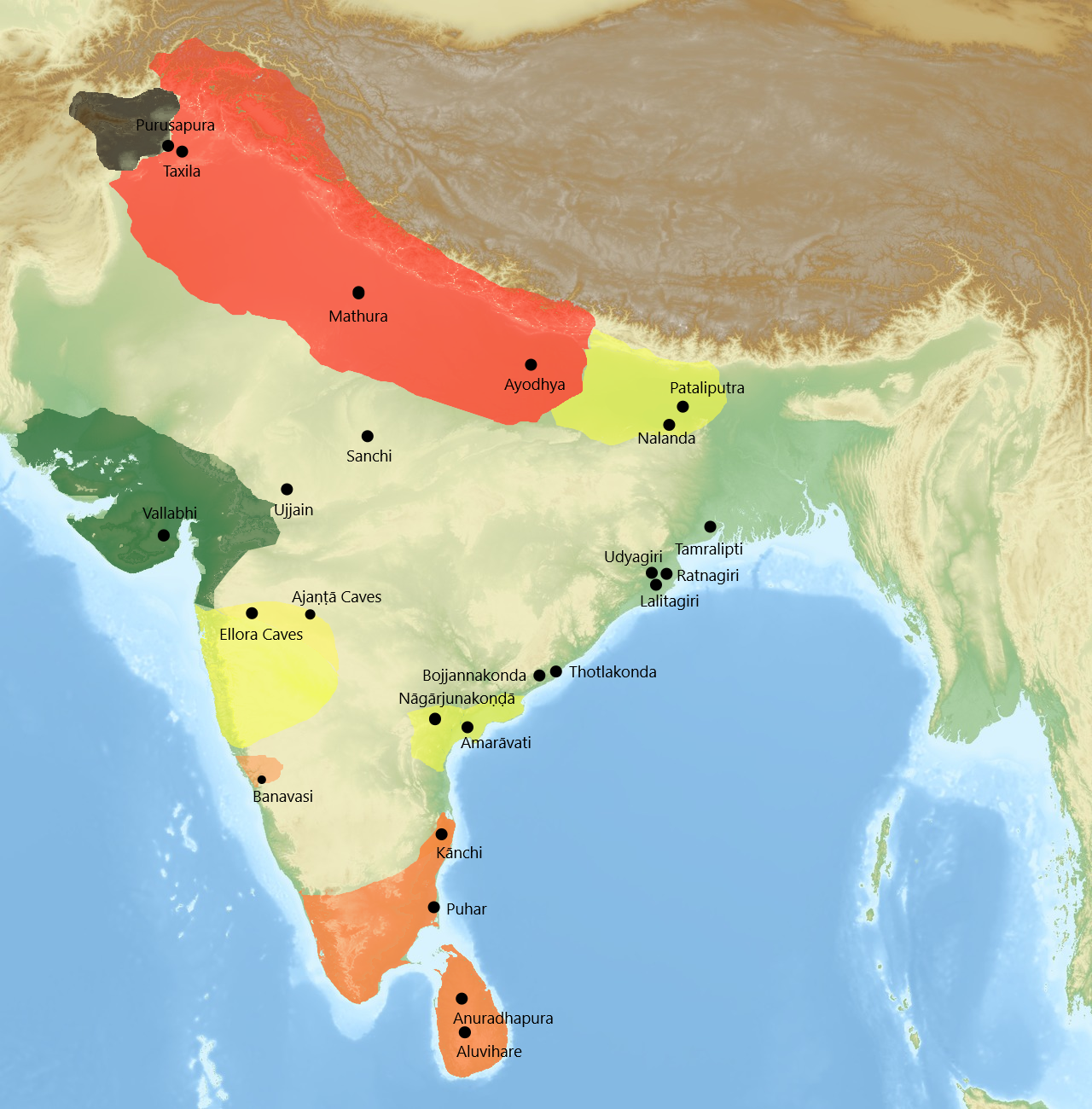
Map of the major geographical centers of major Buddhist schools in South Asia, at around the time of Xuanzang's visit in the seventh century. * Red: non-Pudgalavāda Sarvāstivāda school * Orange: non-Dharmaguptaka Vibhajyavāda schools * Yellow: Mahāsāṃghika * Green: Pudgalavāda (Green) * Gray: Dharmaguptaka

After the fall of the Kushans, small kingdoms ruled the Gandharan region, and later the Hephthalite White Huns conquered the area (circa 440s–670). Under the Hephthalites, Gandharan Buddhism continued to thrive in cities like Balkh (Bactria), as remarked by Xuanzang who visited the region in the 7th century. Xuanzang notes that there were over a hundred Buddhist monasteries in the city, including the Nava Vihara as well many stupas and monks. After the end of the Hephthalite empire, Gandharan Buddhism declined in Gandhara proper (in the Peshawar basin). However it continued to thrive in adjacent areas like the Swat Valley of Pakistan, Gilgit, Kashmir and in Afghanistan (in sites such as Bamiyan).

== Spread to Central Asia ==
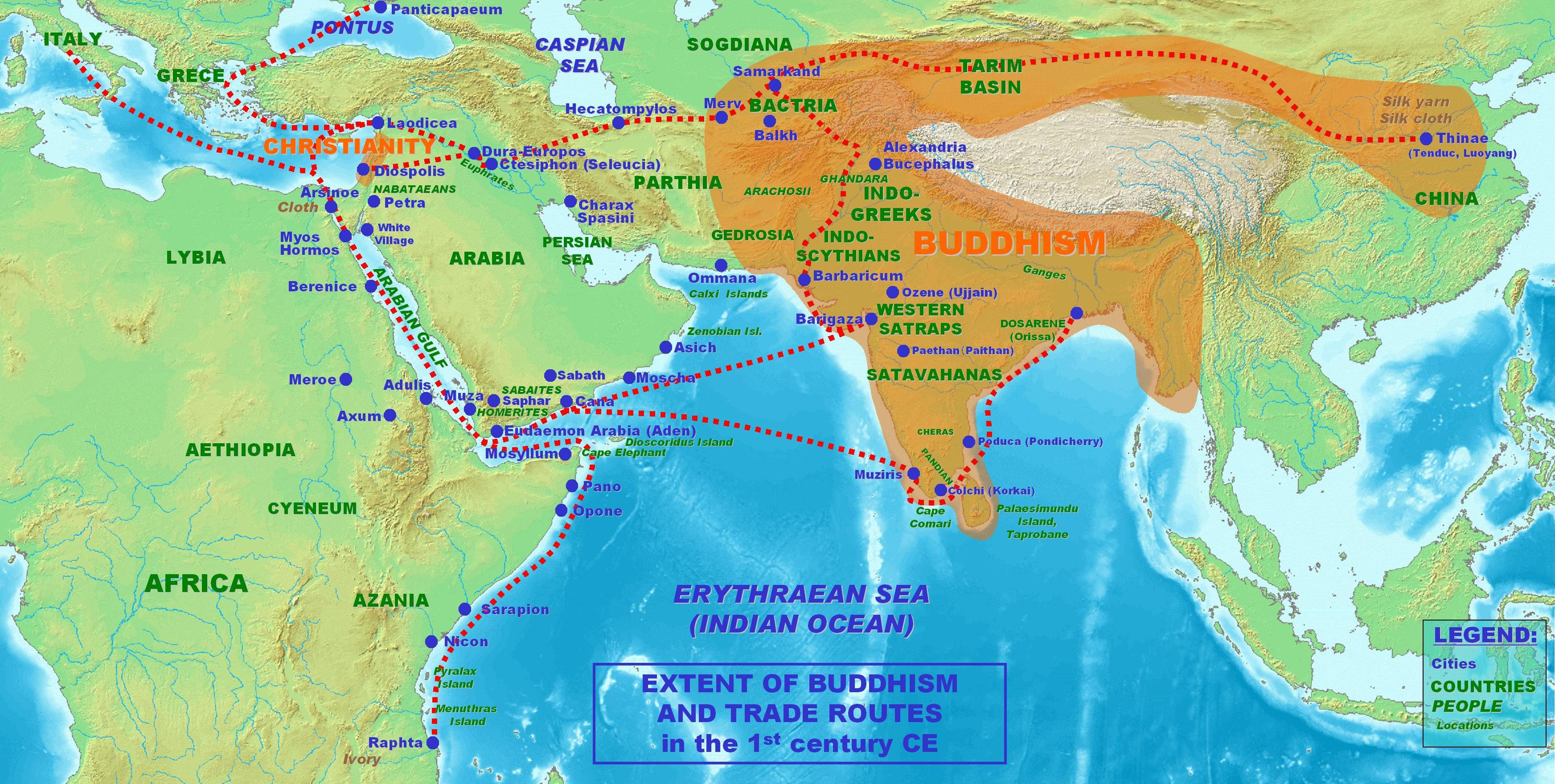
Extent of Buddhism and trade routes in the 1st century CE

Central Asia was home to the international trade route known as the Silk Road, which carried goods between China, India, the Middle East and the Mediterranean world. Buddhism was present in this region from about the second century BCE. Initially, the Dharmaguptaka school was the most successful in their efforts to spread Buddhism in Central Asia. The Kingdom of Khotan was one of the earliest Buddhist kingdoms in the area and helped transmit Buddhism from India to China.

The Kushan Empire's unification of most of this area and their support of Buddhism allowed it to easily spread along the trade routes of the region throughout Central Asia. During the first century CE under the Kushans, the Sarvastivada school flourished in this region, some of the monks also bringing Mahayana teachings with them. Buddhism would eventually reach modern-day Pakistan, Kashmir, Afghanistan, Uzbekistan, Turkmenistan and Tajikistan. As Buddhism reached many of these lands, Buddhists began to translate and produce texts in the local languages, such as Khotanese (a Middle Iranian language), Sogdian (also Iranian), Uighur (Turkish), Tangut, Tibetan, and Chinese.

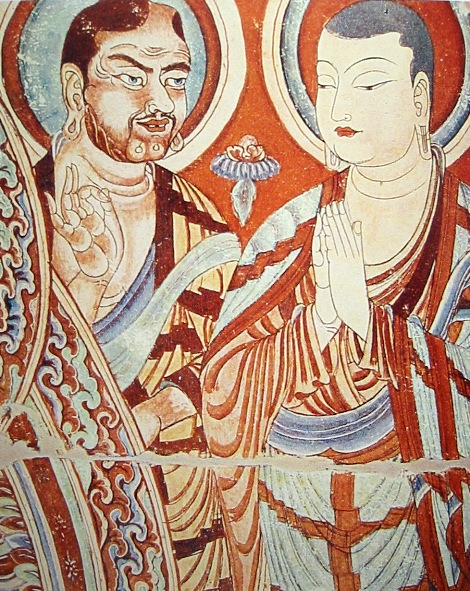
Blue-eyed Central Asian and East-Asian Buddhist monks, Bezeklik, 9th–10th centuries

Central Asians played a key role in the transmission of Buddhism to China. The first translators of Buddhists scriptures into Chinese were Iranians, including the Parthian An Shigao (c. 148 CE), the Yuezhi Zhi Qian and Kang Sengkai (from Samarkand). Thirty-seven early translators of Buddhist texts are known, and the majority of them have been identified as hailing from the Iranian cultural sphere. The Zoroastrian Sassanian Empire (224–651 CE) would eventually rule over many of these regions (such as Parthia and Sogdia), but they tolerated the Buddhist religion.

However, during the mid-seventh century, the Arab conquest of Persia followed by the Muslim conquests of Afghanistan and the later establishment of the Ghaznavid Empire in Central Asia (c. 977–1186) led to the decline and eventual disappearance of Buddhism from most of these regions.

Buddhism also flourished in the eastern part of central Asia, like the Tarim Basin. Indians and Iranians lived in major cities of this region like Kashgar and Khotan. The region has revealed extremely rich Buddhist works of art as well as Buddhist texts such as those found in Dunhuang. Serindian art is highly reminiscent of the Gandhāran style, and scriptures in the Gandhāri script Kharoṣṭhī have been found. The Uyghurs conquered the area in the 8th century and blended with the local Iranian peoples, absorbing the Buddhist culture of the region. They were later absorbed by the Mongol Yuan dynasty.

Many printed Buddhist texts from the region date to the Yuan, and they were printed in the Uyghur, Xixia and Sanskrit languages. The Uyghurs also restored cave temples and repainted Buddhist wall paintings such as at Bezeklik. Uyghur Buddhism was the last major Buddhist culture in Xinjiang and it lasted until the mid 14th century. After the Islamicisation of Xinjiang, Buddhism ceased to be a major religion there.

== Gupta and Pāla eras ==
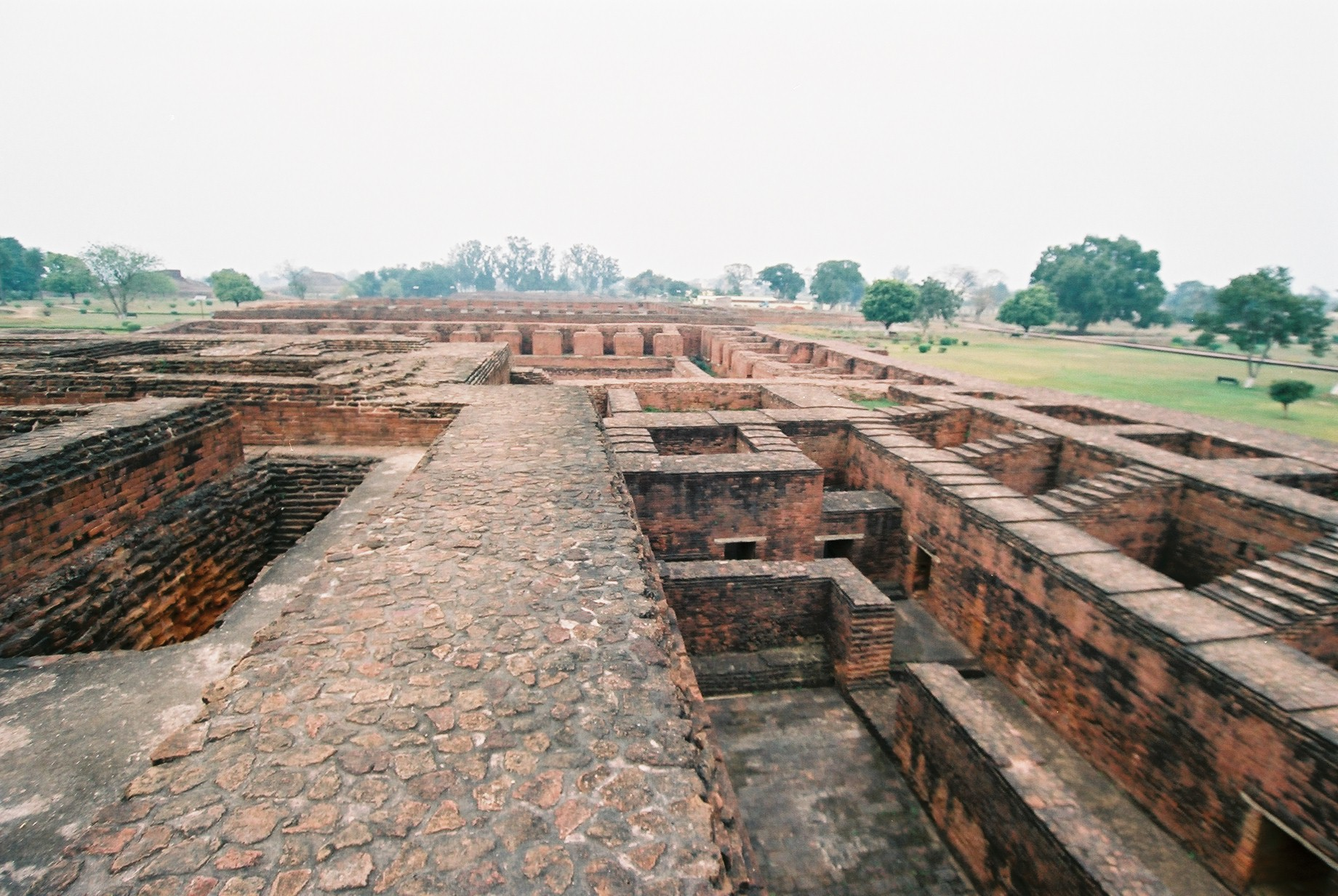
Ruins of the Buddhist Nālandā complex, a major center of learning in India from the 5th century CE to c. 1200 CE

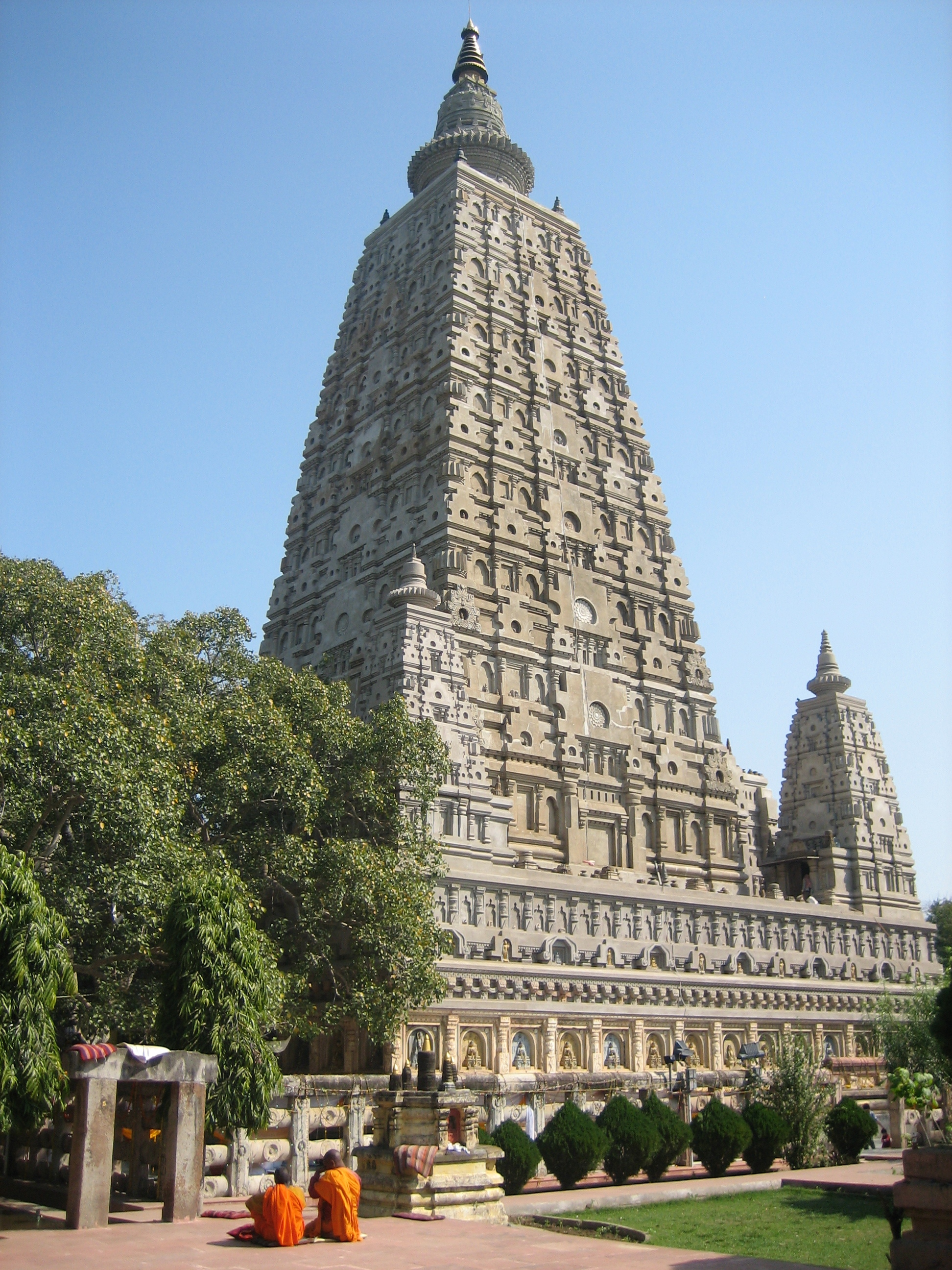
The current structure of the Mahabodhi Temple at Bodh Gaya dates to the Gupta era, 5th century CE.

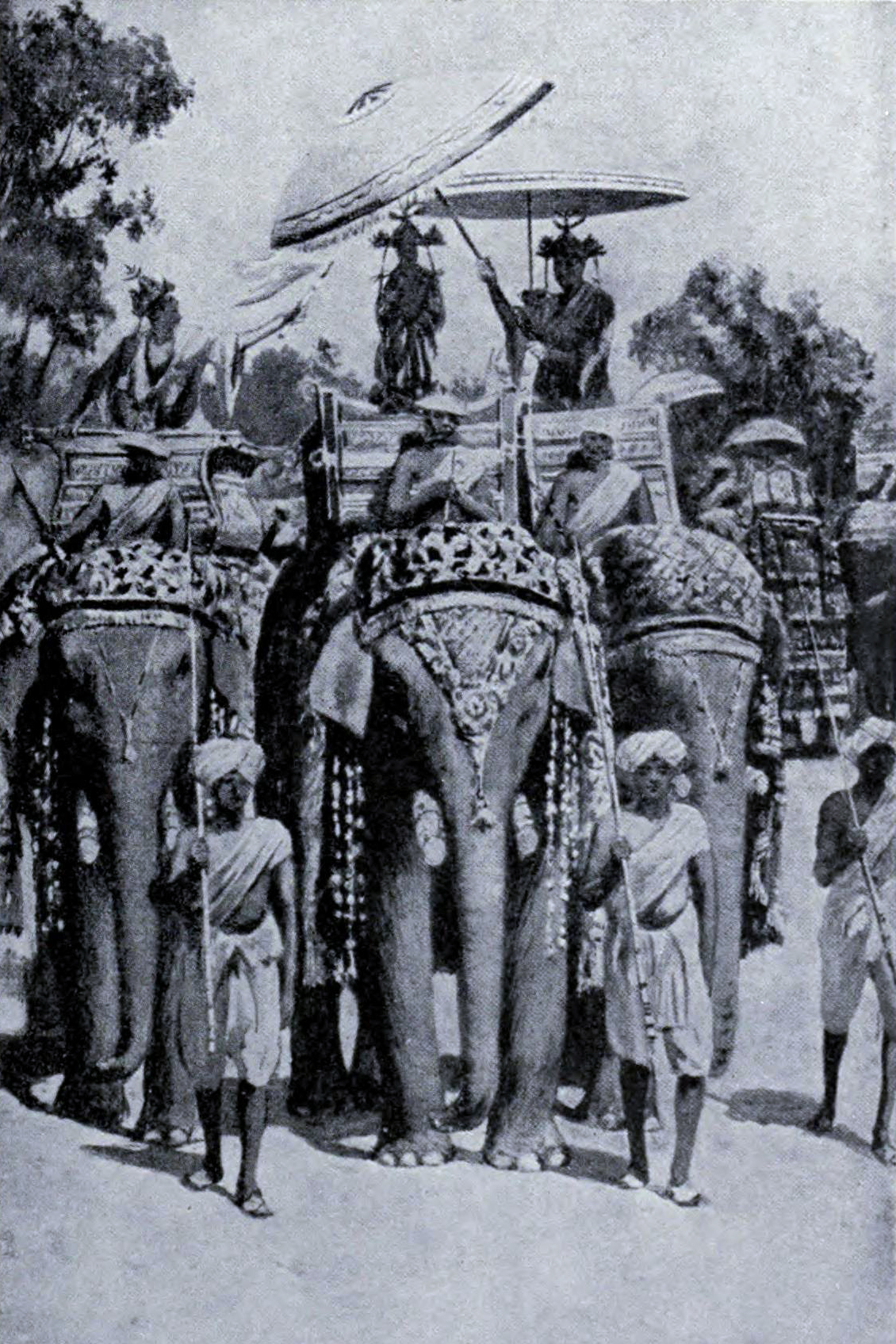
"King Harsha pays homage to Buddha", a 20th-century artist's imagination

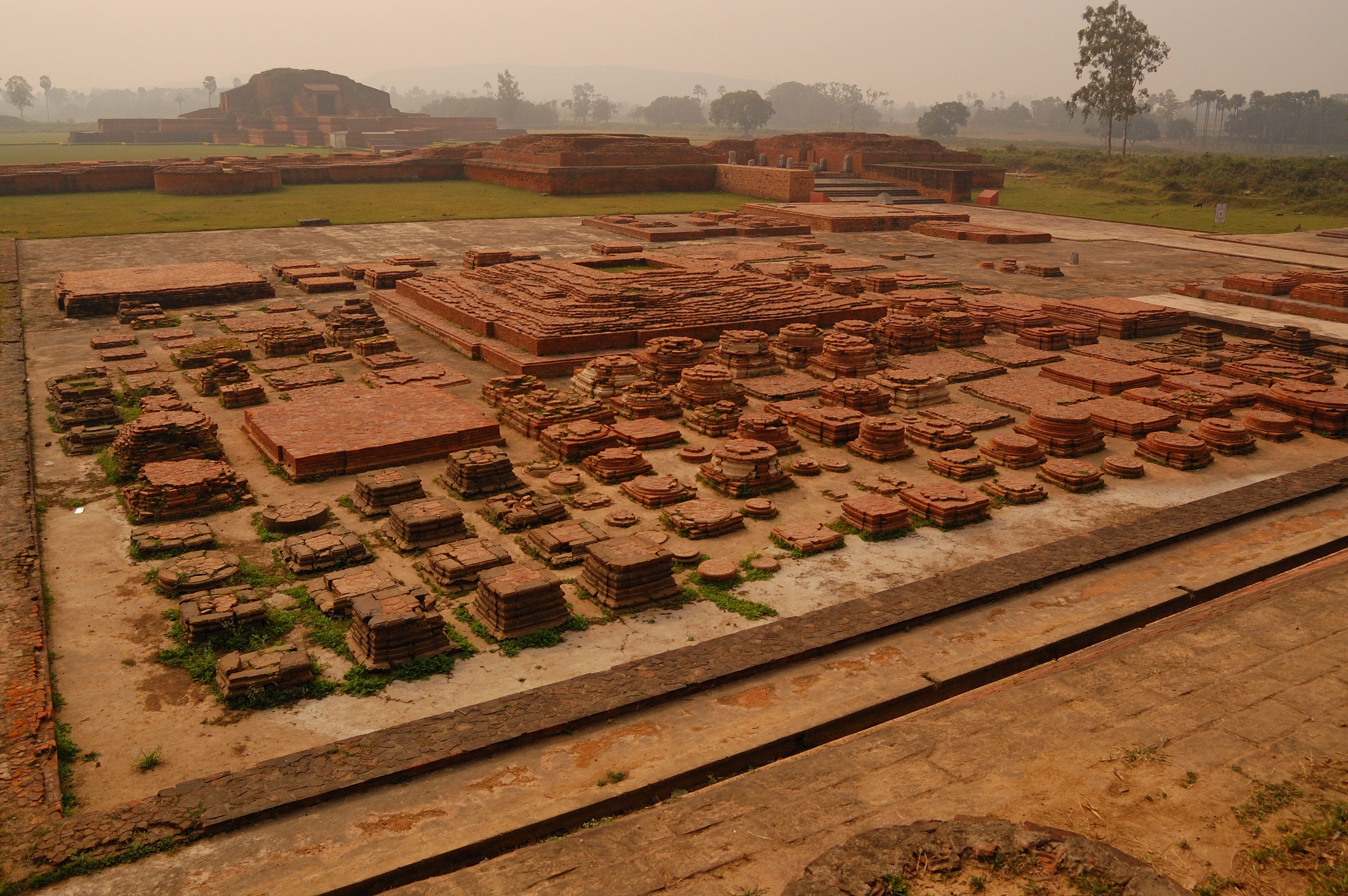
Landscape of Vikramashila university ruins, the seating, and meditation area. It was one of the most important centers of learning, during the Pala Empire, established by Emperor Dharmapala. Atiśa, the renowned pandita, is sometimes listed as a notable abbot.

Buddhism continued to flourish in India during the Gupta Empire (4th–6th centuries) which brought order to much of north India. Gupta rulers such as Kumaragupta I (c. 414–455 CE) supported Buddhism. He enlarged Nālandā university, which became the largest and most influential Buddhist university in India for many centuries. Great Buddhist philosophers like Dignaga, and Dharmakirti taught philosophy there. Nalanda remained a central place for the study of epistemology (pramana).

Another major Buddhist university was Valabhi, in western India, which was second only to Nalanda in the 5th century. This influential university was founded and supported by the Maitraka dynasty. It was mainly a center of sravakayana Buddhism (that is, non-Mahayana), but was also a place for the study of numerous subjects including secular topics of higher education (such as medicine, logic and grammar).

The influence of the Gupta style of Buddhist art spread along with the faith from Southeast Asia to China. During this period, Chinese pilgrims also visited India to study Buddhism.

One of these pilgrims was Faxian, who visited India during the reign of the Gupta emperor Chandragupta II in 405, and commented on the prosperity and mild administration of the Gupta Empire. Another Chinese traveler who reached India after the end of the Guptas in the 7th century was Xuanzang. He reported in his travels across India that Buddhism was popular in Andhra Pradesh and Tamil Nadu. While reporting many deserted stupas in the area around modern day Nepal and the persecution of Buddhists by Shashanka in the Kingdom of Gauda in modern-day West Bengal, Xuanzang complimented the patronage of emperor Harṣavardana (c. 590–647 CE). Xuanzang also noted that in various regions Buddhism was giving way to Jainism and Hinduism.

After the fall of Harsha's empire, the Gangetic plain saw the rise of many small feuding kingdoms. This was to last until the rise of the Pāla Empire (8th–12th centuries) in the Bengal region. The Pālas were stanch supporters of Buddhism, and built several important Buddhist centers, such as Vikramashila, Somapura and Odantapuri. They also supported older centers like Nalanda and Bodh Gaya. It was at these great Buddhist centers that scholars developed the philosophies of Vajrayana, Abhidharma, Madhyamaka, Yogacara and Pramana, as well as the study of linguistics, medicine, astronomy, music, painting, and sculpture. Great Buddhist scholars such as Atisha and Santaraksita date from this period. Under the Pālas, Vajrayana Buddhism thus flourished and spread to Tibet, Bhutan and Sikkim.

A milestone in the decline of Indian Buddhism in the North occurred in 1193 when Turkic Islamic raiders under Muhammad Khilji burnt Nālandā. By the end of the 12th century, following the Islamic conquest of the Buddhist strongholds in Bihar and Bengal by Delhi Sultanate's Muhammad bin Bakhtiyar Khalji, and the loss of political support coupled with social pressures, the practice of Buddhism retreated to the Himalayan foothills in the North and Sri Lanka in the south. Additionally, the influence of Buddhism also waned due to Hinduism's revival movements such as Advaita, and the rise of the bhakti movement.

=== Vajrayāna ===
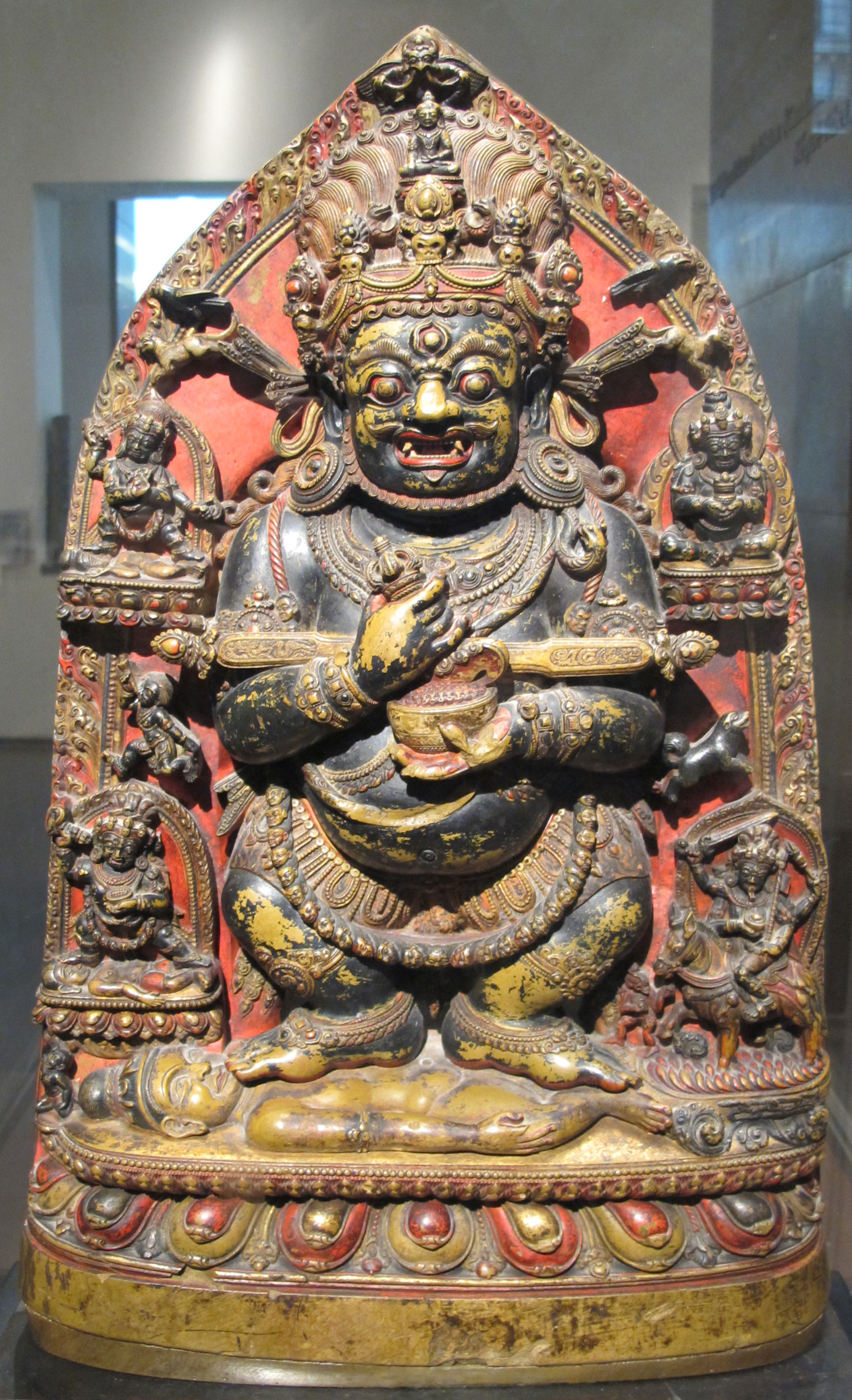
A Tantric Buddhist statue of Mahakala, holding a flaying knife (kartika) and skullcup (kapala).

Under the Gupta and Pala empires, a Tantric Buddhist movement arose, variously named Vajrayāna, Mantrayāna, Tantric Buddhism and Esoteric Buddhism. It promoted new practices such as the use of mantras, dharanis, mudras, mandalas and the visualization of deities and Buddhas and developed a new class of literature, the Buddhist Tantras. The movement can be traced back to groups of wandering yogis called mahasiddhas.

Various classes of Vajrayana literature developed as a result of royal courts sponsoring both Buddhism and Saivism, especially the Buddhist Yogini tantras. The Mañjusrimulakalpa, which later came to classified under Kriyatantra, states that mantras taught in the Shaiva, Garuda and Vaishnava tantras will be effective if applied by Buddhists since they were all taught originally by Manjushri. The Guhyasiddhi of Padmavajra, a work associated with the Guhyasamaja tradition, prescribes acting as a Shaiva guru and initiating members into Saiva Siddhanta scriptures and mandalas. The Samvara tantra texts adopted the pitha list from the Shaiva text Tantrasadbhava, introducing a copying error where a deity was mistaken for a place.

=== Tibetan Buddhism ===
Buddhism arrived late in Tibet, during the 7th century. The form that predominated, via the south of Tibet, was a blend of mahāyāna and vajrayāna from the universities of the Pāla empire of the Bengal region in eastern India. Sarvāstivādin influence came from the south west (Kashmir) and the north west (Khotan). Their texts found their way into the Tibetan Buddhist canon, providing the Tibetans with almost all of their primary sources about the Foundation Vehicle. A subsect of this school, Mūlasarvāstivāda was the source of the Tibetan Vinaya. Chan Buddhism was introduced via east Tibet from China and left its impression, but was rendered of lesser importance by early political events.

From the outset, Buddhism was opposed by the native shamanistic Bon religion, which had the support of the aristocracy, but with royal patronage, it thrived to a peak under King Rälpachän(817–836). Terminology in translation was standardised around 825, enabling a translation methodology that was highly literal. Despite a reversal in Buddhist influence which began under King Langdarma (836–842), the following centuries saw a colossal effort in collecting available Indian sources, many of which are now extant only in Tibetan translation. Tibetan Buddhism was favored above other religions by the rulers of imperial Chinese and Mongol Yuan Dynasty (1271–1368).

== East Asian Buddhism ==
=== China ===
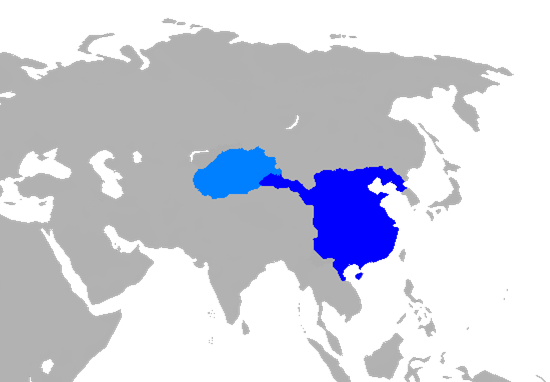
Extent of the Han Empire

Buddhism was introduced in China during the Han dynasty (206 BCE – 220 CE) and was present by around 50 CE. Although the archaeological record confirms that Buddhism was introduced sometime during the Han dynasty, it did not flourish in China until the Six Dynasties period (220–589 CE). The first documented Buddhist texts translated into Chinese are those of the Parthian An Shigao (148–180 CE). The first known Mahāyāna scriptural texts are translations into Chinese by the Kushan monk Lokakṣema in Luoyang, between 178 and 189 CE. Early translators faced the difficulty of communicating foreign Buddhist concepts to the Chinese, and often used Taoist terminology to explain them. This has been called "concept-matching". Later translators such as Kumārajīva (334–413 CE) improved the translation methods of Chinese Buddhism considerably.

Some of the earliest known Buddhist artifacts found in China are small statues on "money trees", dated c. 200 CE, in typical Gandhāran drawing style. In the period between 460 and 525 CE during the Northern Wei dynasty, the Chinese-constructed Yungang Grottoes, and the Longmen Grottoes, which include some impressive monumental sculptures. In the fifth century, Chinese Buddhists also developed new schools and traditions, such as the Tiantai school, the Huayen school, the Pure Land school and Chan Buddhism.

Buddhism continued to grow during the early Tang dynasty (618–907). It was during this dynasty that the Chinese monk Xuanzang traveled to India, bringing back 657 Buddhist texts along with relics and statues. He established a famed translation school in the Tang capital of Chang'an (today's Xi'an), focusing on Yogacara school texts. Also during the Tang, Chinese Esoteric Buddhism was introduced from India. The Tang dynasty also saw the growth of Chan Buddhism (Zen), with the great Zen masters such as Mazu Daoyi and Linji Yixuan. In the later Tang, Chinese Buddhism suffered a setback during the Great Anti-Buddhist Persecution of 845.

Buddhism recovered during the Song dynasty (960–1279), which is known as the "golden age" of Chan. During this period Chinese Chan influenced Korean and Japanese Buddhism. Pure Land Buddhism also became popular during this period and was often practiced together with Chan. It was also during the Song that the entire Chinese Buddhist canon was printed using over 130,000 wooden printing blocks.

During the Yuan dynasty, Tibetan Buddhism became the state religion. During the Ming (1368–1644), the Chan school became the dominant tradition in China and all monks were affiliated with Chan. In the 17th century, Buddhism was spread to Taiwan by Chinese immigrants.

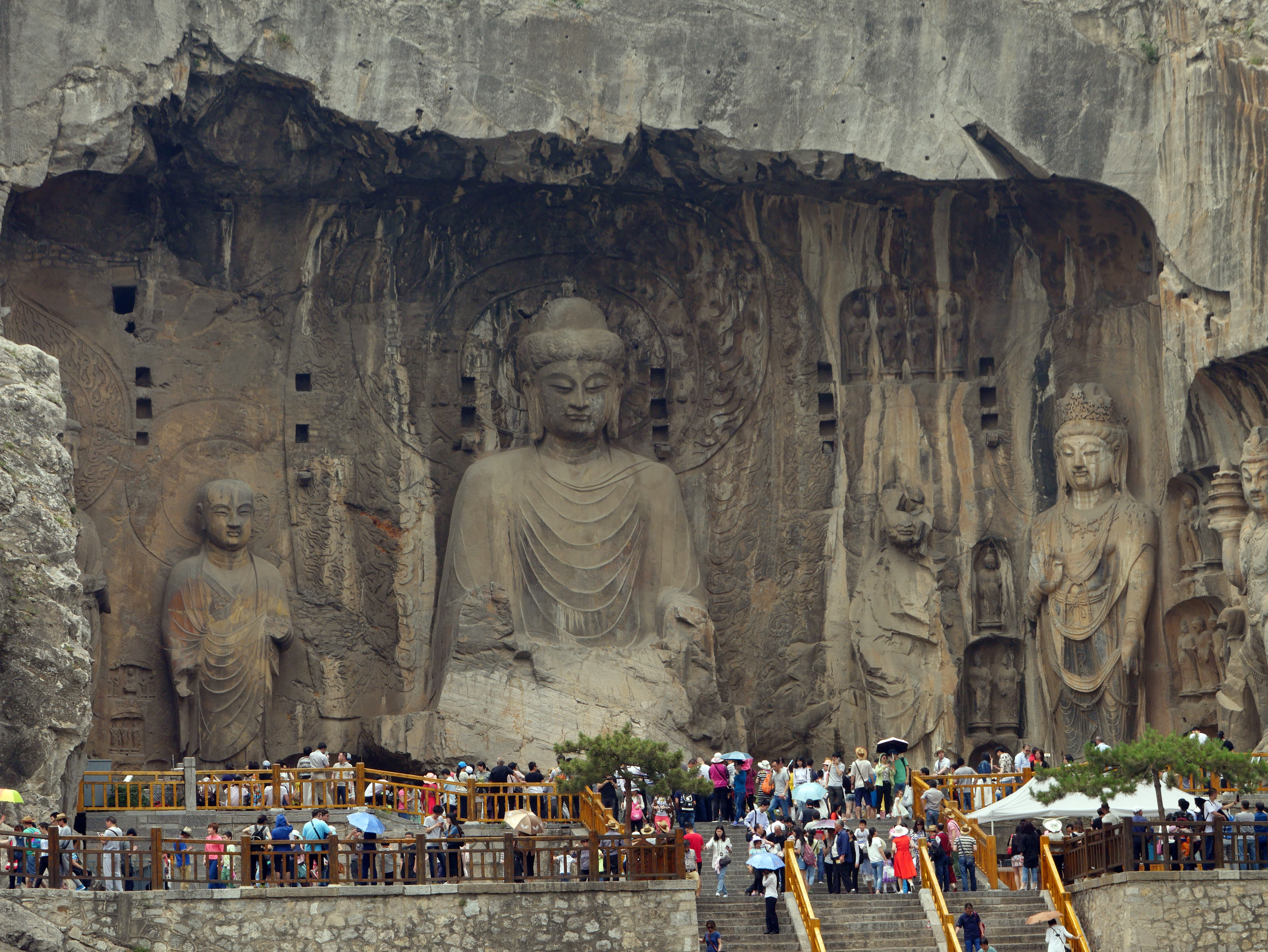
Massive statues at Longmen Grottoes, Henan province, China

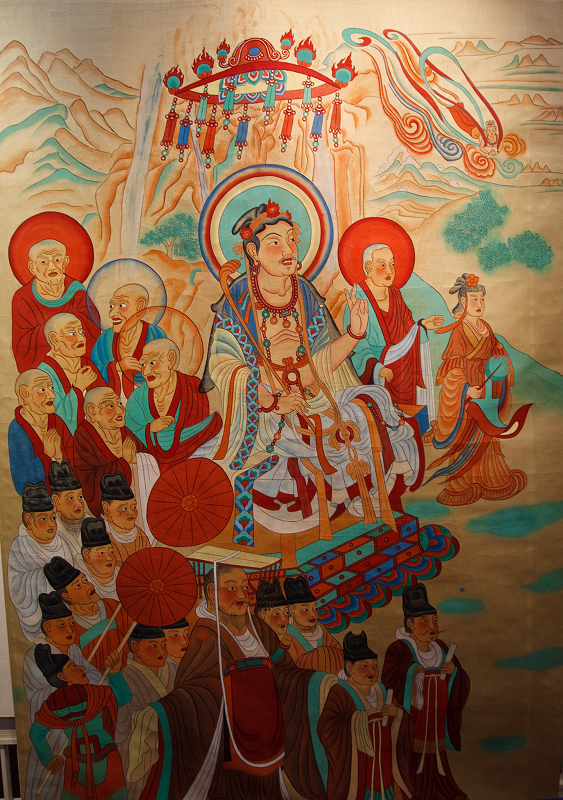
Manjusri Bodhisattva debates Vimalakirti. Scene from the Vimalakirti Nirdesa Sutra. Dunhuang, Mogao Caves, China, Tang Dynasty.

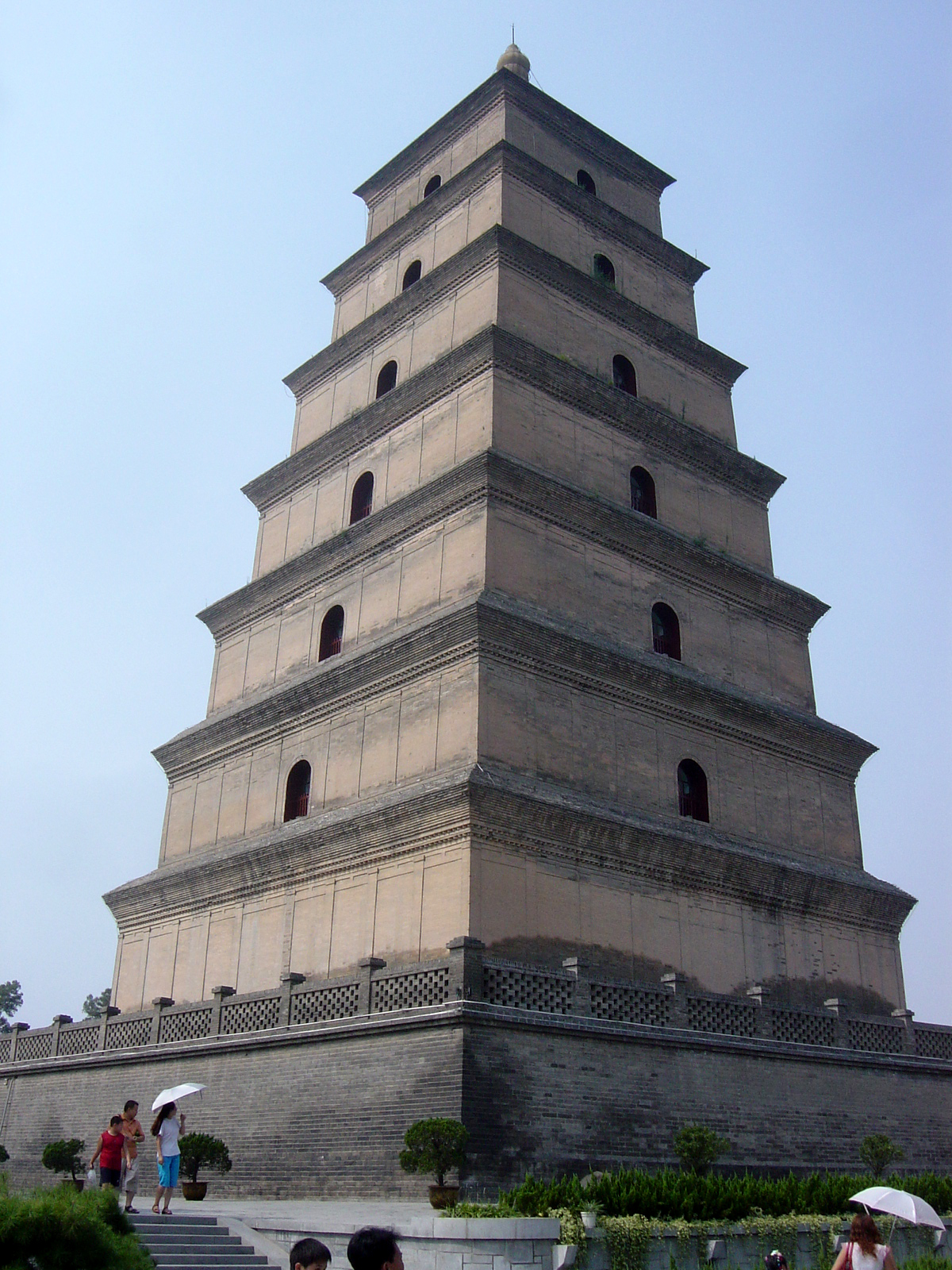
Giant Wild Goose Pagoda in Xi'an, 704 CE

=== Vietnam ===
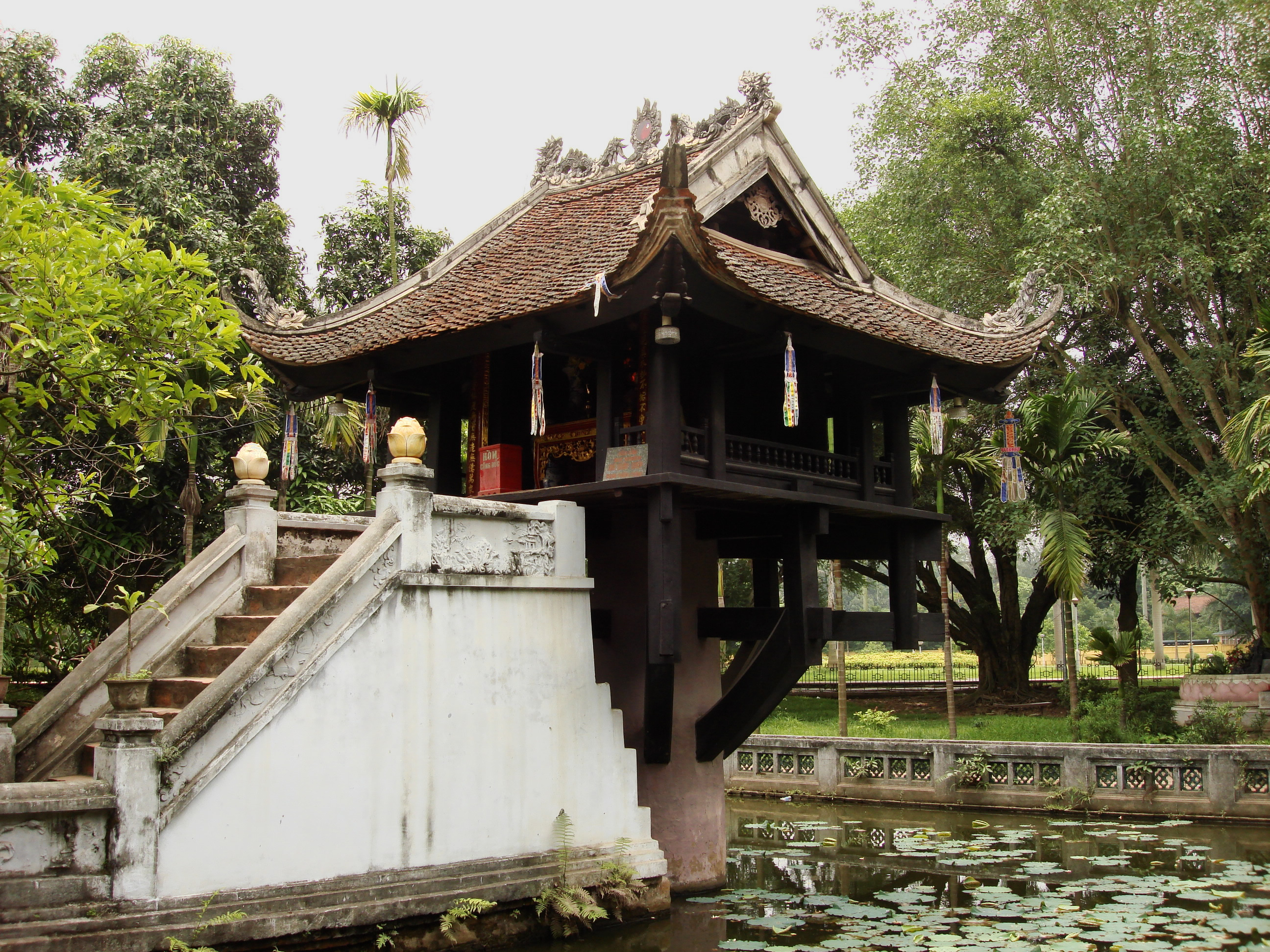
The One Pillar Pagoda is a historic Mahayana Buddhist temple in Hanoi, the capital of Vietnam.

There is disagreement on when exactly Buddhism arrived in Vietnam. Buddhism may have arrived as early as the 3rd or 2nd century BCE via India, or alternatively during the 1st or 2nd century from China. Whatever the case, Mahayana Buddhism had been established by the second century CE in Vietnam. By the 9th century, both Pure Land and Thien (Zen) were major Vietnamese Buddhist schools. In the southern Kingdom of Champa, Hinduism, Theravada, and Mahayana were all practiced until the 15th century, when an invasion from the north led to the dominance of Chinese-based forms of Buddhism. However Theravada Buddhism continues to exist in the south of Vietnam. Vietnamese Buddhism is thus very similar to Chinese Buddhism and to some extent reflects the structure of Chinese Buddhism after the Song dynasty. Vietnamese Buddhism also has a symbiotic relationship with Taoism, Chinese spirituality and the native Vietnamese religion.

=== Korea ===
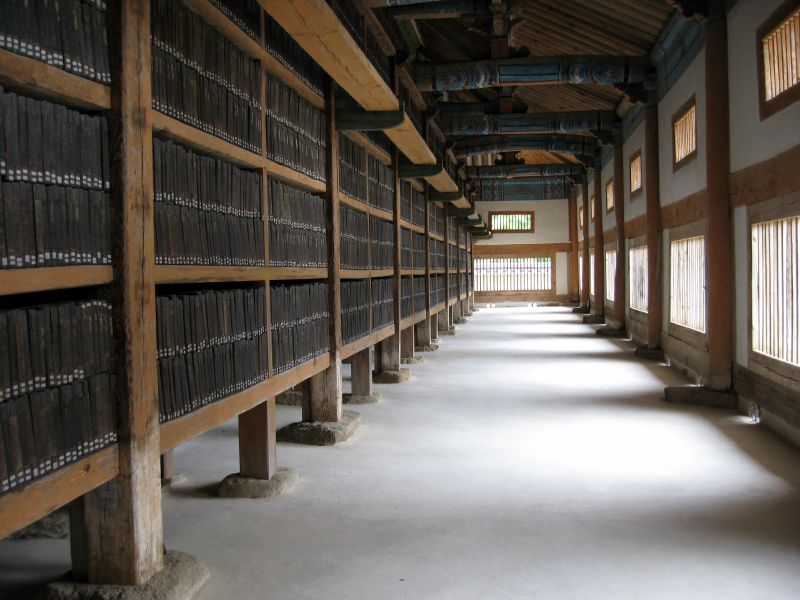
The Tripiṭaka Koreana in storage at Haeinsa, South Korea

Buddhism was introduced to the Three Kingdoms of Korea beginning around 372 CE. During the 6th century, many Korean monks traveled to China and India to study Buddhism and various Korean Buddhist schools developed. Buddhism prospered in Korea during the North–South States Period (688–926) when it became a dominant force in society. Buddhism continued to be popular in the Goryeo period (918–1392), in particular Seon (Zen) Buddhism. However, during the Confucian Yi dynasty of the Joseon period, Buddhism faced a reversal of fortunes beginning with the confiscation of monastery lands, the closing of monasteries and the ban on ordination by aristocrats in the 15th century.

=== Japan ===
Daibutsu (Great Buddha), Kamakura

Buddhism was introduced to Japan in the 6th century by Korean monks bearing sutras and an image of the Buddha. During the Nara Period (710–794), emperor Shōmu ordered the building of temples throughout his realm. Numerous temples and monasteries were built in the capital city of Nara, such as the five-story pagoda and Golden Hall of the Hōryū-ji, or the Kōfuku-ji temple. There was also a proliferation of Buddhist sects in the capital city of Nara, known as the Nanto Rokushū (the Six Nara Sects). The most influential of these being the Kegon school (from the Chinese Huayan).

During the late Nara, the key figures of Kūkai (774–835) and Saichō (767–822) founded the influential Japanese schools of Shingon and Tendai, respectively. An important doctrine for these schools was hongaku (innate awakening or original enlightenment), a doctrine which was influential for all subsequent Japanese Buddhism. Buddhism also influenced the Japanese religion of Shinto, which incorporated Buddhist elements.

During the later Kamakura period (1185–1333), there were six new Buddhist schools founded which competed with the older Nara schools and are known as "New Buddhism" (Shin Bukkyō) or Kamakura Buddhism. They include the influential Pure Land schools of Hōnen (1133–1212) and Shinran (1173–1263), the Rinzai and Soto schools of Zen founded by Eisai (1141–1215) and Dōgen (1200–1253) as well as the Lotus Sutra school of Nichiren (1222–1282).

Japanese Buddhist art was especially productive between the 8th and 13th centuries during Nara period (710–794), Heian period (794–1185) and Kamakura period (1185–1333). Buddhism, especially Zen, remained culturally influential during the Ashikaga period (1333–1573) and the Tokugawa era (1603–1867).

=== Mongolia ===
The rulers of the nomadic empires such as the Xiongnu (209 BCE – 93 CE), Xianbei (93–234), Rouran Khaganate (late 4th c. – middle 6th c.) and the Göktürks (middle first mill. AD) received missionaries and built temples for them. Buddhism prevailed among aristocrats and was patronised by the monarchs of the Xianbei-led Northern Wei dynasty (386–535) and of the Khitan-led Liao dynasty (916–1125). The Khitans aristocracy regarded Buddhism as the culture of the Uyghur Khaganate that dominated the Mongolian steppes before the rise of the Liao dynasty. The monarchs of the Jurchen-led Jin dynasty (1115–1234) also regarded Buddhism as part of their culture.

Genghis Khan (c. 1162 – 1227) and his immediate successors conquered nearly all of Asia and European Russia and sent armies as far as central Europe and Southeast Asia. The emperors of the Yuan dynasty (1271–1368) in the 13th and 14th century converted to Tibetan Buddhism. The founder of the Yuan dynasty, Kublai Khan, invited lama Drogön Chögyal Phagpa of the Sakya school of Tibetan Buddhism to spread Buddhism throughout his realm (the second introduction of Buddhism among the Mongols). Buddhism became the de facto state religion of the Yuan dynasty. In 1269, Kublai Khan commissioned Phagpa lama to design a new writing system to unify the writing systems of the multilingual empire. The 'Phags-pa script, also known as the "Square script", was based on the Tibetan script and written vertically from top was designed to write in Mongolian, Tibetan, Chinese, Uighur and Sanskrit languages and served as the official script of the empire. The activities of the Mongols were conducive to the prominency of the Sakya school and then the Gelug, and to the further development of Tibeto-Mongolian culture.

The Mongols returned to shamanic traditions after the collapse of the Yuan dynasty in 1368 and during the Northern Yuan dynasty.

In 1578 Altan Khan, a Mongol military leader with ambitions to unite the Mongols and to emulate the career of Genghis Khan, invited the 3rd Dalai Lama, the head of the rising Gelug lineage to a summit. They formed an alliance that gave Altan Khan legitimacy and religious sanction for his imperial pretensions and that provided the Buddhist school with protection and patronage. Altan Khan recognized Sonam Gyatso lama as a reincarnation of Phagpa lama, gave the Tibetan leader the title of Dalai Lama ("Ocean Lama"), which his successors still hold. Sonam Gyatso, in turn, recognized Altan as a reincarnation of Kublai Khan. Thus, Altan added legitimacy to the title "khan" that he had assumed, while Sonam Gyatso received support for the supremacy he sought over the Tibetan sangha. Since this meeting, the heads of the Gelugpa school became known as Dalai Lamas. Altan Khan also bestowed the title Ochirdara (Очирдар, from Sanskr. Vajradhara) to Sonam Gyatso.

Altan Khan died soon after, but in the next century Gelug Buddhism spread throughout Mongolia.

== Southeast Asian Buddhism ==
Since around 500 BCE, the culture of India has exerted influence on Southeast Asian countries. Land and maritime trade routes linked India with the region and both Hindu and Buddhist beliefs became influential there during the period of the Indianization of Southeast Asia. For more than a thousand years, Indian influence was, therefore, the major factor that brought a certain level of cultural unity to the various countries of the region. The Pāli and Sanskrit languages and Indian scripts, together with Theravāda and Mahāyāna Buddhism, Brahmanism, and Hinduism, were transmitted from direct contact and through sacred texts and Indian literature such as the Rāmāyaṇa and the Mahābhārata.

From the 5th to the 13th centuries, Southeast Asia saw a series of powerful states which were extremely active in the promotion of Buddhism and Buddhist art alongside Hinduism. The main Buddhist influence now came directly by sea from the Indian subcontinent, so that these empires essentially followed the Mahāyāna faith. Examples include mainland kingdoms like Funan, the Khmer Empire and the Thai kingdom of Sukhothai as well as island kingdoms like the Kalingga Kingdom, the Srivijaya Empire, Mataram and Majapahit.

Buddhist monks traveled to China from the kingdom of Funan in the 5th century CE, bringing Mahayana texts, a sign that the religion was already established in the region by this point. Mahayana Buddhism and Hinduism were the main religions of the Khmer Empire (802–1431), a state that dominated most of the South-East Asian peninsula during its time. Under the Khmer, numerous temples, both Hindu and Buddhist, were built in Cambodia and in neighboring Thailand. One of the greatest Khmer kings, Jayavarman VII (1181–1219), built large Mahāyāna Buddhist structures at Bayon and Angkor Thom.

In the Indonesian island of Java, Indianized kingdoms like the Kalingga Kingdom (6–7th centuries) were destinations for Chinese monks seeking out Buddhist texts. The Malay Srivijaya (650–1377), a maritime empire centered on the island of Sumatra, adopted Mahāyāna and Vajrayāna Buddhism and spread Buddhism to Java, Malaya and other regions they conquered.

The Chinese Buddhist Yijing described their capital at Palembang as a great center of Buddhist learning where the emperor supported over a thousand monks at his court. Yijing also testified to the importance of Buddhism as early as the year 671 and advised future Chinese pilgrims to spend a year or two in Palembang. Atiśa studied there before travelling to Tibet as a missionary. As Srivijaya expanded, Buddhism thrived and also became part of a local syncretism that incorporated several different religions such as Hinduism and other indigenous traditions.

In the island of Java, another kingdom also promoted Mahayana Buddhist culture, the Mataram kingdom (732–1006), a major rival of Srivijaya. They are known for their monumental temple construction, especially the massive Borobudur, as well as Kalasan, Sewu, and Prambanan. Indonesian Buddhism, alongside Hinduism, continued to thrive under the Majapahit Empire (1293–1527), but was completely replaced by Islam afterward.

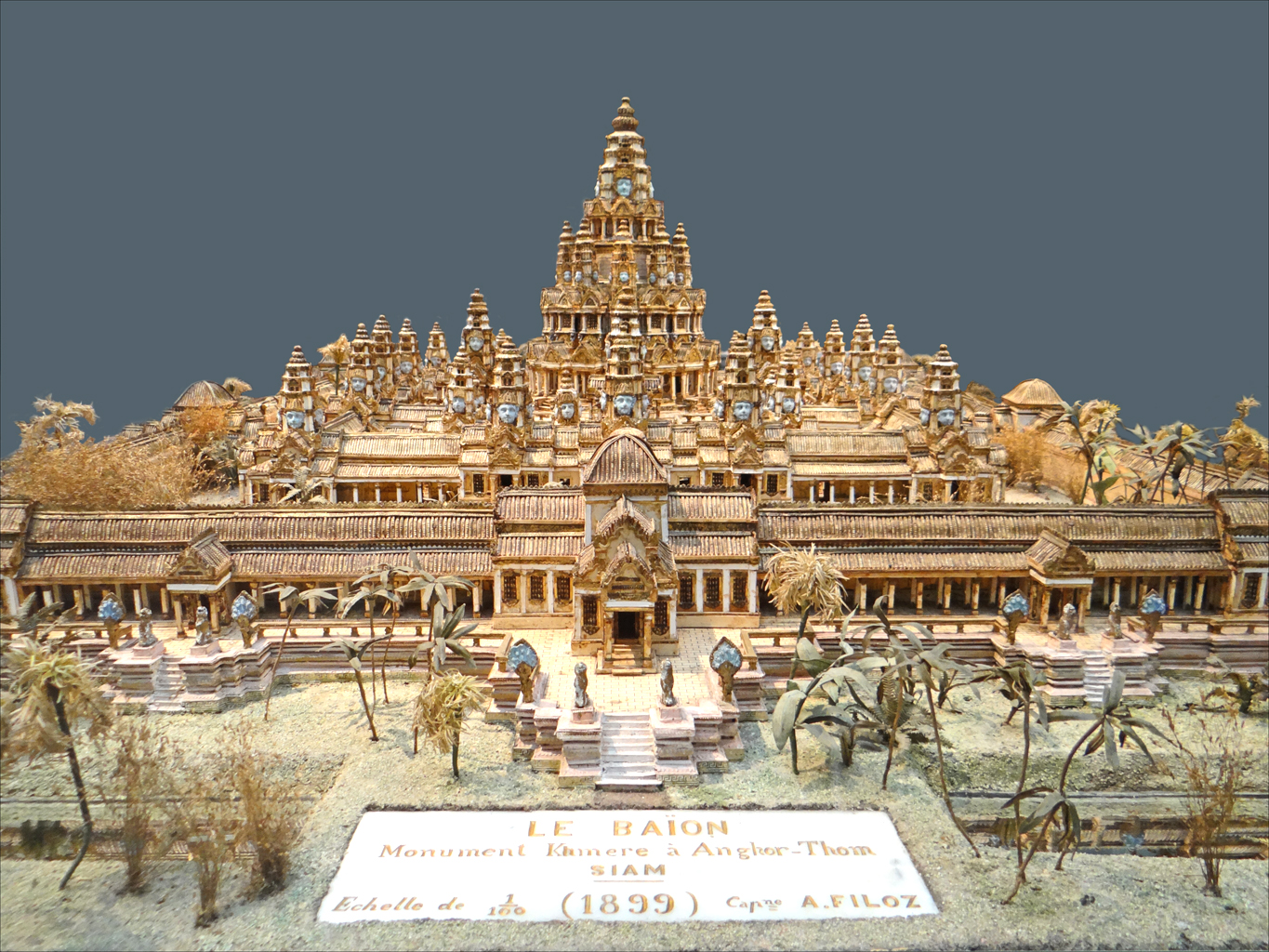
Reconstruction of the Prasat Bayon Temple, at the center of Angkor Thom.

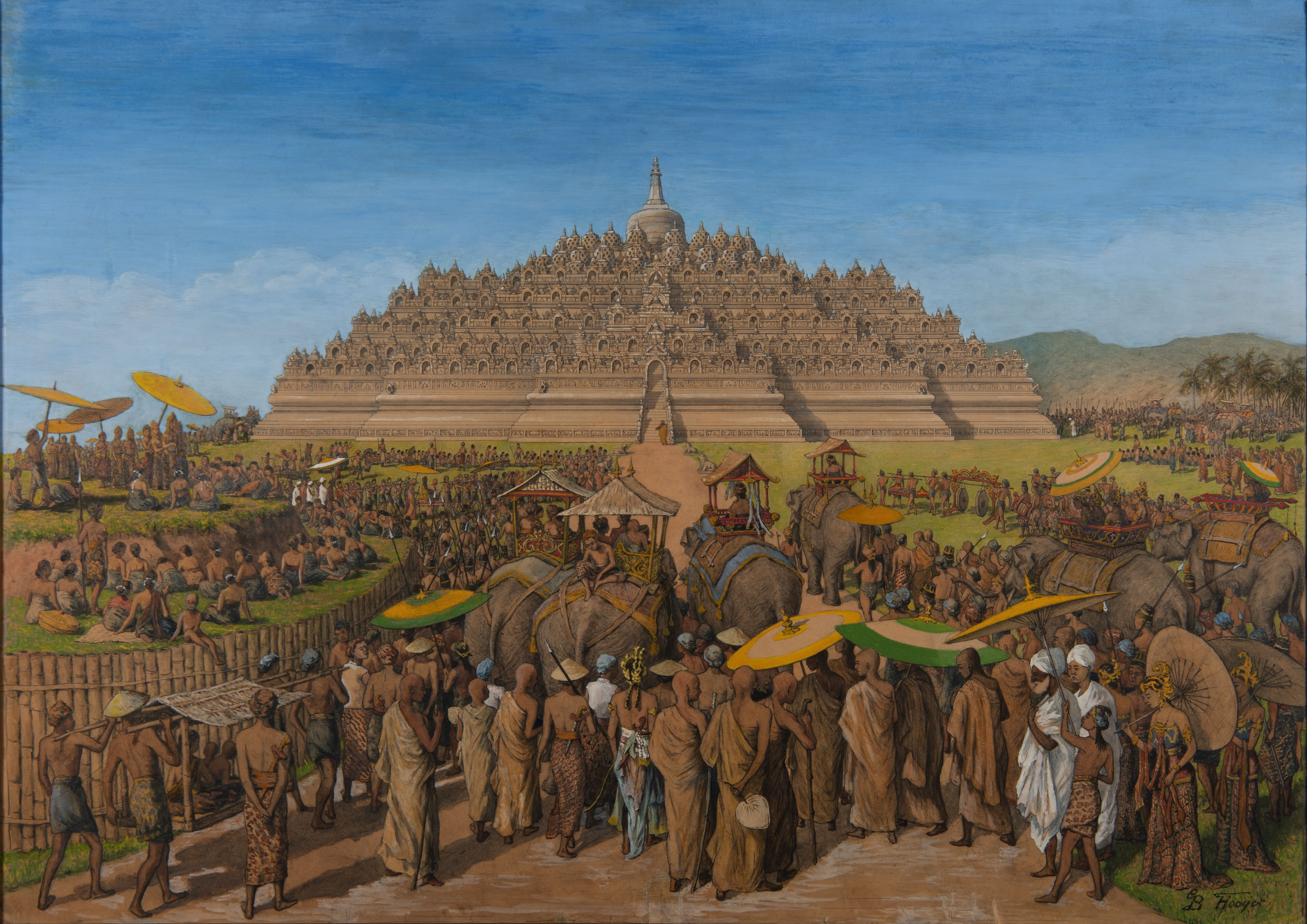
A painting by G.B. Hooijer (c. 1916–1919) reconstructing the scene of Borobudur, during its heyday.

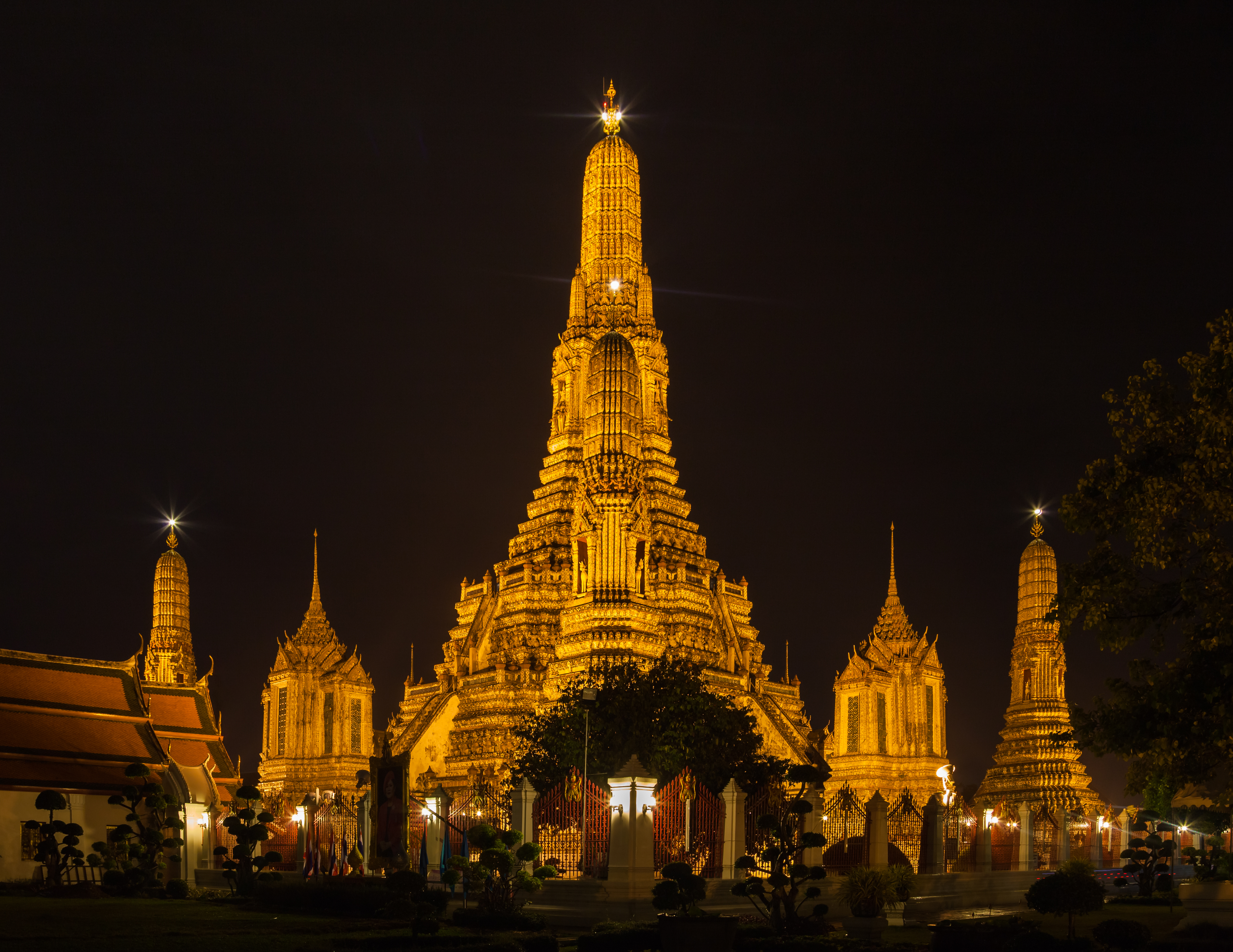
Buddhist temple of Wat Arun in Bangkok, Thailand.

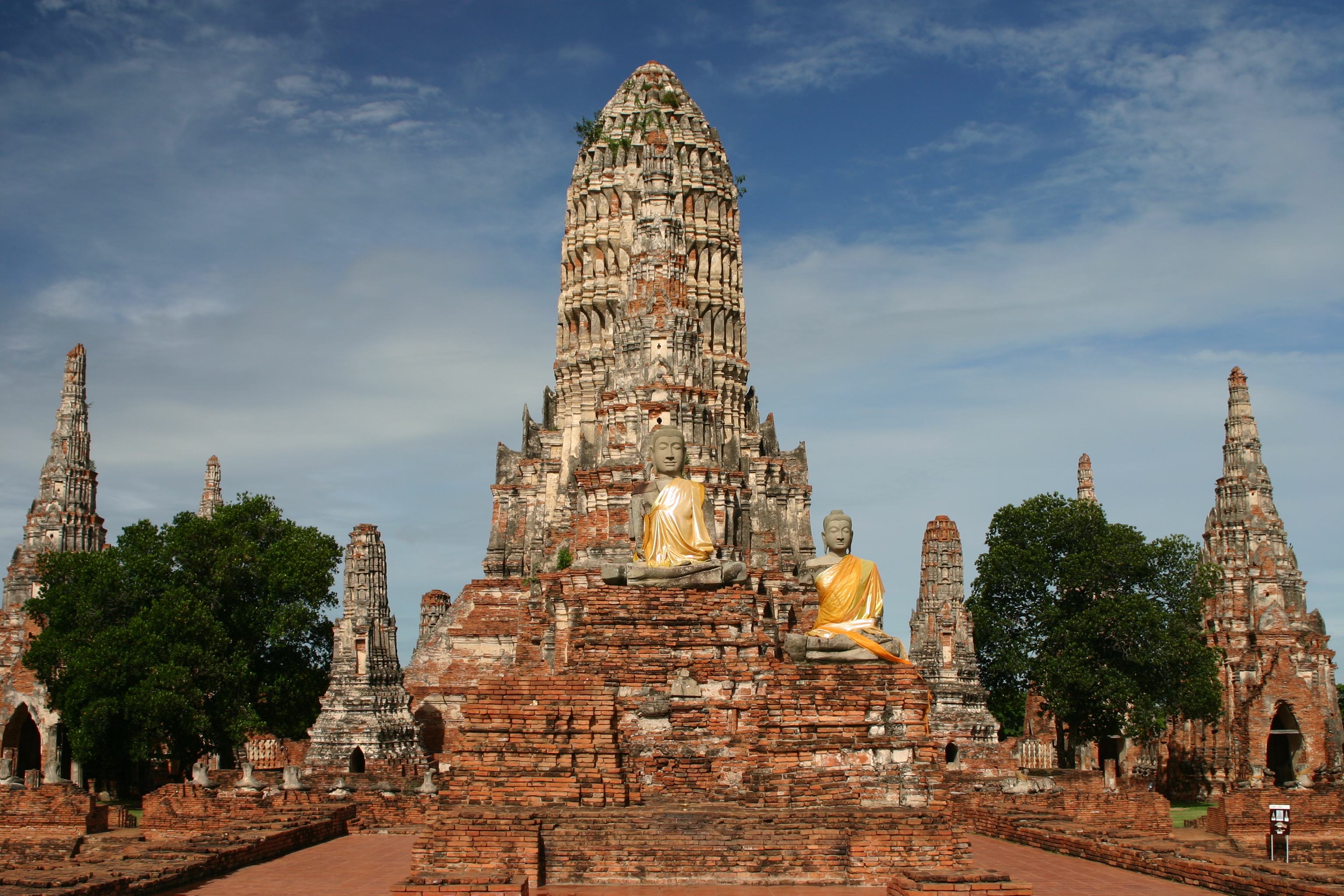
Wat Chaiwatthanaram, one of the Ayutthaya Kingdom's best-known temples, Thailand.

=== Theravāda Renaissance ===
The lands of the Mon and Pyu peoples in Myanmar show extensive evidence of Theravada presence in the Irrawaddy and Chao Phraya basins from the 5th century CE onwards. Theravada Buddhism in Burma initially coexisted with other forms of Buddhism and other religions. After the decline of Buddhism in the Indian mainland, Theravada Buddhist monks from Sri Lanka mounted missionary efforts in Burma, Thailand, Cambodia, and Laos, and they were successful in converting all these regions to Theravada Buddhism.

King Anawrahta (1044–1078); the founder of the Pagan Empire, adopted the Theravādin Buddhist faith from Sri Lanka, building numerous Buddhist temples at his capital of Pagan. Invasions from the Burmese and the Mongols weakened Theravada in this region and it had to be reintroduced from Sri Lanka. During the Mon Hanthawaddy kingdom (1287–1552), Theravada Buddhism was the dominant religion in Burma, with strong ties to Sri Lankan Buddhism. One of their kings, Dhammazedi, is particularly known for his reformation of Burmese Buddhism from the Sri Lankan Mahavihara tradition between 1476 and 1479. Theravada remained the official religion of the subsequent Burmese Taungoo Dynasty (1510–1752).

During the reign of the Khmer King Jayavarman VII (r. c. 1181–1218), Theravada Buddhism was promoted by the royal family and Sri Lankan monks, including his son Tamalinda who himself had traveled to Sri Lanka. During the 13th and 14th centuries, Theravada became the dominant religion of Cambodia, and monasteries replaced the local priestly classes. The Theravāda faith was also adopted by the Thai kingdom of Sukhothai as the state religion during the reign of Ram Khamhaeng (1237/1247–1298). Theravāda Buddhism was further reinforced during the Ayutthaya period (14th–18th century), becoming an integral part of Thai society.

== Modern period ==
The modern era brought new challenges to the Buddhist religion such as the colonization of traditionally Buddhist Asian countries by Western states, which weakened the traditional political structures which supported the religion, as well as criticism and competition from Christianity. Modern wars, communist anti-religious pressure, the growth of capitalism, modern science and regional political instability are also influential pressures on modern Buddhism.

=== South and Southeast Asia ===
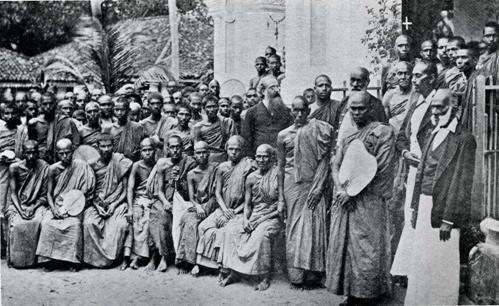
Henry Olcott and Buddhists (Colombo, 1883)

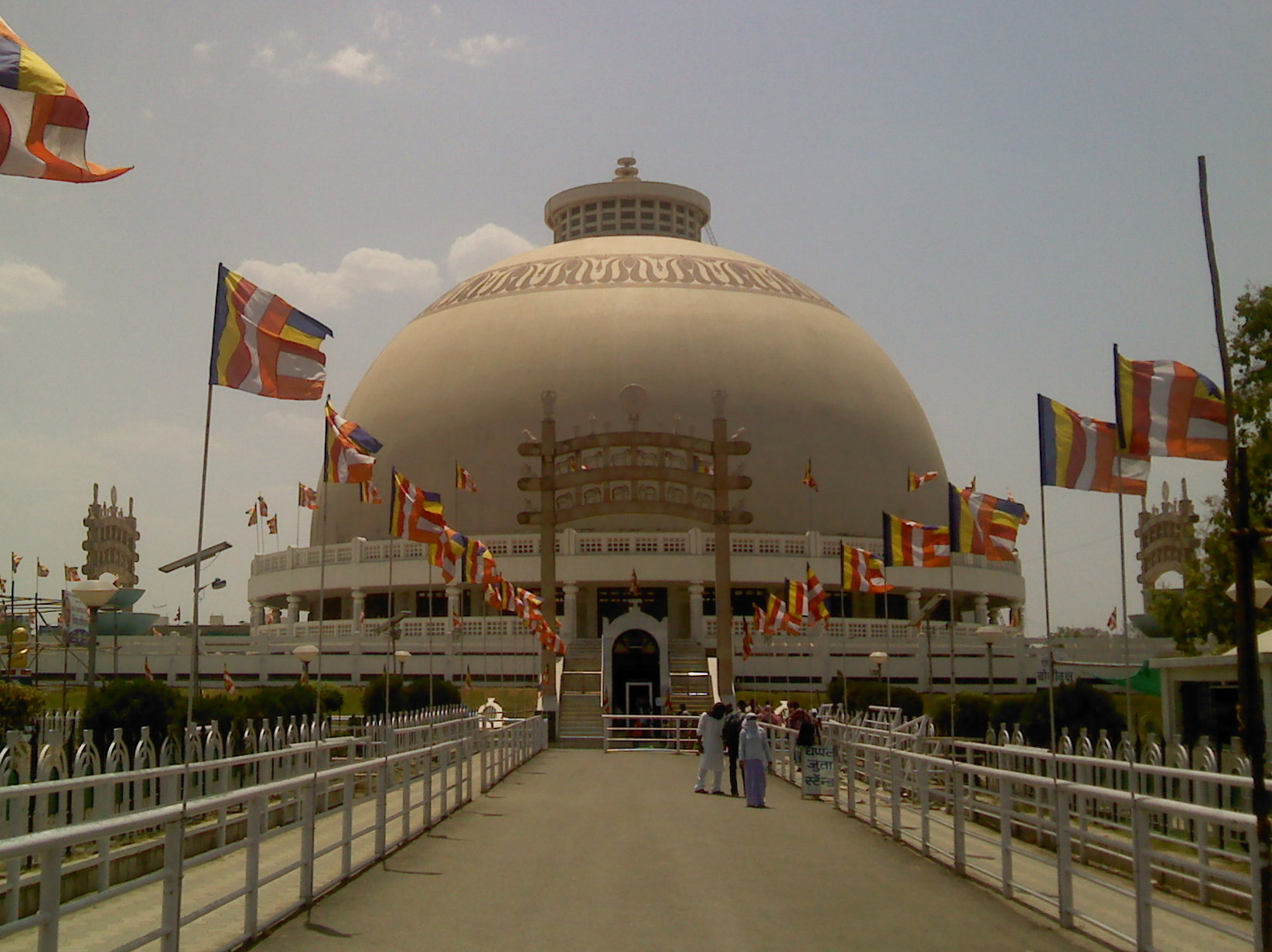
Deekshabhoomi monument, located in Nagpur, Maharashtra where B. R. Ambedkar converted to Buddhism in 1956, is the largest stupa in Asia.

In British Ceylon, Christian missionaries ran all the state-approved schools and commonly criticized Buddhist beliefs. By 1865, Buddhist monks began a counter movement against Christian attacks, printing pamphlets and debating Christians in public, such as at the famous Panadura debate in 1873, which saw the monk Gunananda win a debate in front of a crowd of 10,000.

During this period a new form of Buddhism began to take shape, termed Buddhist modernism (or sometimes "Protestant Buddhism"), which tended to see the Buddha from a humanist point of view and claimed that Buddhism was a rational and scientific religion. Important figures in this new movement include the American convert Henry Olcott (1832–1907) and Anagarika Dharmapala (1864–1933), who promoted Buddhist schools, lay organizations and the printing of newspapers. Dharmapala also founded the Mahā Bodhi Society to restore the dilapidated Indian site of Bodh Gaya. Dharmapala also traveled to the UK and the US to teach Buddhism.

This society helped usher in a revival of Buddhism in India, where Buddhism became popular among some Indian intellectuals. One of these was the lawyer B. R. Ambedkar (1891–1956), leader of the Dalit Buddhist movement, who urged low caste Indian Dalits to convert to Buddhism. Other Indian figures include Rahul Sankrityayan (1893–1963), Dharmanand Kosambi (1876–1941) and Bhadant Anand Kausalyayan.

In Burma, a central modern figure is King Mindon (r. 1853–1878), who convened the 5th Buddhist council (1868–71), where different editions of the Pali Canon were cross-checked and a final version was inscribed on 729 stone slabs, currently still the world's largest book. A new meditation movement arose in Burma, called the Vipassana movement, beginning with figures such as Medawi (1728–1816), who was instrumental in the promotion of Buddhist meditation practices. In 1956, Burmese politician U Nu presided over a sixth council, which saw monks from various Theravada countries produce another new edition of the Pali Canon. Recently, Buddhist monks have become involved in political protest movements such as the Saffron Revolution of 2007.

Thailand, which was the only country to avoid colonization, had two important Buddhist kings, who pushed for modernization and reformation of the Buddhist sangha. They were King Mongkut (r. 1851–68), and his son King Chulalongkorn (r. 1868–1910), who were responsible for several key modern reforms of Thai Buddhism. Two recent Thai modernist movements are the monastic revival of the Thai forest tradition and the Wat Phra Dhammakāya movement.

From 1893, Vietnam, Cambodia and Laos were all French colonies. The Communists came to power in Laos in 1975. There was no widespread repression of the Buddhist sangha, but the communist government has sought to control the Sangha and use it as a tool to spread its ideology. In Cambodia however, the communist terror of the Khmer Rouge during 1975–1979 caused much damage to the Buddhist sangha.

=== East Asia ===
The opening of Japan in 1853 by Admiral Perry and the Meiji Restoration of 1868 led to the end of feudal Japan and rapid modernization. A new form of State Shinto arose as a strong competitor to Buddhism when it was adopted by the Japanese government. In 1872, the Japanese government decreed that Buddhist clerics could marry. These changes led to modernization efforts by Japanese Buddhism which saw the setting up of publishing houses and the study of Western philosophy and scholarship. In the post-war period, Japanese new religions arose, many of them influenced by Buddhism.

Chinese Buddhism meanwhile, suffered much destruction during the Christian-inspired Taiping Rebellion (1850–64), but saw a modest revival during the Republican period (1912–49). A key figure was Taixu (T'ai-hsü, 1899–1947), who is associated with the modernist Humanistic Buddhism trend of Chinese Buddhism. The Communist Cultural Revolution (1966–76) led to the closing of all Buddhist monasteries and widespread destruction of Buddhist institutions. However, since 1977, there has been a general shift in the policy of the communist government, and Buddhist activity, both monastic and lay, has once again been renewed.

Korean Buddhism suffered a series of setbacks during the Japanese invasions, occupation, and also during the Korean war. North Korea's harsh government nevertheless offers some limited support to the sangha, but it closely controls all activity. In South Korea, Buddhism underwent a revival, with youth groups being influential and temples being rebuilt with government aid. An example of a recent modern form of Korean Buddhism is Won Buddhism.

=== Central Asia ===
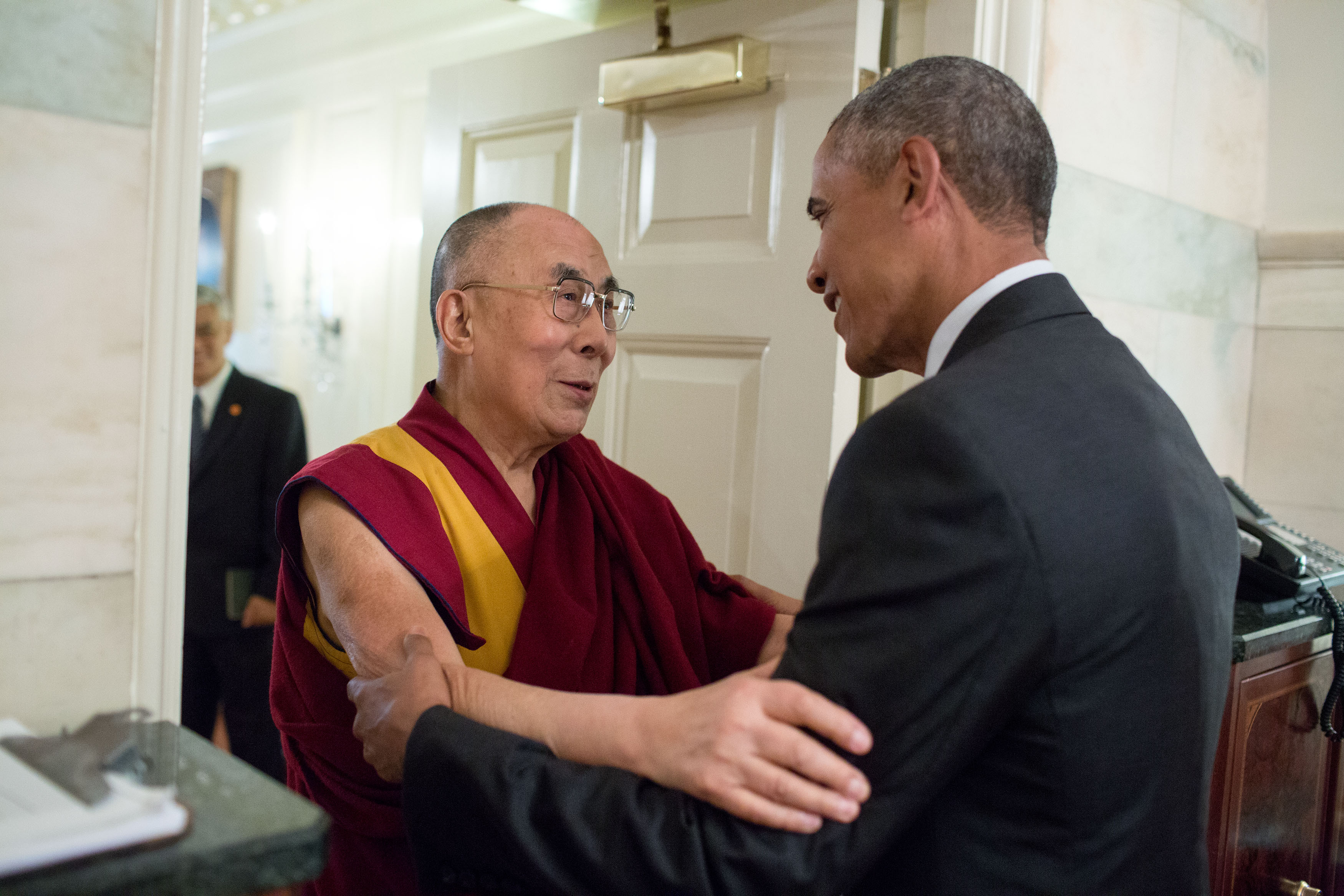
The Dalai Lama meeting with U.S. President Barack Obama in 2016.

Tibet (which had been a client state of the Qing dynasty) remained a traditional theocratic state (the Ganden Phodrang polity) with the Dalai Lamas as heads of state, from 1912 until the Chinese communist invasion in 1950. The 14th Dalai Lama fled the country in 1959. A Tibetan exile community was established in India, with its center at Dharamsala, which today contains various Buddhist monasteries and is a center for the study of Tibetan Buddhism. The 14th Dalai Lama has become one of the most popular Buddhist leaders in the world today.

During the Red Guard period (1966–67), Chinese communists destroyed around 6,000 monasteries in Tibet along with their art and books, an attempt to wipe out the Tibetan Buddhist culture. After 1980, Chinese repression of Tibetan Buddhism has decreased and the situation has improved with the reprinting of the Tibetan Canon and some artistic restoration. In the nearby countries of Bhutan, and Nepal, Vajrayana Buddhism continues to flourish as a major religion.

In Mongolia, which also has Tibetan Buddhism as its main religion, communist rule (between 1924 and 1990) saw much repression of Buddhism. However, Buddhism is now undergoing a revival in post-communist Mongolia, with more ordained monks and nuns, and with 284 monasteries since 2009. More recent liberal attitudes towards religion has also benefited the Buddhists of Tuva and Buryatia, as well as the Chinese region of Inner Mongolia.

Another modern development was the founding of the Kalmyk Khanate in the 17th century with Tibetan Buddhism as its main religion. During the course of the 18th century, they were absorbed by the Russian Empire as Kalmykia, which remains a federal subject of Russia with a majority Buddhist religion.

=== Western world ===
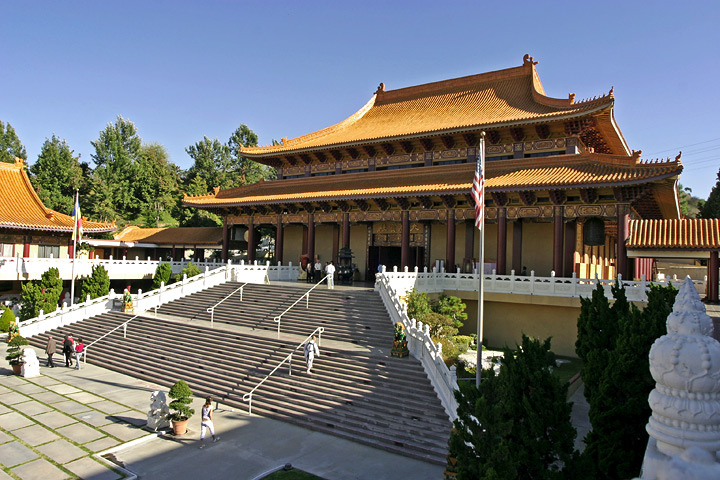
Main Hall of Hsi Lai, a Chinese-American temple in Los Angeles County, California. Completed in 1988, it is one of the largest Buddhist temples in the Western Hemisphere.

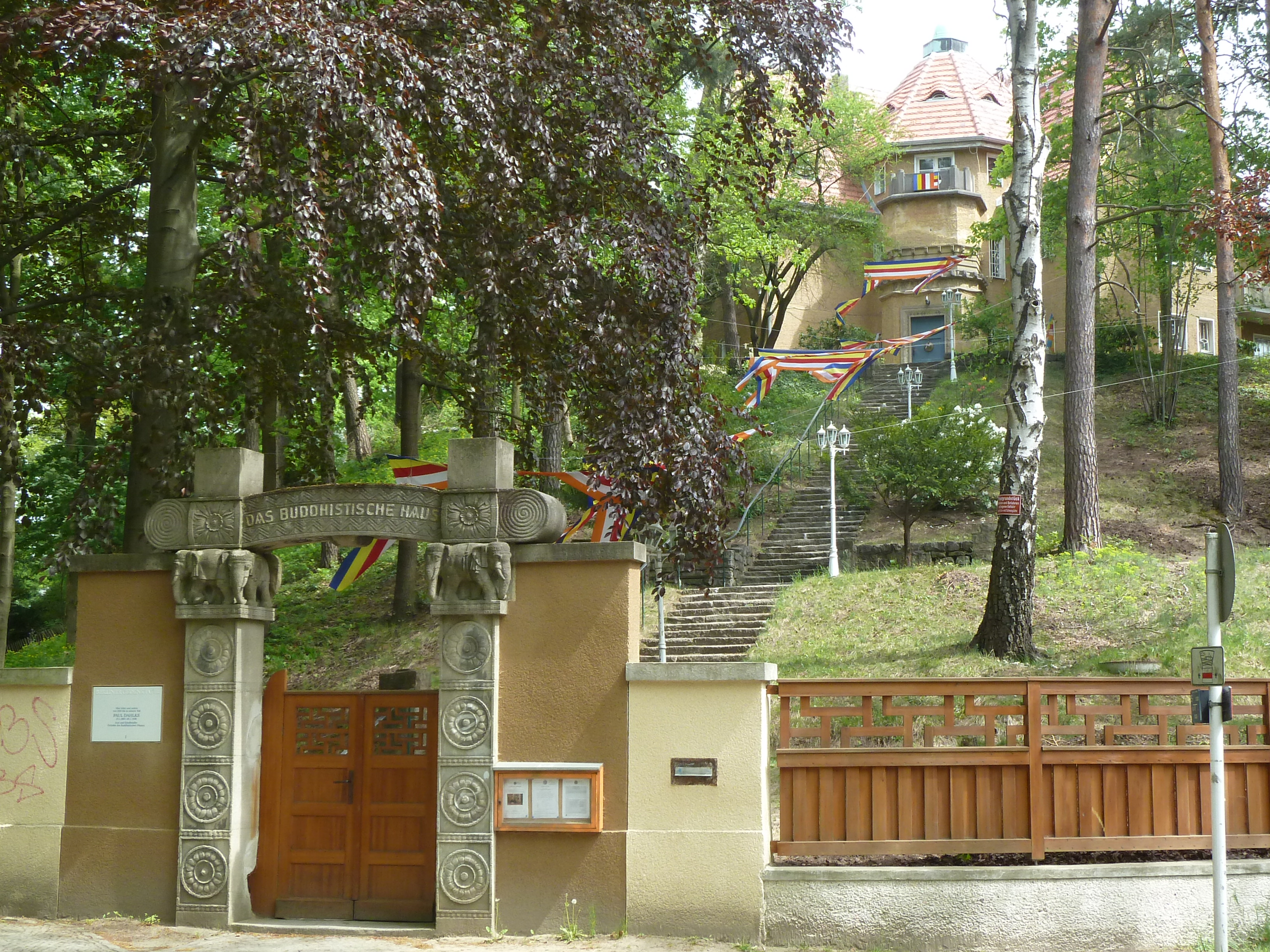
Das Buddhistische Haus, a Theravada Buddhist vihara in Berlin, Germany. It is considered the oldest Theravada Buddhist center in Europe.

During the 19th century, Western intellectuals became more aware of Buddhism through various contacts such as colonial servants, administrators, and Christian missionaries. Sir Edwin Arnold's book-length poem The Light of Asia (1879), a life of the Buddha, was a successful early publication on Buddhism that led to much interest among English speaking middle classes. The work of western Buddhist scholars like Hermann Oldenberg (1854–1920), T. W. Rhys Davids (1843–1922) and F. Max Müller was also influential in introducing Buddhism to western audiences.

The late 19th century also saw the first-known modern western conversions to Buddhism, including leading Theosophists Henry Steel Olcott and Helena Blavatsky in 1880 in Sri Lanka. The Theosophical Society was very influential in popularizing Indian religions in the west. The 19th century also saw the first western monastics such as U Dhammaloka, Ananda Metteyya and the German Nyānatiloka Thera (1878–1956).

Another important element leading to the growth of Buddhism in the west was the large scale immigration of Chinese and Japanese to the United States and Canada in the late 19th century. Refugees from Vietnam, Laos and Cambodia have also immigrated to west, beginning in 1975. Asian Buddhists such as DT Suzuki, Hsüan Hua, Hakuun Yasutani and Thích Nhất Hạnh were influential in teaching Zen Buddhism in the West in the 20th century. Shunryu Suzuki opened the Soto San Francisco Zen Center (1961) and the Tassajara Monastery (1967).

The Tibetan diaspora has also been active in promoting Tibetan Buddhism in the West. All of the four major Tibetan Buddhist schools have a presence in the West and have attracted Western converts. The number of its adherents is estimated to be between ten and twenty million.

The Theravada tradition has established various temples in the West, especially among immigrant communities in the US. Theravada vipassana meditation was also established in the West, through the founding of institutions like the Insight Meditation Society in 1975 and the vipassana centers of S. N. Goenka. The Thai forest tradition has also established communities in the US and in the UK. In the UK, the Triratna Buddhist Community arose as a new modern Buddhist movement.

In Continental Europe, interest in Buddhism also increased during the late 20th century, with an exponential increase in Buddhist groups in countries like Germany. In France and Spain, Tibetan Buddhism has the largest following. Tibetan, East Asian and Theravada traditions are now also present and active in Australia and New Zealand. Tibetan and Zen Buddhism also have established a small presence in Argentina, Brazil, Chile, Colombia and Venezuela.

== See also ==
- Timeline of Buddhism
- Greater India
- History of India
- Indian religions
- Indosphere
- Index of Buddhism-related articles
- Religion in India
- Ordination of women in Buddhism
- Secular Buddhism
- Silk Road transmission of Buddhism
- List of Buddhist kingdoms and Empires

== Sources ==
- Beal, Samuel (1884). Si-Yu-Ki: Buddhist Records of the Western World, by Hiuen Tsiang. 2 vols. Translated by Samuel Beal. London. 1884. Reprint: Delhi. Oriental Books Reprint Corporation. 1969. Volume 1 Volume2
- Behrendt, Kurt A. (2004). The Buddhist architecture of Gandhara, Handbuch der Orientalistik. Brill.
- Bentley, Jerry (1993). Old World Encounters: Cross-Cultural Contacts and Exchanges in Pre-Modern Times. New York: Oxford University Press.
- Boardman, John, The Diffusion of Classical Art in Antiquity, Princeton University Press, 1994, ISBN 0-691-03680-2
- Conze, Edward (1993). A Short History of Buddhism (2nd ed.). Oneworld. ISBN 978-1-85168-066-5.
- Cowell, E.B. (transl.) Ashvaghosa (author) (1894), The Buddha Carita or the Life of the Buddha, reprint, New Delhi, 1977.
- Cox, Collett (1995), Disputed Dharmas: Early Buddhist Theories on Existence, Tokyo: The Institute for Buddhist Studies, ISBN 4-906267-36-X
- Coningham, Robin; Young, Ruth (2015), The Archaeology of South Asia: From the Indus to Asoka, c.6500 BCE – 200 CE, Cambridge University Press, pp. 451–466, ISBN 978-1-316-41898-7 p. 453.
- Eliot, Charles, Japanese Buddhism, Routledge 1964. ISBN 0-7103-0967-8
- Eliot, Charles, Hinduism and Buddhism: An Historical Sketch (vol. 1–3), Routledge, London 1921, ISBN 81-215-1093-7 Internet Archive
- Errington, Elizabeth (1992). The Crossroads of Asia. Transformation in Image and symbol in the art of ancient Afghanistan and Pakistan. Ancient India and Iran Trust. ISBN 0-9518399-1-8.
- Foltz, Richard (2010). Religions of the Silk Road: Premodern Patterns of Globalization. New York: Palgrave Macmillan. ISBN 978-0-230-62125-1.
- Harvey, Peter (2012). An Introduction to Buddhism, Teachings, History and Practices (3rd ed.). Cambridge University Press.
- Keown, Damien, Dictionary of Buddhism, Oxford University Press, 2003, ISBN 0-19-860560-9
- Hermann Kulke; Dietmar Rothermund (2004). A History of India (4th ed.). London: Routledge. ISBN 0-415-15481-2.
- Linssen, Robert, Living Zen, Grove Press, New York, 1958. ISBN 0-8021-3136-0
- McRae, John (2003). Seeing Through Zen. The University Press Group.
- McEvilley, Thomas, The Shape of Ancient Thought. Comparative studies in Greek and Indian Philosophies, Allworth Press, New York, 2002. ISBN 1-58115-203-5
- "National Museum Arts asiatiques- Guimet" (Editions de la Reunion des Musées Nationaux, Paris, 2001) ISBN 2-7118-3897-8.
- Prebish, Charles S., ed. (1975). Buddhism: A Modern Perspective. Pennsylvania State University. ISBN 0-271-01185-8.
- Salomon, Richard (1999). Ancient Buddhist Scrolls from Gandhāra: The British Library Kharosthī Fragments. Gandharan Buddhist Texts. Seattle: University of Washington Press; London: The British Library. ISBN 978-0-29597769-0. Archived from the original on 2013-09-27.
- Sanderson, Alexis (2009). "The Śaiva Age: The Rise and Dominance of Śaivism during the Early Medieval Period". In Einoo, Shingo (ed.). Genesis and Development of Tantrism. Institute of Oriental Culture Special Series. Vol. 23. Tokyo: Institute of Oriental Culture, University of Tokyo.
- Skilton, Andrew (2004). A Concise History of Buddhism. Windhorse Publications. ISBN 978-0904766929.
- Snellgrove, David L. (2003). Indo-Tibetan Buddhism. Boston: Shambhala.
- Snellgrove, David L. (2004). Indo-Tibetan Buddhism: Indian Buddhists and Their Tibetan Successors.
- The Times Atlas of Archeology, Times Books Limited, London, 1991. ISBN 0-7230-0306-8
- Takakusu, J., I-Tsing, A Record of the Buddhist Religion : As Practised in India and the Malay Archipelago (A.D. 671–695), Clarendon press 1896. Reprint. New Delhi, AES, 2005, lxiv, 240 p., ISBN 81-206-1622-7.
- Tissot, Francine (1970). Gandhara. Paris: Librairie d'Amérique et d'Orient. ISBN 2-7200-1031-6.
- Warder, A.K. (2000). Indian Buddhism.
- Willemen, Charles, trans. (2009), Buddhacarita: In Praise of Buddha's Acts, Berkeley, Numata Center for Buddhist Translation and Research. ISBN 978-1-886439-42-9
