= Abhidharmakośa-bhāsya =

Text by Buddhist scholar Vasubandhu

Translations of Abhidharmakośa
- English: Treasury of Abhidharma
- Sanskrit: अभिधर्मकोश (IAST: Abhidharmakośa)
- Bengali: অভিধর্ম্মকোষভাষ্য
- Chinese: 阿毗達磨俱舍論 阿毗达磨俱舍论
- Japanese: 阿毘達磨倶舎論 (Rōmaji: Abidatsuma-kusharon)
- Korean: 아비달마구사론 (RR: Abidalma-Gusaron)
- Tibetan: ཆོས་མངོན་པའི་མཛོད་་ (chos mngon pa'i mdzod)
- Vietnamese: A-tì-đạt-ma-câu-xá luận Câu-xá luận Thông minh luận

The Abhidharmakośabhāṣya (Sanskrit: अभिधर्मकोशभाष्य, lit. Commentary on the Treasury of Abhidharma), Abhidharmakośa (Sanskrit: अभिधर्मकोश) for short (or just Kośa or AKB), is a key text on the Abhidharma written in Sanskrit by the Indian Buddhist scholar Vasubandhu in the 4th or 5th century CE. The Kośa summarizes the Sarvāstivādin Abhidharma in eight chapters with a total of around 600 verses and then comments on (and often criticizes) it. This text was widely respected and used by schools of Buddhism in India, Tibet and East Asia. Over time, the Abhidharmakośa became the main source of Abhidharma and Sravakayana Buddhism for later Mahāyāna Buddhists.

In the Kośa, Vasubandhu presents various views on the Abhidharma, mainly those of the Sarvāstivāda-Vaibhāṣika, which he often criticizes from a Sautrāntika perspective. The Kośa includes an additional chapter in prose refuting the idea of the "person" (pudgala) favoured by some Buddhists of the Pudgalavada school.

The Vaibhāṣika master Samghabhadra considered that Vasubandhu had misrepresented numerous key points of Vaibhāṣika Abhidharma in the Kośa, and saw Vasubandhu as a Sautrāntika (upholder of the sutras). However, Vasubandhu often presents and defends the Vaibhāṣika Abhidharma position on certain topics (contra Sautrāntika). Because of this, Chinese commentators like Pu Guang do not see Vasubandhu as either a Vaibhāṣika nor as a Sautrāntika.

== Background ==
The Abhidharmakośabhāṣya (AKB) is a work of Abhidharma, a field of Buddhist philosophy which mainly draws on the Sarvāstivāda Abhidharma tradition. This tradition includes various groupings or "schools", the two main ones being Vaibhāṣika and Sautrāntika. The main source for the Vaibhāṣika tradition (which was based in Kaśmīra) is the Abhidharma Mahāvibhāṣa Śāstra. The other main tradition of Sarvāstivāda philosophy were those masters who were called "westerners" (Pāścāttya) or "outsiders" (Bāhyaka) and they were mainly based in Gandhara.

These masters (later known as Sautrāntikas) did not fully accept the Vaibhāṣika philosophy and compiled their own Abhidharma texts, such as the Abhidharma-hṛdaya by Dharmaśrī, which was the first Abhidharma text to provide a series of verses with prose commentary (this is the style that the Kośa follows). This work was very influential on subsequent Abhidharma texts (which imitated its style) and various commentaries were written on it. The Abhidharmakośabhāṣya's style and structure is based on these Sautrāntika Abhidharma works.

According to K.L. Dhammajoti, in the AKB, Vasubandhu often favors the opinion of the Sautrāntika school against the Sarvāstivāda Vaibhāṣikas (when there is a dispute). For example, he criticizes the doctrine of the existence of the three times (past, present, future), a central Sarvāstivāda doctrine. However, this is not always the case and he seems to have sometimes also favored certain Vaibhāṣika doctrines (contra Sautrāntika), including the reality of certain mental factors (caittas), the notion of the conjunction (saṃprayoga) of mind (citta) and mental factors and also the Sarvāstivāda doctrine of simultaneous causation (sahabhu-hetu) which was rejected by Sautrantika masters like Śrīlāta.

== Content Overview ==
The text is divided into the following chapters.

=== 1: The Exposition on the Elements (dhātu-nirdeśa) ===
The first chapter of the work outlines the various conditioned and unconditioned factors (dharmas) that constitute sentient existence. This chapter mainly goes over the five aggregates, the sense fields, and the "eighteen dhātus". It also analyses which of the elements are pure or impure.

=== 2: The Exposition on the Faculties (indriya-nirdeśa) ===
The second chapter examines three interconnected topics, starting with the twenty-two sense faculties (indriya), which govern specific aspects of sentient life. These include the six sense faculties, the male and female sex faculties, the faculty of life force, five feeling faculties (e.g., pleasure and equanimity), five spiritual faculties (e.g., faith and wisdom), and three pure faculties related to spiritual attainment. Vasubandhu also discusses the Vaibhāṣika list of seventy-five factors, categorized into matter (rūpa), mind (citta), mental factors (caitasika), conditioned factors dissociated from mind (cittaviprayuktasaṃskāras), and unconditioned factors (asaṃskṛta).

This chapter further explores the simultaneous arising of conditioned factors, focusing on the interaction between mind moments (citta) and their accompanying thought concomitants. This leads into a broader discussion of causality, where Vasubandhu identifies the various types of causes (hetu), results (phala), and conditions (pratyaya).

Finally, the chapter explains how conscious events (cittas) succeed one another in causal sequence.

=== 3: The Exposition on the World (loka-nirdeśa) ===
The third chapter addresses Buddhist cosmology, describing the threefold world where sentient beings reside: the realms of desire (kāma-dhātu), realm of form (rūpya-dhātu), and the formless realm (arūpya-dhātu). Vasubandhu also explains the intermediate state (antarabhava) between death and rebirth and elaborates on dependent origination (pratītya-samutpāda), which accounts for cyclic existence without an enduring self (atman). He also depicts the receptacle world (bhājana-loka), detailing its physical structure—Mount Sumeru, continents, and oceans—and its cosmogony, temporal cosmology of kalpas and dissolution.

=== 4: The Exposition on Karma (karma-nirdeśa) ===
Chapter four of the Kośa is devoted to a study of action i.e. karma. This chapter explores the metaphysics of action, focusing on its most basic form, particularly bodily action. Debates on this topic include the Pudgalavādin view that action is movement, the Sarvāstivāda claim that it is shape, and Vasubandhu's Sautrāntika position that it is intention (cetanā) directed toward the body. The chapter distinguishes between informative actions, observable by others, and non-informative actions, internal to the agent, with mental action playing a crucial role in karmic retribution (vipaka). It also includes the Buddhist classification of ten virtuous and non-virtuous paths of action (karmapatha), concluding with a discussion of the effects of actions, though deferring details of their processes to later sections.

=== 5: The Exposition on the Underlying Tendencies (anuśaya-nirdeśa) ===
This chapter centers on latent dispositions or proclivities (anuśaya), the dormant state of mental afflictions (kleśa). These are subconscious dispositions that remain inactive until specific causes and conditions trigger them into active defilements, termed “envelopments” (paryavasthāna). Their importance in the Buddhist path lies in their role in motivating karma, which sustains saṃsāric existence. Six primary proclivities are identified: attachment (rāga), hostility (pratigha), ignorance (avidyā), conceit (māna), doubt (vicikitsā), and afflicted views (dṛṣṭi).

A major debate covered in this chapter is that between the Sarvāstivāda and Sautrāntika positions on defilement. The Sarvāstivādins view the proclivities (anuśaya) as ultimately existent factors (dharmas) that transform into active defilements, treating "proclivity" and "envelopment" as synonymous. In contrast, Vasubandhu’s Sautrāntika perspective denies their ultimate existence, interpreting proclivities as forces (śākti) within the mind stream that lead to afflictions through transformation. Vasubandhu likens proclivities to seeds (bīja) that mature into fruits (phala). This discussion extends to the nature of past and future dharmas, with Sarvāstivāda asserting their existence and Sautrāntika rejecting unnecessary ontological entities.

=== 6: The Exposition on Paths and Persons (mārgapudgala-nirdeśa) ===
The sixth chapter describes the path to liberation, structured around the four noble truths and the schema of the five paths. Vasubandhu addresses concerns such as why the first truth emphasizes suffering and not pleasure. He also provides definitions of conventional and ultimate truths. Meditative practices, including mindfulness of breathing, the loathsomeness of the body, and the four foundations of mindfulness, are explained and categorized under the path of preparation (prayogamārga). The subsequent paths are the path of insight (darśanamārga), the path of cultivation (bhāvanāmārga), and the path of no further training (aśaikṣamārga), correlating with levels of defilement purification and the stages of attainment: stream-enterer, once-returner, non-returner, and arhat. Additionally, the thirty-seven factors conducive to awakening (bodhipakṣikadharma) are discussed in this chapter.

=== 7: The Exposition on Wisdom (jñāna-nirdeśa) ===
The seventh chapter outlines the ten types of knowledge (jñāna) attained by those at advanced spiritual levels. These include knowledge of factors (dharmajñāna), subsequent knowledge (anvayajñāna), mundane conventional knowledge (lokasaṃvṛtijñāna), knowledge of others’ minds (paracittajñāna), and knowledge of the four noble truths (suffering, its origin, cessation, and the path). Advanced forms include knowledge of exhaustion (kṣayajñāna) and non-arising (anutpādajñāna), unique to arhats, representing certainty in the completion of tasks related to the truths. The chapter differentiates these types of knowledge from right view (samyagdṛṣṭi) and receptivity (kṣānti), while also exploring their qualities and characteristics.

=== 8: The Exposition on Meditative Attainment (samāpatti-nirdeśa) ===
The eighth chapter delves into meditative attainments (samāpatti), offering a detailed analysis of absorptions (samādhi). It describes the qualities of the four meditations (dhyāna) of the form realm, the four formless perception spheres (āyatana), and the attainment of cessation (nirodhasamāpatti). Vasubandhu highlights three key types of samādhi: the samādhi of emptiness (śūnyatā), leading to the realization of selflessness; the samādhi of signlessness (animitta), focusing on the nirvana free of characteristics; and the samādhi of wishlessness (apraṇihita), fostering detachment from all phenomena. The chapter also explores the four immeasurables (brahmavihāra)—loving-kindness (maitrī), compassion (karuṇā), joy (muditā), and equanimity (upekṣā)—alongside three additional frameworks of concentration: the eight liberations (vimokṣa), the eight spheres of mastery (abhivāyatana), and the ten totality spheres (kṛtsnāyatana).

=== 9: The Refutation of the View of a Self (atmavāda-pratiṣedha) ===
This additional concluding treatise critiques notions of individuality, targeting two key perspectives. The first is the Pudgalavāda view, which posits the existence of a person (pudgala) distinct yet not separate from the five aggregates. Vasubandhu challenges this with arguments from reason and scripture, particularly addressing the school’s fire-and-fuel analogy. The second critique targets the concept of an enduring self (ātman), upheld in various forms by all six orthodox Indian schools. Vasubandhu addresses objections from putative Hindu philosophers, tackling issues such as the no-self doctrine's compatibility with memory, agency (e.g., walking), and the differentiation of individual consciousness streams.

== The Text and its Translations ==
The Sanskrit original of the Abhidharmakośabhāṣya was lost for centuries, and was known to scholarship only through Chinese and Tibetan translations. The work was of such importance to the history of Indian thought that in the 1930s, the great scholar Rāhula Sāṅkṛtyāyana (1893–1963) even re-translated the verses into Sanskrit, from Tibetan, and wrote his own Sanskrit commentary on them. However, during a subsequent visit to Tibet, Sāṅkṛtyāyana discovered an ancient palm-leaf manuscript of 367 leaves that contained not only Vasubandhu's verses, but his lost commentary. In 1967 and then in a revised edition of 1975, Prof. P. Pradhan of Utkal University finally published the original Sanskrit text of the Abhidharmakośabhāṣya, Vasubandhu's great work summarizing earlier traditions of the Vibhāṣā school of Buddhist philosophy.

The Abhidharmakośa-kārikā (the verses) and the Abhidharmakośa-bhāṣya (the auto-commentary) were translated into Chinese in the 6th century by Paramārtha (T1559). They were translated again in the 7th century by Xuanzang (T1560 & T1558). Other translations and commentaries exist in Tibetan, Chinese, Classical Mongolian and Old Uyghur.

The verses and the commentary were first translated into a European language by Louis de La Vallée-Poussin, published in 1923–1931 in French, which is primarily based on Xuanzang's Chinese translation but also references the Sanskrit text, Paramārtha's Chinese translation, and the Tibetan.

Currently, three complete English translations exist. The first by Leo M. Pruden in 1988 and the second by Gelong Lodrö Sangpo in 2012 are both based on La Vallée-Poussin's French translation. The third by Masahiro Shōgaito in 2014 is a translation of the Uighur translation of Xuanzang's Chinese translation.

- La Vallée-Poussin, Louis de (1923–1931). L'Abhidharmakośa de Vasubandhu. Brussels: Institut belge des hautes études chinoises.
- Pruden, Leo M. (1988–1990). Abhidharmakośabhāṣyam of Vasubandhu (4 volumes). Berkeley, California: Asian Humanities Press. ISBN 0-89581-913-9.
- Lodrö Sangpo, Gelong (2012). Abhidharmakośa-Bhāṣya of Vasubandhu: The Treasury of the Abhidharma and its (Auto) commentary (4 volumes). Delhi: Motilal Banarsidass Publishers. ISBN 978-8120836075.
- Shōgaito, Masahiro (2014). The Uighur Abhidharmakośabhāṣya: Preserved at the Museum of Ethnography in Stockholm. Wiesbaden, Germany: Harrassowitz Verlag. ISBN 978-3-447-10204-9.

== Commentaries ==
There are many commentaries written on this text.

=== Indian Commentaries ===
Indian Buddhist commentaries include:

- Samghabhadra (5th century CE), Abhidharmakośa-śāstra-kārikā-bhāṣya (Tibetan: chos mngon pa mdzod kyi bstan bcos kyi tshig le'ur byas pa'i rnam par bshad pa). This is a brief summary of the Abhidharmakośa.
- Samghabhadra (5th century CE), Nyāyānusāra. This text critiques Vasubandhu's exposition on numerous points and defends the Vaibhasika orthodox views against Vasubandhu and other Sautrāntikas such as the elder Śrīlāta and his pupil Rāma. It only survives in a Chinese translation by Xuanzang.
- Yashomitra (6th c. CE), Abhidharmakośa-ṭīkā or Abhidharmakośa-sphuṭārthā (chos mngon pa'i mdzod kyi 'grel bshad (don gsal ba)
- Sthiramati (6th c. CE), Abhidharmakoṣa-bhāṣya-ṭīkā-tattvārtha (chos mngon pa mdzod kyi bshad pa'i rgya cher 'grel pa, don gyi de kho na nyid)
- Dignaga (6th c. CE), Abhidharmakośa-vṛtti-marmapradīpa (chos mngon pa'i mdzod kyi 'grel pa gnad kyi sgron ma)
- Purnavardhana, Abhidharmakośa-ṭīkā-lakṣaṇānusāriṇī (chos mngon pa mdzod kyi 'grel bshad mtshan nyid kyi rjes su 'brang ba). Purnavardhana was a student of Sthiramati.
- Purnavardhana, Abhidharmakośa-ṭīkā-lakṣaṇānusāriṇī (2nd commentary, but with same name as the first)
- Śamathadeva (date unknown), Abhidharmakośa-ṭīkopayikā (chos mngon pa'i mdzod kyi 'grel bshad nye bar mkho ba, Derge no. 4094 / Peking no. 5595), a handbook of the Kośa that quotes passages from the Mūlasarvāstivāda Tripitaka.
- Unknown author, Sārasamuccaya-nāma-abhidharmāvatāra-ṭīkā (chos mngon pa la 'jug pa rgya cher 'grel pa snying po kun las btus)

=== Chinese Commentaries ===
According to Paul Demiéville, some of the major extant Chinese commentaries to the Abhidharmakośa include:

- Shentai (神泰), Jushe lun shu (俱舍論疏), originally in twenty Chinese volumes, today only volumes 1, 2, 4, 5, 6, 7 and 17 are extant.
- Puguang (普光), Jushe lun ji (俱舍論記, in thirty-volumes, 7th century), which quotes Shentai. Puguang also wrote a small treatise on the Kosa.
- Fabao (法寶), Jushe lun shu (俱舍論疏), which quotes Shentai and Puguang.
- Yuanhui (圓暉), Jushe lun song shu (俱舍論頌疏). According to Demiéville, this work was "commented upon several times in China and widely used in Japan; it is from this work that the Mahayanists generally draw their knowledge of the Kośa. But from the point of view of Indology, it does not offer the same interest as the three preceding commentaries."

Two other disciples of Xuanzang, Huaisi and Kuiji, wrote commentaries on the Kośa which are lost.

=== Tibetan Commentaries ===
- Chim Lozang Drakpa (1299-1375), An Ocean of Excellent Explanations Clarifying the Abhidharma Kośa (chos mngon pa gsal byed legs par bshad pa'i rgya mtsho)
- Chim Jampé Yang (13th century), Ornament of Abhidharma (mngon pa'i rgyan), Chim Jampé Yang was a student of Chim Lozang Drakpa.
- Rongtön Sheja Kunrig (1367-1449), Thoroughly Illuminating What Can be Known (shes bya rab gsal). Rongtön was a great scholar of the Sakya school.
- Gendün Drup, First Dalai Lama (1391–1474) Illuminating the Path to Liberation (thar lam gsal byed)
- The Ninth Karmapa Wangchuk Dorje (1556–1603), An Explanation of the Treasury of Abhidharma called the Essence of the Ocean of Abhidharma, The Words of Those who Know and Love, Explaining Youthful Play, Opening the Eyes of Dharma, the Chariot of Easy Practice (chos mngon pa mdzod kyi rnam par bshad pa chos mngon rgya mtsho’i snying po mkhyen brtse’i zhal lung gzhon nu rnam rol legs bshad chos mig rnam ’byed grub bde’i shing rta)
- Mipham Rinpoche (1846–1912), (rin po che'i do shal blo gsal dgyes pa'i mgul rgyan)
- Jamyang Loter Wangpo (1847-1914), A Lamp Illuminating Vasubandhu's Intention (dbyig gnyen dgongs pa gsal ba'i sgron me)
- Khenpo Shenga (1871–1927), A Mirror for What Can be Known (shes bya'i me long)

== See also ==
- Abhidharma
- Dharma
- Sarvastivada
- Mulasarvastivada
- Kleshas (Buddhism)
- Mental factors (Buddhism)

== Sources ==
=== Printed sources ===
- Lamotte, Etienne (2001), Karmasiddhi Prakarana: The Treatise on Action by Vasubandhu, English translation by Leo M. Pruden, Asian Humanities Press
- Ronkin, Noa (2005), Early Buddhist Metaphysics: the Making of a Philosophical Tradition, Routledge, ISBN 0-203-53706-8
- Vallée Poussin, Louis de la, trad. (1923-1931). L’Abhidharmakosa de Vasubandhu, Paris: Paul Geuthner, Vol. 1, Vol. 2, Vol. 3, Vol. 4, Vol. 5, Vol. 6.
- Pruden, Leo M. (1991), Abhidharmakosabhasyam, translated from the French translation by Louis de la Vallée Poussin, Asian Humanities Press, Berkeley.
- Vasubandhu; Lodrö Sangpo; La Vallée Poussin, Louis de (2012). Abhidharmakośa-Bhāṣya of Vasubandhu : the treasury of the Abhidharma and its (Auto) commentary. Delhi, India. ISBN 978-81-208-3607-5. OCLC 814523082.
