= Sarvastivada =

Early school of Buddhism, circa 3rd century BCE

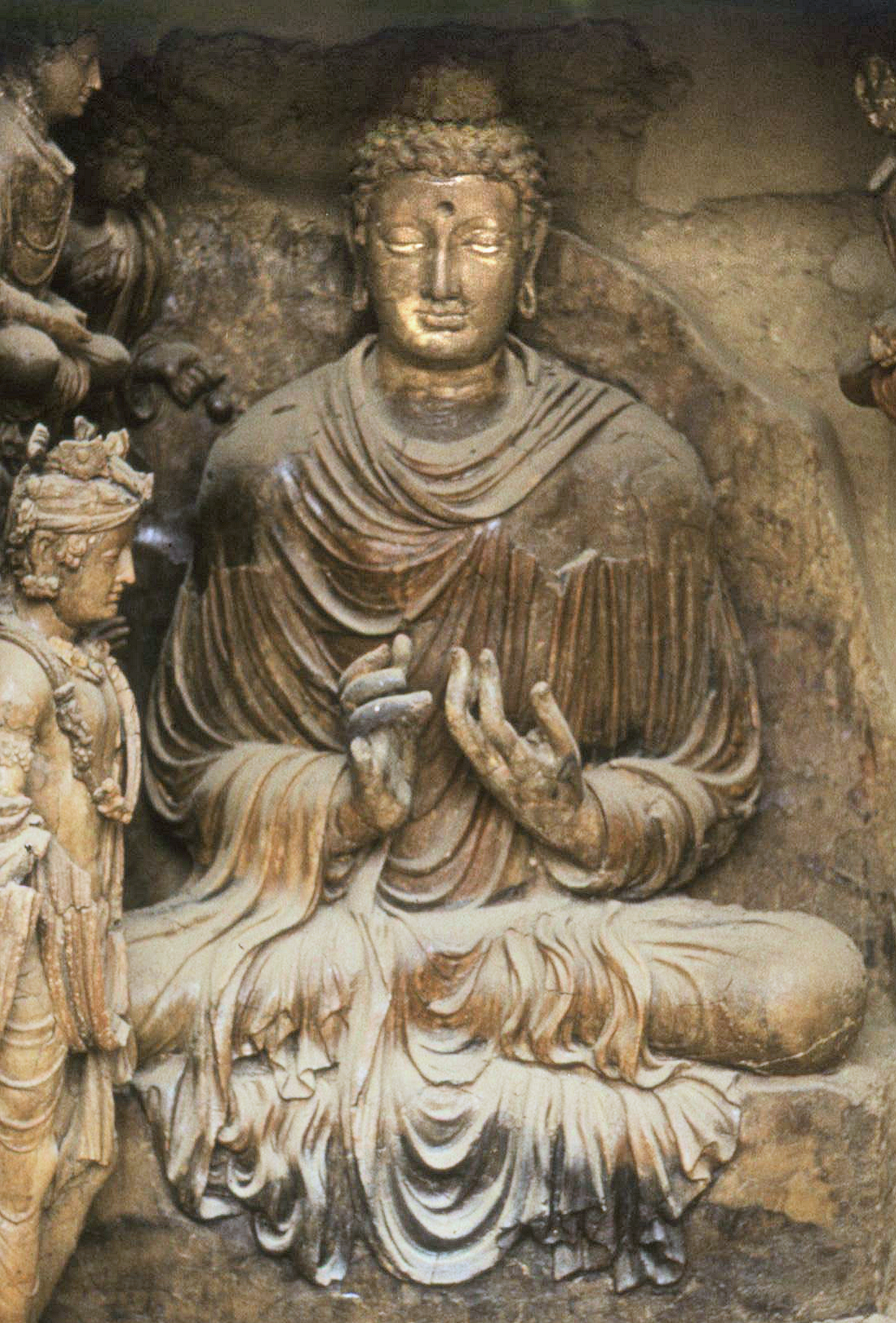
Seated Buddha from the Sarvāstivādin monastery of Tapa Shotor, 2nd century CE

The Sarvāstivāda (Sanskrit: 𑀲𑀭𑁆𑀯𑀸𑀲𑁆𑀢𑀺𑀯𑀸𑀤 (Note: Pali: 𑀲𑀩𑁆𑀩𑀢𑁆𑀣𑀺𑀯𑀸𑀤, romanized: Sabbatthivāda Chinese: 說一切有部; pinyin: Shuōyīqièyǒu Bù; Japanese: せついっさいうぶ; Korean: 설일체유부; Vietnamese: Nhất thiết hữu bộ; Thai: สรวาสติวาท; Sinhala: සර්වාස්තිවාද)) was one of the early Buddhist schools established around the reign of Ashoka (third century BCE). It was particularly known as an Abhidharma tradition, with a unique set of seven canonical Abhidharma texts.

Sarvāstivāda is a Sanskrit term that can be glossed as: "the theory of all that exists". The Sarvāstivāda argued that all dharmas (phenomena) exist in the past, present and future, the "three times". Vasubandhu's Abhidharmakośa-bhāsya states that "He who affirms the existence of the dharmas of the three time periods [past, present and future] is held to be a Sarvāstivādin."

The Sarvāstivādins were one of the most influential Buddhist monastic groups, flourishing throughout North India, especially Kashmir and Central Asia, until the 7th century CE. The orthodox Kashmiri branch of the school composed the large and encyclopedic Abhidharma Mahāvibhāṣa Śāstra around the time of the reign of Kanishka (c. 127–150 CE). Because of this, orthodox Sarvāstivādins who upheld the doctrines in the Mahāvibhāṣa were called Vaibhāṣikas.

== Name ==
Sarvāstivāda is a Sanskrit term that can be glossed as: "the theory of all that exists". The Sarvāstivāda argued that all dharmas (phenomena) exist in the past, present and future, the "three times". Vasubandhu's Abhidharmakośa-bhāsya states that "He who affirms the existence of the dharmas of the three time periods [past, present and future] is held to be a Sarvāstivādin."

Although there is some dispute over how the word "Sarvāstivāda" is to be analyzed, the general consensus is that it is to be parsed into three parts: sarva-, "all" or "every"; -asti-, "exist"; and -vāda, "speak", "say", or "theory". This agrees neatly with the Chinese term for the school—Shuōyīqièyǒu bù (Chinese: 說一切有部), literally "the sect that speaks of the existence of everything"—as used by Xuanzang and other translators.

The Sarvāstivāda path was also known by other names, such as—particularly in the Sarvāstivāda-Vaibhāṣika branch—Hetuvāda and Yuktivāda. The former comes from the root hetu-, "cause", which indicates their emphasis on causation and conditionality; the latter, from yukti-, meaning "reason" or "logic", which may derive from their predilection for the use of rational argument and syllogism.

== Origination and history ==
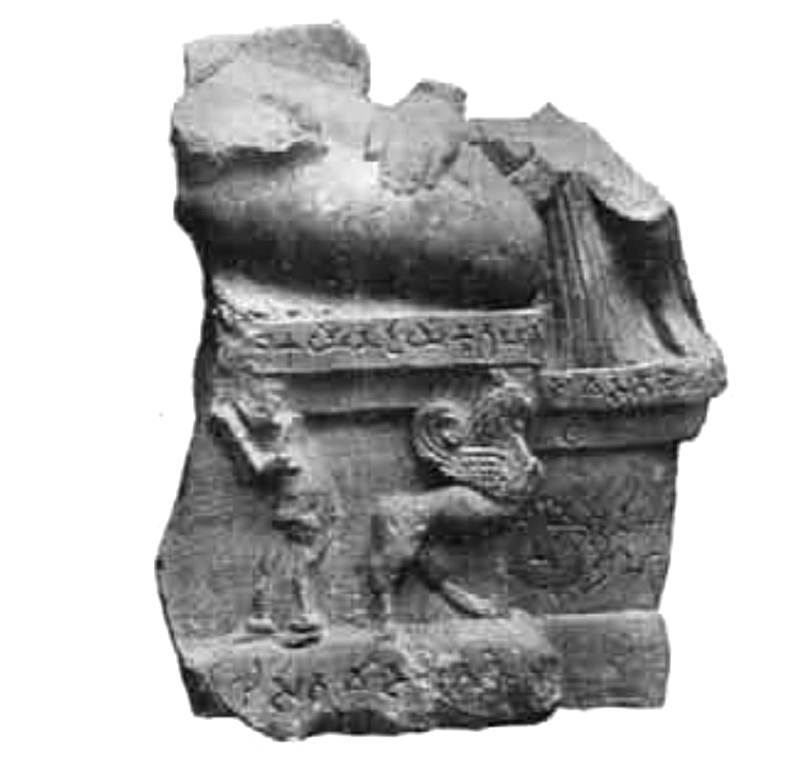
Fragment of a Buddha stele in the name of a "Kshatrapa lady" named Naṃda ( Naṃdaye Kshatrapa), from the Art of Mathura. The stele is dedicated to the Bodhisattva "for the welfare and happiness of all sentient beings for the acceptance of the Sarvastivādas". Northern Satraps period, 1st century CE.

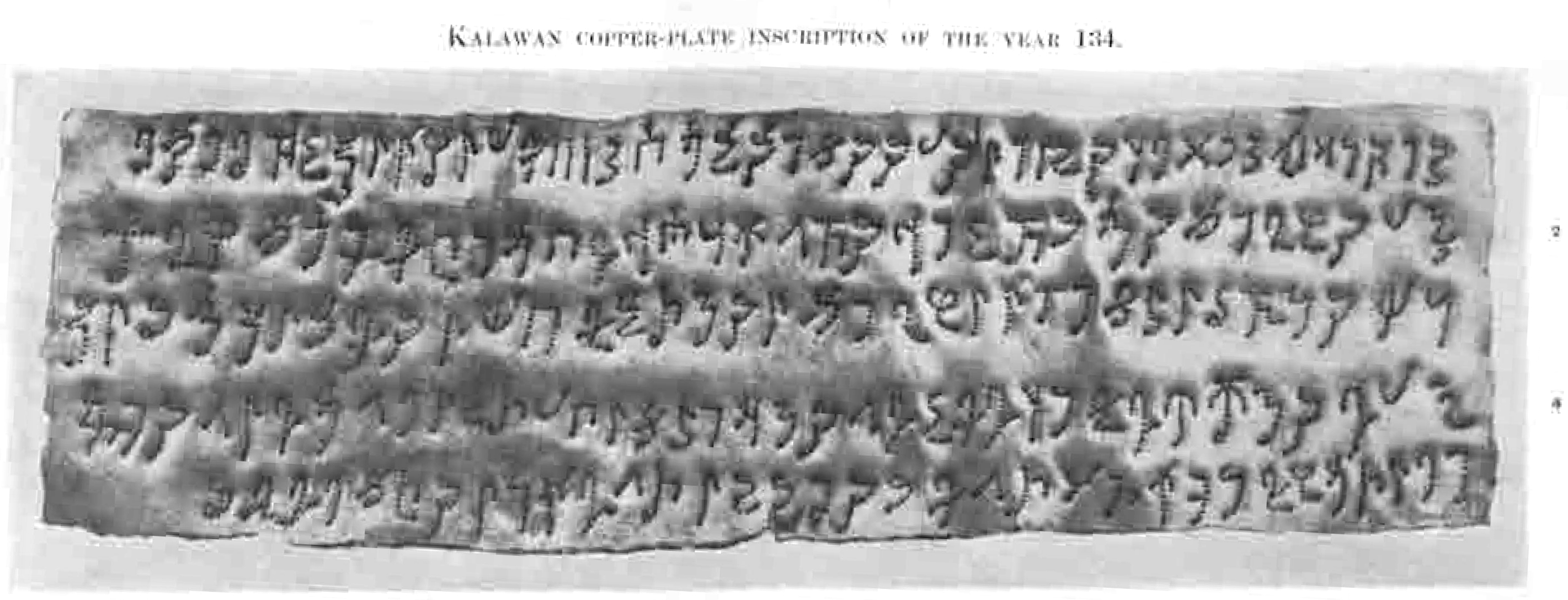
Copper-plate inscription mentioning the Sarvastivādas, in the year 134 of the Azes era, i.e. 84 CE, Kalawan, Taxila.

=== Early history ===
According to Charles Prebish, "there is a great deal of mystery surrounding the rise and early development of the Sarvāstivādin school." According to K. L. Dhammajoti, "its presence, as well as that of its rival—the Vibhajyavāda lineage—in the time of Emperor Aśoka is beyond doubt. Since Aśoka's reign is around 268–232 BCE, this means that at least by the middle of the 3rd century BCE, it had already developed into a distinct school."

According to some accounts, the Sarvāstivādins emerged from the Sthavira Nikāya, a small group of conservatives, who split from the reformist majority Mahāsāṃghikas at the Second Buddhist Council. According to this account, they were expelled from Magadha, and moved to Northwest India where they developed into the Sarvāstivādin school.

There have been debates about the exact chronology of the Sarvastivādin emergence from the Sthavira Nikāya. According to the Theravādin Dīpavaṃsa, the Sarvāstivādins coalesced out of the older Mahīśāsaka school, but the Śāriputraparipṛcchā and the Samayabhedoparacanaćakra state the opposite (i.e., that the Mahīśāsaka emerged from the Sarvāstivāda, rather).

Theravāda Buddhists have, at times, tendered accusations that the Sarvāstivādins were heavily influenced by the non-Buddhist Sāṅkhya school of philosophy. The important Buddhist philosopher Aśvaghoṣa, who may have been associated with Sarvāstivāda, states—in his influential Buddhacaritam—that Āḷāra Kālāma, the first of the young Buddha's teachers, followed an archaic form of Sāṅkhya.

The Sarvāstivādins are believed to have given rise to the Mūlasarvāstivāda and Sautrāntika schools, although the relationship between these groups has not yet been fully determined. It has been suggested that some yogic Sarvāstivādins, under early Mahāyāna influence, gave rise to Yogācāra, one of the most important and influential traditions of Mahāyāna Buddhism.

In Central Asia, several Buddhist monastic groups were historically prevalent. A number of scholars have identified three distinct major phases of missionary activity in the history of Buddhism in Central Asia, which are associated with—respectively—the Dharmaguptaka, the Sarvāstivāda, and the Mūlasarvāstivāda; and the origins of the Sarvāstivāda have also been related to Ashoka's sending of Majjhantika (Sanskrit Madhyāntika) on a mission to Gandhara, which had an early Sarvāstivādin presence. The Sarvāstivādins, in turn, are believed to have given rise to the Mūlasarvāstivāda sect, although the relationship between these two groups has not yet been fully determined. According to Prebish, "this episode corresponds well with one Sarvāstivādin tradition stating that Madhyantika converted the city of Kasmir, which seems to have close ties with Gandhara."

A third tradition says that a community of Sarvāstivādin monks was established at Mathura by the patriarch Upagupta. In the Sarvāstivādin tradition, Upagupta is said to have been the fifth patriarch after Mahākaśyapa, Ānanda, Madhyāntika, and Śāṇakavāsin; in the Ch'an tradition, he is regarded as the fourth.

=== Kushan era ===
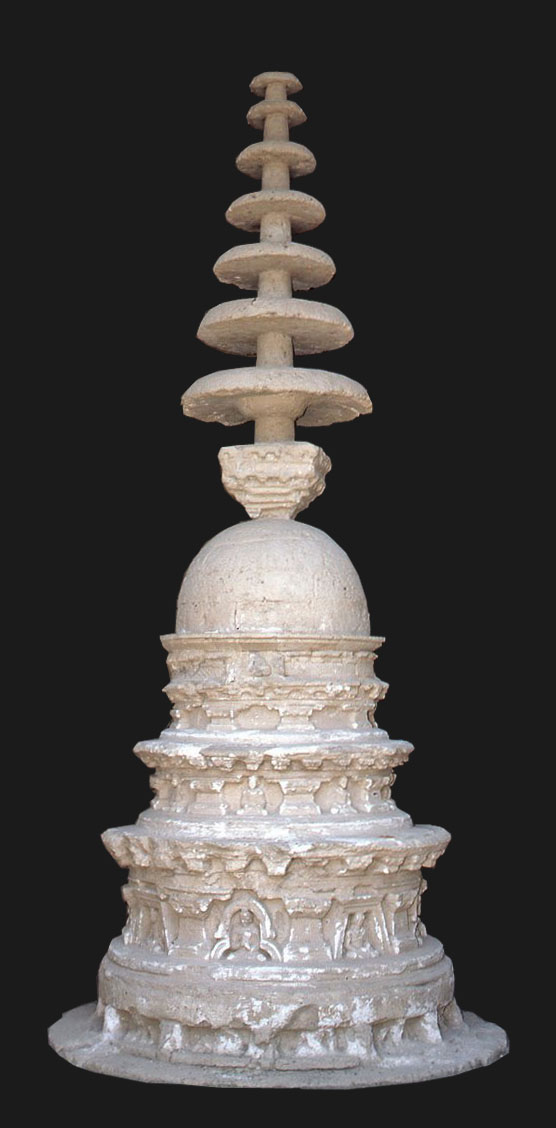
A Kushan era votive stupa from Mohra Muradu, Taxila, where Sarvāstivāda groups are known to have lived by the end of the first century BCE.

The Sarvāstivāda enjoyed the patronage of the emperor Kanishka (c. 127–150 CE) of the Kushan Empire, during which time they were greatly strengthened and became one of the dominant sects of Indian Buddhism for centuries; they flourished throughout Northwest India, North India, and Central Asia.

When the Sarvāstivāda school held a synod in Kashmir during the reign of Kanishka II (c. 158–176), the most important Sarvāstivāda Abhidharma text, the Astagrantha of Katyayaniputra, was rewritten and revised in Sanskrit. This revised text was now known as Jñānaprasthāna ("Course of Knowledge"). Though the Gandharan Astagrantha had many vibhaṣas (commentaries), the new Kashmiri Jñānaprasthāna had a Sanskrit Mahāvibhaṣa ("great commentary"), compiled by the Kashmir Sarvāstivāda synod. The Jñānaprasthāna, and its Mahāvibhaṣa, were then declared to be the new orthodoxy by the Kashmiri Sarvāstivādins, who called themselves Vaibhāṣikas.

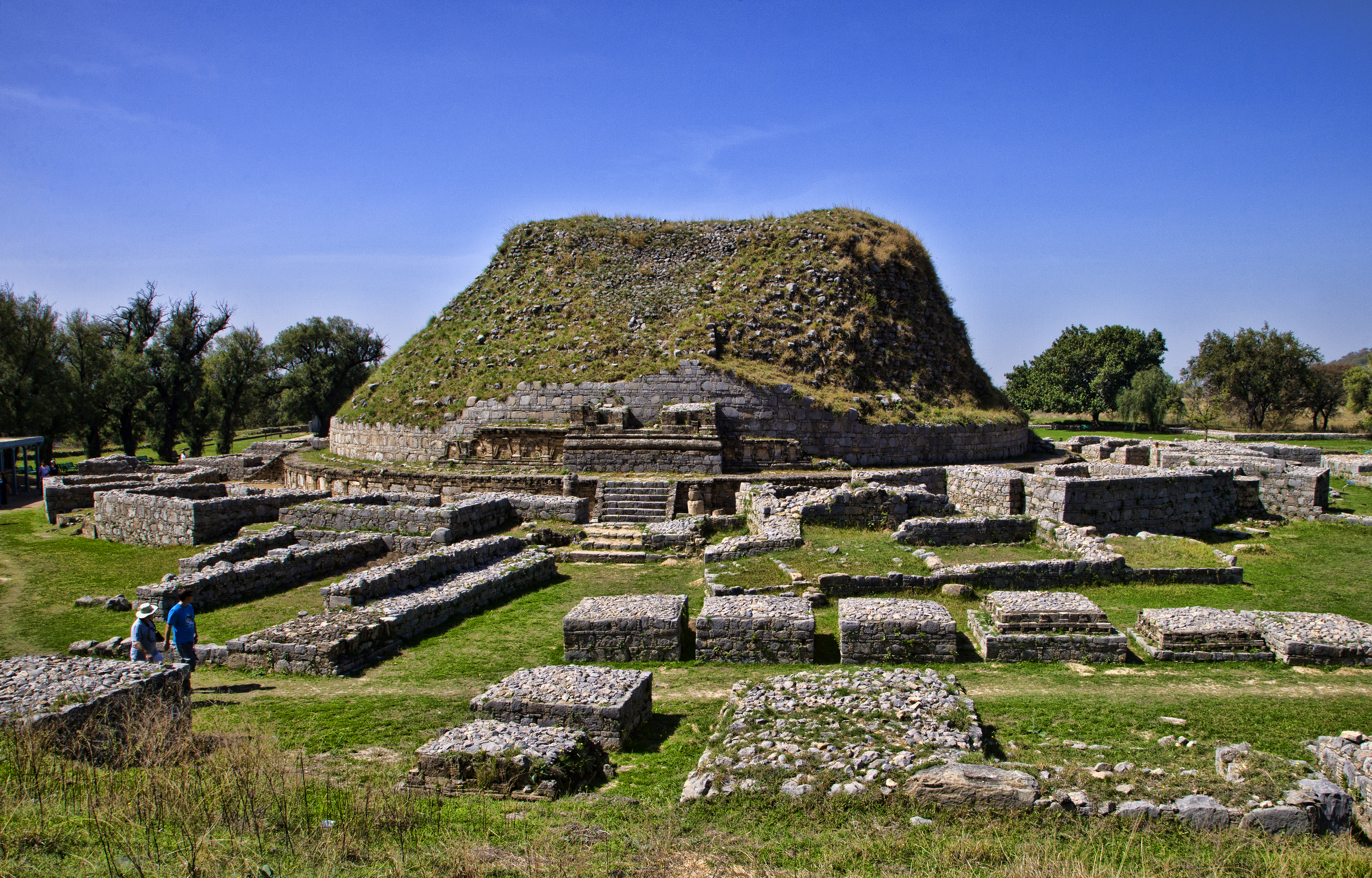
The Dharmarajika Stupa and monastery ruins, a major Buddhist site in Taxila, one of the capitals of the Kushan Empire

This new Vaibhāṣika orthodoxy, however, was not readily accepted by all Sarvāstivādins: some "Western masters", from Gandhara and Bactria, held to views which diverged from the new Kashmiri orthodoxy. These disagreements can be seen in post-Mahāvibhaṣa works, such as the *Tattvasiddhi Śāstra (成實論); the *Abhidharmahṛdaya (T. no. 1550) and its commentaries (T. no. 1551, no. 1552); the Abhidharmakośakārikā of Vasubandhu (who critiqued some orthodox views) and its commentaries; and the *Nyāyānusāra (順正理論) of master Saṃghabhadra (c. fifth century CE), who formulated perhaps the most robust Vaibhāṣika response to the new criticisms.

=== Tarim Basin ===
When the Chinese pilgrim Xuanzang visited Kucha in the Tarim Basin in 630 CE, he received the favours of Suvarṇadeva, the son and successor of Suvarṇapuṣpa, the non-Mahāyāna Buddhist King of Kucha. Xuanzang described in many details the characteristics of Kucha, and probably visited the Kizil Caves. Of the religion of the people of Kucha, he says that they were Sarvastivādins:

There are about one hundred convents (saṅghārāmas) in this country, with five thousand and more disciples. These belong to the Little Vehicle of the school of the Sarvāstivādas (Shwo-yih-tsai-yu-po). Their doctrine (teaching of Sūtras) and their rules of discipline (principles of the Vinaya) are like those of India, and those who read them use the same (originals).

— Xuanzang, on the religion of Kucha.

== Doctrine ==
As their name suggests, a central doctrine of the Sarvāstivāda was that all dharmas (a term here meaning the elementary components of existence or experience) always exist; they neither come into being, nor pass away, but exist in the past and future as surely as in the present. This was justified with, among other arguments, reference to canonical texts: e.g., since the Buddha said that one's good or bad (intentional) actions will ripen to bear good or bad karmic fruit as appropriate, it follows that the dharmas involved must yet be extant at the moment of this fruition—even though the cause thereof (vipāka-hetu) can only be some action taken in the past.

Among the different Sarvāstivāda thinkers, there were different ideas as to how this "all dharmas exist" theory was to be understood; these were generally found acceptable by the Sarvāstivādin sangha at large, so long as they did not outright contradict the core doctrine. Many such ideas can be seen in the Mahāvibhāṣa Śāstra, which outlines the four different interpretations of this doctrine by the "four great Ābhidharmikas of the Sarvāstivāda": Dharmatrāta, Buddhadeva, Vasumitra, and Ghoṣaka.

The teachings of the Sarvāstivāda were, however, by no means confined to this sole doctrine (of "all exists"), but also included: the theories of momentariness (kṣaṇika), conjoining (saṃprayukta) and causal simultaneity (sahabhū), and conditionality (hetu and pratyaya); a unique presentation of the spiritual path (mārga); and others. These doctrines are all inter-connected; the "all exists" principle was given pride of place because it was seen as being the "axial" teaching, which held the larger movement together when the precise details of other doctrines were at issue.

== Sub-schools ==
The Sarvāstivāda were a widespread group; there were several different sub-schools or sects throughout its history, the most influential being the Vaibhāṣika and the Sautrāntika schools. According to Cox, Willemen and Dessein:

We have, basically, to differentiate the original Sarvāstivādins originating from Mathura, the Kaśmīri Vaibhāṣikas, the Western Masters of Gandhara and Bactria (the Dārṣṭāntika-Sautrāntika Masters) who were also referred to as Bahirdesaka, Aparāntaka and Pāścāttya, and the Mūlasarvāstivādins. As the various groups influenced one another, even these sub-schools do very often not form homogeneous groups.

=== Vaibhāṣika ===
The Sarvāstivāda-Vaibhāṣika school was formed by adherents of the Mahāvibhāṣa Śāstra (hereafter MVŚ) during the council of Kashmir—though, as noted by K. L. Dhammajoti, "It is important to realize that not all of them necessarily subscribed to each and every view sanctioned by the MVŚ compilers. Moreover, the evolving nature of the Vaibhāṣika views must be recognized as well." After its emergence, it comprised the orthodox or mainstream branch of the Sarvāstivāda in Kāśmīra, though it was not exclusive to this region.

The Vaibhāṣika—which had by far the most "comprehensive edifice of doctrinal systematics" of the early Buddhist schools—were widely influential in India and beyond. The Vaibhāṣika are sometimes referred to in the MVŚ as "the Ābhidharmikas", "the Sarvāstivāda theoreticians" and "the masters of Kāśmīra." In various texts, they also referred to their tradition as Yuktavāda (the "doctrine of logic"), as well as Hetuvāda (the "doctrine of causes").

The Vaibhāṣika school saw itself as the most orthodox Sarvāstivāda tradition, and its adherents were united in their defense of the core Sarvāstivādin principle of "all exists" (sarvām asti); that is, the doctrine that all dharmas—past, present, and future—exist, which has been described as an eternalist theory of time. While the Vaibhāṣikas held that the dharmas of the "three times" all had some form of existence, they taught also that only present dharmas have "efficacy" (karitra); thus, they were able to explain how the present seems to function differently than the past or future.

Similarly, in order to explain how it is possible for a dharma to remain the same and yet also undergo change, as it moves through time, the Vaibhāṣika held that dharmas have a constant "essence" (svabhāva) which persists through all three. The term was also identified as a unique mark or self-characteristic (svalakṣaṇa) that differentiated a dharma, and which remained unchangeable throughout its existence. According to the Vaibhāṣika, svabhavas are those things that exist substantially (dravyasat), as opposed to those things which are made up of aggregations of dharmas and thus have only a nominal existence (prajñaptisat).

=== Dārṣṭāntika and Sautrāntika ===
The Sautrāntika ("those who uphold the sūtras"), also known as the Dārṣṭāntika (who may or may not have been a separate but related group), did not uphold the primacy of the Mahāvibhāṣa Śāstra but rather emphasized the sūtras as being authoritative.

Already by the time of the MVŚ, the early Dārṣṭāntika monks—such as Dharmatrāta and Buddhadeva—existed as a school of thought within the Sarvāstivādin fold, which disagreed with the orthodox views of the larger sect. The adherents of this nascent school were also referred to as the "western masters" (pāścātya) or the "foreign masters" (bahirdeśaka; also called the "masters outside Kaśmīra" and the "Gandhāran masters"). They studied the same Abhidharma texts as the rest of the Sarvāstivāda, but in a more critical way; according to Dhammajoti, they eventually came to repudiate the Sarvāstivāda doctrine of "all exists."

It is this group—i.e., those who rejected that most important Sarvāstivāda doctrine (along with numerous key Vaibhāṣika views)—which came to be called the Sautrāntika ("those who rely on the sūtras"). However, the Sautrāntikas did not reject the Abhidharma method; in fact, they were themselves the authors of several Abhidharma manuals, such as the Abhidharmahṛdaya. The later Buddhist tradition of pramāṇa, founded by the Buddhist monks Dignāga and Dharmakīrti, is also associated with the Sautrāntika school.

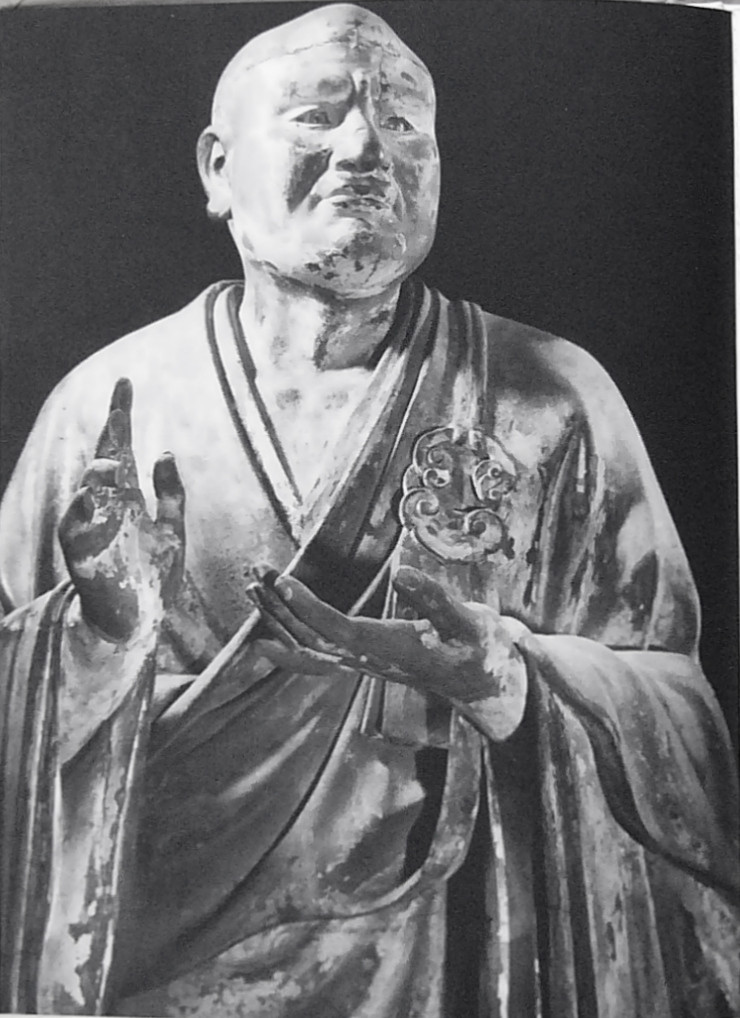
Vasubandhu: wood, 186 cm height, about 1208, Kofukuji Temple, Nara, Japan

The most important Sautrāntika was Vasubandhu (c. 350–430), a native of Purusapura in Gandhara. He is famous for being the author of the Abhidharmakośa (4–5th century CE), a very influential Abhidharma work, with an auto-commentary that defends the Sautrāntika views. He famously later converted to the Yogācāra school of Mahāyāna Buddhism, a tradition that itself developed out of the Sarvāstivāda Abhidharma.

Vasubandhu's Abhidharmakośa led to a vigorous reaction from his contemporary, the brilliant Vaibhāṣika master Saṃghabhadra, who is said to have spent 12 years composing the *Nyāyānusāra, a commentary upon Vasubandhu's verses meant to refute his views and those of other Sautrāntika monks (such as Sthavira Śrīlāta and his pupil Rāma). The Abhidharmakośa was so influential that it became the Abhidharma text par excellence in both Indo-Tibetan Buddhism and East Asian Buddhism, and remains the primary source for Abhidharma studies.

=== Mūlasarvāstivādins ===
There is much uncertainty as to the relationship between the Mūlasarvāstivāda (meaning root- or original-Sarvāstivāda) school and the others. They were certainly successful in spreading their Mūlasarvāstivāda Vinaya, which remains the monastic rule used in Indo-Tibetan Buddhism today; they seem also to have been influential in Indonesia by the 7th century, as noted by Yijing.

A number of theories have been posited by academics as to how the two are related, including:

- Frauwallner holds that the Mūlasarvāstivāda were the community of Mathura, which was independent from the Sarvāstivādins of Kaśmir. According to Bhikkhu Sujato, this theory has "stood the test of time."
- Lamotte thought that the Mūlasarvāstivāda Vinaya was a late compilation from Kaśmīr.
- Warder suggests that the Mūlasarvāstivādins were a late group who compiled a Vinaya and the Saddharmasmṛtyupasthāna Sūtra.
- Enomoto holds that the Sarvāstivādin and Mūlasarvāstivādin were the same.
- Willemen, Dessein, and Cox hold that this group is really the Sautrāntika school, which renamed itself in the later years of the Sarvāstivāda school history.

== Texts ==
=== Vinaya ===
The Dharmaguptaka are known to have rejected the authority of the Sarvāstivāda Prātimokṣa rules, on the grounds that the original teachings of the Buddha had been lost.

The complete Sarvāstivāda Vinaya is extant in the Chinese Buddhist canon. In its early history, the Sarvāstivāda Vinaya was the most common Vinaya tradition in China. However, Chinese Buddhism later settled on the Dharmaguptaka Vinaya. In the 7th century, Yijing wrote that in Eastern China, most people followed the Dharmaguptaka Vinaya, while the Mahāsāṃghika Vinaya was used in earlier times in Guanzhong (the region around Chang'an), and that the Sarvāstivāda Vinaya was prominent in the Yangzi River area and further south. In the 7th century, the existence of multiple Vinaya lineages throughout China was criticized by prominent Vinaya masters such as Yijing and Dao'an (654–717). In the early 8th century, Dao'an gained the support of Emperor Zhongzong of Tang, and an imperial edict was issued that the Saṃgha in China should use only the Dharmaguptaka Vinaya for ordination.

=== Āgamas ===
Whereas the Madhyama Āgama (T26, Chinese trans. Gauama Saṅghadeva) available in Chinese translation reflects a Sarvāstivāda lineage of transmission, the Saṃyukta Āgama (T99, Chinese trans. Baoyun) rather harks back to a Mūlasarvāstivāda reciter lineage. The same holds for recent discovery in Afghanistan of roughly two-thirds of the Dīrgha Āgama in Sanskrit. Even if the Mūlasarvāstivāda and Sarvāstivāda were to be considered in conjunction, still the only early school for which we have a complete sūtra collection remains the Theravāda.

=== Abhidharma ===
During the first century, the Sarvāstivāda Abhidharma primarily consisted of the Abhidharmahrdaya authored by Dharmashresthin, a native from Tokharistan, and the Ashtagrantha authored or compiled by Katyayaniputra. Both texts were translated by Samghadeva, in 391 CE and in 383 CE respectively, but they were not completed until 390, in Southern China.

The Sarvāstivāda Abhidharma consists of seven texts:

- Jñānaprasthāna ("Foundation of Knowledge") (T. 1543–1544)
- Prakaraṇapāda ("Exposition") (T. 1541–1542)
- Vijñānakāya ("Body of Consciousness") (T. 1539)
- Dharmaskandha ("Aggregation of Dharmas") (T. 1537)
- Prajñaptiśāstra ("Treatise on Designations") (T. 1538)
- Dhātukāya ("Body of Elements") (T. 1540)
- Saṅgītiparyāya ("Discourses on Gathering Together") (T. 1536)

Following these are the texts that came to be taken as authoritative by the Vaibhāṣika:

- Mahāvibhāṣā ("Great Commentary"), a commentary on the Jñānaprasthāna (T. 1545)

All of these works have been translated into Chinese, and are now part of the Chinese Buddhist canon. In the Chinese context, the word Abhidharma refers to the Sarvāstivāda Abhidharma, although at a minimum the Dharmaguptaka, Pudgalavāda and Theravāda also had Abhidharmas.

=== Later Abhidharma manuals ===
Various other Abhidharma works were written by Sarvāstivāda masters, some are more concise manuals of Abhidharma, others critiqued the orthodox Vaibhāṣika views or provided a defense of the orthodoxy. Dhammajoti provides the following list of such later Abhidharma works that are extant in Chinese:

- *Abhidharmāmṛta(-rasa-)śāstra (T. 1553), by Ghoṣaka, 2 fasc., translator unknown. 2.
- *Abhidharmahṛdaya (T. 1550) by Dharmaśrī, 4 fasc., tr. by Saṅghadeva et al. 3.
- *Abhidharmahṛdayasūtra (? T. 1551) by Upaśānta, 2 fasc., tr. by Narendrayaśas.
- *Abhidharmahṛdayavyākhyā (? T. 1552), by Dharmatrāta, 11 fasc., tr. by Sanghabhūti.
- Abhidharmakośamūlakārikā (T. 1560) by Vasubandhu, 1 fasc., tr. by Xuan Zang. 6.
- Abhidharmakośabhāṣyam (T. 1558) by Vasubandhu, 1 fasc., tr. by Xuan Zang; there is also an earlier translation by Paramārtha (T No. 1559).
- *Abhidharmakośaśāstra-tattvārthā-ṭīkā (T. 1561) by Sthiramati, 2 fasc., translator unknown.
- *Abhidharma-nyāyānusāra (T. 1562) by Saṃghabhadra, 40 fasc., tr. by Xuan Zang.
- *Abhidharma-samayapradīpikā (T. 1563) by Saṃghabhadra, 40 fasc., tr. by Xuan Zang.
- *Abhidharmāvatāra (T. 1554) by Skandhila, 2 fasc., tr. by Xuan Zang.

== Appearance and language ==
=== Appearance ===
Between 148 and 170 CE, the Parthian monk An Shigao came to China and translated a work which described the color of monastic robes (Skt. kāṣāya) utilized in five major Indian Buddhist sects, called Da Biqiu Sanqian Weiyi (大比丘三千威儀). Another text translated at a later date, the Śāriputraparipṛcchā, contains a very similar passage with nearly the same information. In the earlier source, the Sarvāstivādins are described as wearing dark red robes, while the Dharmaguptakas are described as wearing black robes. However, in the corresponding passage found in the later Śāriputraparipṛcchā, the Sarvāstivāda are described as wearing black robes and the Dharmagupta as wearing dark red robes.

In Tibetan Buddhism monasticism, which follows the Mūlasarvāstivāda Vinaya, red robes are regarded as characteristic of their tradition.

=== Language ===
During the first century BCE, in the Gandharan cultural area (consisting of Oddiyana, Gandhara and Bactria, Tokharistan, across the Khyber Pass), the Sthaviras used the Gāndhārī language to write their literature using the Kharosthi script.

The Tibetan historian Buton Rinchen Drub wrote that the Mahāsāṃghikas used Prākrit, the Sarvāstivādins used Sanskrit, the Sthavira Nikāya used Paiśācī, and the Saṃmitīya used Apabhraṃśa.

== Influence ==
The Sarvāstivādins of Kāśmīra held the Mahāvibhāṣā Śāstra as authoritative, and thus were given the moniker Vaibhāṣikas. The Mahāvibhāṣā is thought to have been authored around 150 CE, around the time of Kaniṣka (127–151) of the Kushan Empire. This massive treatise of Abhidharma (200 fascicles in Chinese) contains a great deal of material with what appear to be strong affinities to Mahāyāna doctrines. The Mahāvibhāṣā is also said to illustrate the accommodations reached between the Hīnayāna and Mahāyāna traditions, as well as the means by which Mahāyāna doctrines would become accepted. The Mahāvibhāṣā also defines the Mahāyāna sūtras and the role in their Buddhist canon. Here they are described as Vaipulya doctrines, with "Vaipulya" being a commonly used synonym for Mahāyāna. The Mahāvibhāṣā reads:

What is the Vaipulya? It is said to be all the sūtras corresponding to elaborations on the meanings of the exceedingly profound dharmas.

According to a number of scholars, Mahāyāna Buddhism flourished during the time of the Kuṣāṇa Empire, and this is illustrated in the form of Mahāyāna influence on the Mahāvibhāṣā Śāstra. The Mañjuśrīmūlakalpa also records that Kaniṣka presided over the establishment of Prajñāpāramitā doctrines in the northwest of India. Étienne Lamotte has also pointed out that a Sarvāstivāda master is known to have stated that the Mahāyāna prajñā-sūtras were to be found amongst their own Vaipulya sūtras. According to Paul Williams, the similarly massive Da Zhidu Lun also has a clear association with the Vaibhāṣika Sarvāstivādins.

The Vaibhāṣika and Sautrāntika subschools are both classified in the Tibetan tenets system as the two tenets of the Hīnayāna, ignoring other early Indian Buddhist schools, which were not known to the Tibetans.

Sarvāstivādin meditation teachers also worked on the Dhyāna sūtras (Chinese: 禪經), a group of early Buddhist meditation texts which were translated into Chinese and became influential in the development of Chinese Buddhist meditation methods.
