= Hinayana =

Term for preliminary Buddhism before Mahayāna

Hīnayāna (Sanskrit: /ˌhiːnəˈjɑːnə/, हीनयान), literally meaning "Small Vehicle" or "Lesser Vehicle", is an umbrella term used by the Mahāyāna school to refer to the pre-Mahāyāna Buddhist paths to liberation. Specifically, it encompasses the Śrāvakayāna ("Listeners Vehicle") and Pratyekabuddhayāna ("Solitary-Realizers Vehicle") paths. Some Mahāyāna Buddhists consider the Hīnayāna as preliminary, individual-focused (hīna) pathways or "vehicles" (yāna) towards liberation offered by the Buddha's teachings, in contrast to the "greater" (mahā) vehicle (yāna) or second path, esteemed more highly as devoted to helping all beings seek enlightenment (bodhicitta), and not just oneself.

Some early Western scholars adopted the term Hīnayāna to describe the early teachings of Buddhism, as the Mahāyāna teachings were generally given later. Modern Buddhist scholarship has deprecated the term Hinayana as derogatory and polemical, and instead uses the term Nikāya referring to the early Buddhist schools. Hīnayāna has also been inappropriately used as a synonym for the Theravāda Buddhist school, which is the main tradition of Buddhism in Sri Lanka and Southeast Asia.

"In 1950 the World Fellowship of Buddhists inaugurated in Colombo unanimously decided that the term Hinayana should be dropped when referring to Buddhism existing today in Sri Lanka, Thailand, Burma, Cambodia, Laos, etc".

== Etymology ==
The word hīnayāna is formed from the adjective hīna (Devanagari: हीन) meaning "little", "poor", "inferior", "abandoned", "deficient", "defective"; and the noun yāna (Devanagari: यान): "vehicle", where "vehicle" or "path" refers to "a way of life that leads to enlightenment". The Pali Text Society's Pāli-English Dictionary (1921–1925) defines hīna in even stronger terms, with a semantic field that includes "poor, miserable; vile, base, abject, contemptible", and "despicable".

The term Hīnayāna was translated by Kumārajīva and others into Classical Chinese as "small vehicle" (小 meaning "small", 乘 meaning "vehicle"), although earlier and more accurate translations of the term also exist. In Mongolian (Baga Holgon) the term for Hīnayāna also means "small" or "lesser" vehicle or better called path, while in Classical Tibetan there are at least two words to designate the term: theg chung, meaning "small vehicle", and theg dman, meaning "inferior vehicle" or "inferior spiritual approach".

According to Tibetan Buddhist monk and Kagyu master Thrangu Rinpoche, the term Hīnayāna is in no way implying that the Śrāvakayāna ("Listeners Vehicle") and Pratyekabuddhayāna ("Solitary-realizers Vehicle") are somehow "inferior" Buddhist paths to liberation in comparison to the later two vehicles (i.e., Mahāyāna and Vajrayāna). In his translation and commentary of Asaṅga's Distinguishing Dharmā from Dharmāta, he writes: "all three traditions of Hīnayāna, Mahāyāna, and Vajrayāna were practiced in Tibet, and the Hīnayāna, which literally means "lesser vehicle", is in no way inferior to the Mahāyāna".

== Origins ==
According to Jan Nattier, it is most likely that the term Hīnayāna postdates the term Mahāyāna and was only added at a later date due to antagonism and conflict between proponents of the Bodhisattva and Arhat ideals within the Saṃgha. The sequence of terms then began with the term Bodhisattvayāna ("Bodhisattva Vehicle"), which was given the epithet Mahāyāna ("Great Vehicle"). It was only later, after attitudes toward the Bodhisattva ideal had become more critical, that the term Hīnayāna ("Small Vehicle" or "Lesser Vehicle") was created as a back-formation, contrasting with the already established term Mahāyāna.

The earliest Mahāyāna texts often use the term Mahāyāna as an epithet and synonym for Bodhisattvayāna but the term Hīnayāna is comparatively rare, and the latter is usually not found at all in the earliest translations. Therefore, the often-perceived symmetry between Mahāyāna and Hīnayāna can be deceptive, as the terms were not actually coined in relation to one another in the same era.

According to Paul Williams, "the deep-rooted misconception concerning an unfailing, ubiquitous fierce criticism of the Lesser Vehicle by the [Mahāyāna] is not supported by our texts". Williams states that while evidence of conflict is present in some cases, there is also substantial evidence demonstrating peaceful coexistence between the two traditions.

== Mahāyāna members of the early Buddhist schools ==
Although the 18–20 early Buddhist schools are sometimes loosely classified as Hīnayāna in modern times, this is not necessarily accurate. There is no evidence that Mahāyāna ever referred to a separate formal school of Buddhism but rather as a certain set of ideals, and later doctrines. Paul Williams has also noted that the Mahāyāna never had nor ever attempted to have a separate vinaya or ordination lineage from the early Buddhist schools, and therefore bhikṣus and bhikṣuṇīs adhering to the Mahāyāna formally adheres to the vinaya of an early school. This continues today with the Dharmaguptaka ordination lineage in East Asia and the Mūlasarvāstivāda ordination lineage in Tibetan Buddhism. Mahāyāna was never a separate sect of the early schools. From Chinese monks visiting India, we now know that both Mahāyāna and non-Mahāyāna monks in India often lived in the same monasteries side by side.

The seventh-century Chinese Buddhist monk and pilgrim Yijing wrote about the relationship between the various "vehicles" and the early Buddhist schools in India. He wrote, "There exist in the West numerous subdivisions of the schools which have different origins, but there are only four principal schools of continuous tradition." These schools are the Mahāsāṃghika Nikāya, Sthavira nikāya, Mūlasarvāstivāda Nikāya, and Saṃmitīya Nikāya. Explaining their doctrinal affiliations, he then writes, "Which of the four schools should be grouped with the Mahāyāna or with the Hīnayāna is not determined." That is to say, there was no simple correspondence between a Buddhist school and whether its members learn "Hīnayāna" or "Mahāyāna" teachings.

To identify entire schools as "Hīnayāna" that contained not only śrāvakas and pratyekabuddhas but also Mahāyāna bodhisattvas would be attacking the schools of their fellow Mahāyānists as well as their own. Instead, what is demonstrated in the definition of Hīnayāna given by Yijing is that the term referred to individuals based on doctrinal differences.

== Hīnayāna as Śrāvakayāna ==
Scholar Isabelle Onians asserts that although "the Mahāyāna ... very occasionally referred to earlier Buddhism as the Hinayāna, the Inferior Way, [...] the preponderance of this name in the secondary literature is far out of proportion to occurrences in the Indian texts." She notes that the term Śrāvakayāna was "the more politically correct and much more usual" term used by Mahāyānists. Jonathan Silk has argued that the term "Hinayana" was used to refer to whomever one wanted to criticize on any given occasion, and did not refer to any definite grouping of Buddhists.

== Hīnayāna and Mahāyāna ==
=== Views of Chinese pilgrims ===
The Chinese monk Yijing, who visited India in the 7th century, distinguished Mahāyāna from Hīnayāna as follows:

Both adopt one and the same Vinaya, and they have in common the prohibitions of the five offenses, and also the practice of the Four Noble Truths. Those who venerate (regard with great respect) the bodhisattvas and read the Mahāyāna sūtras are called the Mahāyānists, while those who do not perform these are called the Hīnayānists.

In the 7th century, the Chinese Buddhist monk Xuanzang describes the concurrent existence of the Mahāvihara and the Abhayagiri vihāra in Sri Lanka. He refers to the monks of the Mahāvihara as the "Hīnayāna Sthaviras" and the monks of Abhayagiri vihāra as the "Mahāyāna Sthaviras". Xuanzang further writes, "The Mahāvihāravāsins reject the Mahāyāna and practice the Hīnayāna, while the Abhayagirivihāravāsins study both Hīnayāna and Mahāyāna teachings and propagate the Tripiṭaka."

=== Philosophical differences ===
Mahayanists were primarily in philosophical dialectic with the Vaibhāṣika school of Sarvāstivāda, which had by far the most "comprehensive edifice of doctrinal systematics" of the nikāya schools. With this in mind it is sometimes argued that the Theravada would not have been considered a "Hinayana" school by Mahayanists because, unlike the now-extinct Sarvastivada school, the primary object of Mahayana criticism, the Theravada school does not claim the existence of independent dharmas; in this it maintains the attitude of early Buddhism. Additionally, the concept of the bodhisattva as one who puts off enlightenment rather than reaching awakening as soon as possible, has no roots in Theravada—or Sarvastivada—textual or cultural contexts. Aside from the Theravada schools being geographically distant from the Mahayana, the Hinayana distinction is used in reference to certain views and practices that had become found within the Mahayana tradition itself. Theravada, as well as Mahayana schools stress the urgency of one's own awakening in order to end suffering. Some contemporary Theravadin figures have thus indicated a sympathetic stance toward the Mahayana philosophy found in the Heart Sutra and the Mūlamadhyamakakārikā.

The Mahayanists were bothered by the substantialist thought of the Sarvāstivādins and Sautrāntikins, and in emphasizing the doctrine of śūnyatā, David Kalupahana holds that they endeavored to preserve the early teaching. The Theravadins too refuted the Sarvāstivādins and Sautrāntikins (and followers of other schools) on the grounds that their theories were in conflict with the non-substantialism of the canon. The Theravada arguments are preserved in the Kathavatthu.

=== Opinions of scholars ===
Some western scholars still regard the Theravada school to be one of the Hinayana schools referred to in Mahayana literature, or regard Hinayana as a synonym for Theravada. These scholars understand the term to refer to schools of Buddhism that did not accept the teachings of the Mahāyāna sūtras as authentic teachings of the Buddha. At the same time, scholars have objected to the pejorative connotation of the term Hinayana and some scholars do not use it for any school.

Robert Thurman writes, "'Nikaya Buddhism' is a coinage of Professor Masatoshi Nagatomi of Harvard University, who suggested it to me as a usage for the eighteen schools of Indian Buddhism to avoid the term 'Hinayana Buddhism,' which is found offensive by some members of the Theravada tradition." Thurman explains his own use of the term when he writes:

Lest any reader be offended by any presumed derogatory tone implied in the term, let me make clear that I mean "individual" (not "inferior") by "Hīna-," and "universal" (not "superior") by "Mahā-" of Mahāyāna. The former aims at individual liberation, not stressing the cultivation of love and compassion (maitrīkaruṇā). The latter aims at universal liberation, heavily stressing those virtues, but also including the necessity for individual liberation at the same time.

Within Mahayana Buddhism, there were a variety of interpretations as to whom or to what the term Hinayana referred. Kalu Rinpoche stated the "lesser" or "greater" designation "did not refer to economic or social status, but concerned the spiritual capacities of the practitioner". Rinpoche states:

The Small Vehicle is based on becoming aware of the fact that all we experience in samsara is marked by suffering. Being aware of this engenders the will to rid ourselves of this suffering, to liberate ourselves on an individual level, and to attain happiness. We are moved by our own interest. Renunciation and perseverance allow us to attain our goal.

== Sources ==
- Analayo, Bhikkhu (2014), "The Hinayana Fallacy" (PDF), Journal of the Oxford Centre for Buddhist Studies (6): 9–31
- Collins, Steven (1990), Selfless Persons: Imagery and Thought in Theravāda Buddhism, Cambridge University Press, ISBN 978-0521701488
- Gombrich, Richard (2006), Theravāda Buddhism, Routledge, ISBN 978-0415-36508-6
- Hirakawa, Akira; Groner, Paul (2007), History of Indian Buddhism: From Sakyamuni to Early Mahayana, Motilal Banarsidass, hdl:10125/23030, ISBN 978-8120809550
- Hoffman, Frank J.; Mahinda, Deegalle (1996), Pāli Buddhism, Routledge, ISBN 978-0700703593
- Kalupahana, David (2015), Mulamadhyamakakarika of Nagarjuna, Motilal Banarsidass, ISBN 978-8120807747
- King, Richard (1999), Indian Philosophy: An Introduction to Hindu and Buddhist Thought, Georgetown University Press, ISBN 978-0878407569
- LeVine, Sarah; Gellner, David N. (2007), Rebuilding Buddhism: The Theravada Movement in Twentieth-Century Nepal, Harvard University Press, ISBN 978-0674025547
- Lopez, Donald Jr. (2005), The Madman's Middle Way: Reflections on Reality of the Tibetan Monk Gendun Chopel, University of Chicago Press, ISBN 978-0226493169
- Nattier, Jan (2003), A Few Good Men: The Bodhisattva Path according to The Inquiry of Ugra (Ugraparipṛcchā), University of Hawaii Press, p. 174 (footnote 6), ISBN 978-0824830038
- Rinpoche, Kalu (1995), Profound Buddhism From Hinayana To Vajrayana, Clearpoint Press, ISBN 978-0963037152
- Rinpoche, Khenchen Thrangu (2004), Distinguishing Dharma and Dharmata, A Commentary on The Treatise of Maitreya, Zhyisil Chokyi Ghatsal Charitable Trust, ISBN 978-1877294334
- Swearer, Donald (2006), "Theravada Buddhist Societies", in Juergensmeyer, Mark (ed.), The Oxford Handbook of Global Religions, Oxford University Press, ISBN 978-0195137989
- Thera, Nyanaponika; Bodhi, Bhikkhu (1998), Abhidhamma Studies: Buddhist Explorations of Consciousness and Time, Wisdom Publications, ISBN 978-0861711352
- Williams, Jane; Williams, Paul (2004), Buddhism: Critical Concepts in Religious Studies, Volume 3., Routledge, ISBN 978-0415332293
- Williams, Paul (2000), Buddhist Thought: A Complete Introduction to the Indian Tradition, ISBN 978-0415207010
- Williams, Paul (2009), Mahayana Buddhism: The Doctrinal Foundations, Routledge, ISBN 978-0-415-35653-4
