= Vijnanakaya =

Abhidharma Buddhist scripture

Vijñānakāya (Sanskrit: विज्ञानकाय) or Vijñānakāya-śāstra (विज्ञानकायशास्त्र) is one of the seven Sarvāstivāda Abhidharma Buddhist scriptures. "Vijñānakāya" means "group or substance of consciousness". It was composed by Devasarman (according to both Sanskrit and Chinese sources), with the Chinese translated by Xuanzang: T26, No. 1539, 阿毘達磨識身足論, 提婆設摩阿羅漢造, 三藏法師玄奘奉 詔譯, in 16 fascicles.

Vijñānakāya is the first Abhidharma text that is not attributed to a direct disciple of the Buddha, but written some 100 years after the Buddha's parinirvana, according to Xuanzang's disciple Puguang. Yin Shun however, concludes it was composed around the 1st century CE, and was influenced by the Jñānaprasthāna, though differs in several aspects. In this regard, he likens it to the Prakaranapada, which is also a different position on the Sarvāstivāda as a whole.

This is an esteemed Sarvāstivāda text wherein the Sarvāstivāda is upheld against Vibhajyavada objections, in the first of its six sections. It is here that the theory of "sarva-asti", the existence of all dharmas through past, present and future, is first presented. The issue is only brought up when Moggaliputta-tissa makes the standard claim of the Vibhajyavada, "past and future (dharmas) do not exist, (only) present and unconditioned (dharmas) do exist". The Vijñānakāya has four main theses to refute this:

1. The impossibility of two simultaneous cittas
2. The impossibility of karma and vipāka being simultaneous
3. That vijñāna only arises with an object
4. Attainments are not necessarily present.

In addition to refuting the Vibhajyavāda view, the second section is a refutation of the Vatsiputriya Pudgalavada claim of: "the paramartha of the ārya [truths] can be attained, can be realized by the 'pudgala', present and complete, therefore it is certainly [the case] that the 'pudgala' exists". The Sarvāstivāda take the title 'śūnyatāvāda' in order to refute this claim, though this obviously means "empty of pudgala", rather than the later Śunyavāda of the Mahāyāna, i.e. the Madhyamaka. The first refutation centres on the two extremes of "absolute identity" and "absolute difference". The second hinges on the continuity of the existence of the skandhas in the past, present and future – Sarvāstivāda – proper.

The third and fourth sections concern the causal condition, and the conditioning object of vijnana respectively. The fifth includes the two other conditions, the immediate condition and predominant condition. These conditions are discussed in terms of their realm, nature, temporal location, etc. in a format that came to be standard for the Sarvāstivāda Abhidharma. Such a system also appears in Abhidharma type analysis of dharmas in the Mahāprajñāpāramitā Sūtra and Mahāprajñāpāramitāupadeśa. The remaining five sections are doctrinal elaborations of the Sarvāstivāda school, including issues regarding perception, dependent origination and conditionality
