= Saṃghabhadra =

5th century Buddhist monk

Sanghabhadra (5th century CE, Sanskrit: संघभद्र, Ch. 僧伽跋陀羅・衆賢, Japanese: Sōgyabaddara or Shugen) was an Indian scholar monk of the Sarvāstivāda Vaibhāṣika and "undoubtedly one of the most brilliant Abhidharma masters in India". Born in Kashmir, he was a contemporary of the Buddhist philosopher Vasubandhu. According to K.L. Dhammajoti, his work forms the most mature and refined form of Vaibhāṣika philosophy. His two main works, the *Nyāyānusāra (Ch. 順正理論, Shun zhengli lun; "In Accordance with the Truth") and the *Abhidharmasamayapradīpikā (Ch. 阿毘達磨顯宗論, Apidamo xian zong lun; "Treatise Clarifying the Treasury of Abhidharma"), are very important sources for late Vaibhāṣika thought. He is referenced by various important Buddhist figures, such as Xuanzang, Kuiji, Sthiramati, and Śāntarakṣita who see him as the most authoritative of the Vaibhāṣika Abhidharmikas.

Saṃghabhadra's philosophical work was primarily an attempt to defend the orthodox doctrines of the Vaibhāṣika school from the attacks of its main opponents, the Sautrantikas—especially Vasubandhu, who had written the Abhidharmakośabhasya as an exposition as well as a critique of Vaibhāṣika doctrine. Saṃghabhadra is said to have spent 12 years composing the *Nyāyānusāra (a commentary to Vasubandhu's verses) to refute Vasubandhu and other Sautrāntikas (such as the elder Śrīlāta, and his pupil Rāma).

According to Xuanzang's records, after composing his works, Saṃghabhadra sought out Vasubandhu in order to face him in public debate, but died before he was able to do so.
