= Prakaranapada =

Prakaranapada (Sanskrit: प्रकरणपादशास्त्र, IAST: Prakaraṇapāda-śāstra), composed by Vasumitra, is one of the seven Sarvastivada Abhidharma Buddhist scriptures. The Chinese was translated by Xuanzang as: T26, No. 1542, 阿毘達磨品類足論, 尊者世友造, 三藏法師玄奘奉 詔譯, in 18 fascicles; with another partial translation by Gunabhadra and Bodhiyasa: T26, No. 1541, 眾事分阿毘曇論, 尊者世友造, 宋天竺三藏求那跋陀羅, 共菩提耶舍譯, in 12 fascicles. Its commentary the Panca-vastu-vibhasa (五事毘婆沙論 T 1555) by Dharmatrata, was also translated by Xuanzang.

Prakaranapada is the major text of the central Abhidharma period. It influenced other non-Sarvastivada schools, though not in the polarizing manner that the later Jnanaprasthana and Vibhasa texts did. Its format for dharma analysis is used, for example, by the Maha-prajna-paramitopadesa, which also states that the first four chapters were composed by Vasumitra, with the other four chapters by Kasmira arhats. Yin Shun considers this Vasumitra to be the same Vasumitra who appears in the Mahavibhasa later.

This seems to indicate that before the later formalization of Sarvastivada doctrines, the Vijnana-kaya and Prakaranapada were perhaps representative of several differing lines of thought, though were only later overshadowed by the Vibhasa and its orthodoxy. It would be interesting to perhaps trace some of these differences through the likes of Buddhadeva and Dharmatrata, as they are presented in the Vibhasa.

Prakaranapada contains two systems of dharma classification, one fivefold, the other sevenfold. It was the former fivefold system that later became the standard format, and was important for the establishment of the respective characteristics, nature and functions of the various dharmas, especially the caitasika and citta-viprayukta-dharmas. The sevenfold system bears some similarities to Pāli Abhidhamma, and seems to make of categories of dharmas that are all sutra based.

It also expands on the traditional fourfold theory of conditionality, by introducing some 20 types of condition, in paired dharmas. Although these are not the later sixfold classification, this may have opened the door for later innovation.
