= Prajnaptisastra =

Prajnaptisastra (Sanskrit: प्रज्ञाप्तिशास्त्र, IAST: Prajñāptiśāstra) or Prajnapti-sastra is one of the seven Sarvastivada Abhidharma Buddhist scriptures. The word Prajnaptisastra means "designation" (of dharmas). It was composed by Maudgalyayana (according to the Sanskrit, Tibetan and MPPU) or Mahakatyayana. The Chinese translation is by Dharma-rakṣita: T26, No. 1538, 施設論, 西天譯經三藏朝散大夫, 試光祿卿傳梵大師賜紫, 沙門臣法護等奉 詔譯, in a somewhat shorter 7 fascicles.

The importance of this text is shown in its being quoted 135 times by the MVS , though these references are not exclusively Sarvastivada in nature. The format is of matrka, followed by question and answer explanations, with references to the sutras for orthodoxy.

Yin Shun relates the name prajnapti through the Chinese 施設 and 假 to the Śāriputrābhidharma in regards the "false designation" of the bonds (saṃyojana), contact (sparsa) and mind (citta), thus indicating that it is a very early text.

Willemen, Dessein & Cox assign this text to the next period, based on its "abstract principles of organization" and "complexity of doctrinal analysis". However, though the content is different from the Samgiti and Dharma-skandha, one could scarcely consider it more abstract in nature. It simply reflects the nature of the sūtras upon which it is based. In fact, it has relatively more direct references to the sūtras for its overall size than many of the developed texts, and a similar use of questions and answers as the Samgita.
