= Mulasarvastivada =

Early Buddhist school of India

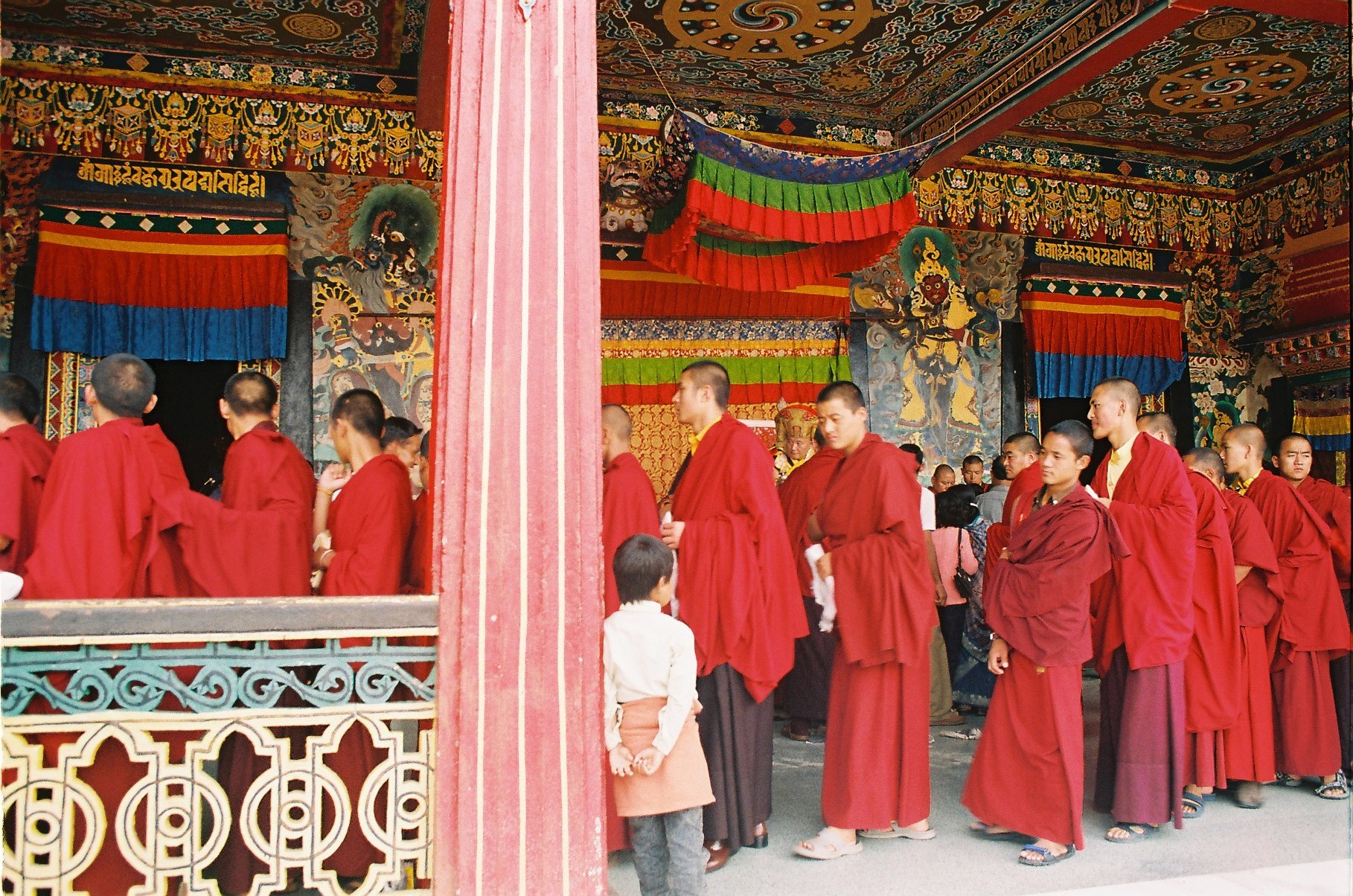
Tibetan Buddhist bhikṣus of the Mūlasarvāstivāda ordination lineage

The Mūlasarvāstivāda (Sanskrit: 𑀫𑀽𑀮𑀲𑀭𑁆𑀯𑀸𑀲𑁆𑀢𑀺𑀯𑀸𑀤; traditional Chinese: 根本說一切有部; ; pinyin: Gēnběn Shuō Yīqièyǒu Bù; Vietnamese: Căn bản thuyết nhất thiết hữu bộ) was one of the early Buddhist schools of India. The origins of the Mūlasarvāstivāda school and their relationship to the Sarvāstivāda remain largely unknown, although various theories exist.

The continuity of the Mūlasarvāstivāda monastic order remains in Tibetan Buddhism, although until recently, only Mūlasarvāstivādin bhikṣus (monks) existed. The Tibetan Buddhist tradition of bhikṣuṇī (nuns) officially commenced in Bhutan on 23 June 2022, when 144 women were ordained. Previously, bhikṣuni ordinations were only administered in Taiwan, and later in Bodh Gaya, India.

== History ==
=== In India ===
The relationship of the Mūlasarvāstivāda to the Sarvāstivāda school is a matter of dispute; modern scholars lean towards classifying them as independent. Yijing claimed that they derived their name from being an offshoot of Sarvāstivāda, but Buton Rinchen Drub stated that the name was a homage to Sarvāstivāda as the "root" (mūla) of all Buddhist schools. A number of theories have been posited by academics as to how the two are related, which Bhikkhu Sujato summaries as follows:

The uncertainty around this school has led to a number of hypotheses. Frauwallner’s theory holds that the Mūlasarvāstivāda Vinaya is the disciplinary code of an early Buddhist community based in Mathura, which was quite independent in its establishment as a monastic community from the Sarvāstivādins of Kaśmir (although of course this does not mean that they were different in terms of doctrine). Lamotte, opposing Frauwallner, asserts that the Mūlasarvāstivāda Vinaya was a late Kaśmīr compilation made to complete the Sarvāstivādin Vinaya. Warder suggests that the Mūlasarvāstivādins were a later development of the Sarvāstivāda, whose main innovations were literary, the compilation of the large Vinaya and the Saddharmasmṛtyupasthāna Sūtra, which kept the early doctrines but brought the style up to date with contemporary literary developments. Enomoto pulls the rug out from all these theories by asserting that Sarvāstivādin and Mūlasarvāstivādin are really the same. Meanwhile, Willemen, Dessein, and Cox have developed the theory that the Sautrantikas, a branch or tendency within the Sarvāstivādin group of schools, emerged in Gandhāra and Bactria around 200 CE. Although they were the earlier group, they temporarily lost ground to the Kaśmīr Vaibhāśika school due to the political influence of Kaṇiṣka. In later years the Sautrantikas became known as Mūlasarvāstivādins and regained the ascendancy. I have elsewhere given my reasons for disagreeing with the theories of Enomoto and Willemen et al. Neither Warder nor Lamotte give sufficient evidence to back up their theories. We are left with Frauwallner's theory, which in this respect has stood the test of time.

According to Gregory Schopen, the Mūlasarvāstivāda developed during the 2nd century CE and went into decline in India by the 7th century.

=== In Central Asia ===
The Mūlasarvāstivāda were prevalent at times throughout Central Asia due to missionary activities performed in the region. A number of scholars identify three distinct major phases of missionary activities seen in the history of Buddhism in Central Asia, which are associated with the following sects chronologically:

1. Dharmaguptaka
2. Sarvāstivāda
3. Mūlasarvāstivāda

=== In Champa ===
According to the monk Yijing, at the end of the 7th century, Buddhist monks in Champa generally either belonged to the Sammitiya Nikāya and the Mūlasarvāstivāda Nikāya. The latter's adherents would pull up their robes on both sides, pull the ends through the belt and hang them over it.

=== In Śrīvijaya ===
In the 7th century, Yijing writes that the Mūlasarvāstivāda were prominent throughout the kingdom of Śrīvijaya (modern day Sumatra, Indonesia). Yijing stayed in Śrīvijaya for six to seven years, during which time he studied Sanskrit and translated Sanskrit texts into Chinese. Yijing states that the Mūlasarvāstivāda Vinaya was almost universally adopted in this area. He writes that the subjects studied, as well as the rules and ceremonies, were essentially the same in this region as they were in India. Yijing described these islands as generally "Hīnayāna" in orientation, but writes that the Melayu Kingdom included Mahāyāna teachings such as Asaṅga's Yogācārabhūmi Śāstra.

=== In Japan ===
Kukai, the founder of the Shingon lineage in Japan, is recorded to have required his students to study the Mūlasarvāstivāda Vinaya.

== Vinaya lineage ==
The Mūlasarvāstivāda Vinaya is one of three surviving Vinaya lineages, along with the Dharmaguptaka and Theravāda. The Tibetan Emperor Ralpachen restricted Buddhist ordination to the Mūlasarvāstivādin Vinaya. As Buddhism was introduced to Mongolia from Tibet, Mongolian ordination follows this rule as well.

The Mūlasarvāstivāda Vinaya is extant in Tibetan (9th century translation) and Chinese (8th century translation), and to some extent in the original Sanskrit.
