= Dhatukaya =

Dhatukaya (Sanskrit: धातुकाय, IAST: Dhātukāya) or Dhatukaya-sastra (धातुकाय शास्त्र) is one of the seven Sarvastivada Abhidharma Buddhist scriptures.

Dhatukaya means "group of elements". It was written by Purna (according to Sanskrit and Tibetan sources), or Vasumitra (according to Chinese sources; five people named Vasumitra were known to the Chinese sources, but it is not clear which one of these authored Dhatukaya). It was translated into Chinese translated by Xuanzang: T26, No. 1540, 阿毘達磨界身足論, 尊者世友造, 三藏法師玄奘奉 詔譯, in a short 3 fascicles.

This comparatively short text bears similarities with the Pāli Sthaviravada text, the Dhatu-katha, in style and format, though it uses a different matrika. It also bears a close connection with the Prakaranapada, through several items common to both. In its sevenfold division of dharmas in particular, it does provide, a closer look at the various divisions of dharmas, in particular citta and caitasika, with its conjoined and non-conjoined aspects. As it is not mentioned in the Mahavibhasa, this also suggests it is either a later text, or originally a fragment removed from an earlier text.
