= Abhidharma Mahāvibhāṣa Śāstra =

Ancient Buddhist text

The Abhidharma Mahāvibhāṣā Śāstra (Sanskrit: अभिधर्ममहाविभाषशास्त्रम्) is an ancient Buddhist text. It is thought to have been authored around 150 CE. It is an encyclopedic work on Abhidharma—scholastic Buddhist philosophy. Its composition led to the founding of a new doctrinal school, called Vaibhāṣika ("those [upholders] of the Vibhāṣā"), which was very influential in the history of Buddhist thought and practice.

== The Vibhāṣā Compendia ==
Vibhāṣā is a Sanskrit term—derived from the prefix vi + the verbal root √bhāṣ, "speak" or "explain"—meaning "compendium", "treatise", or simply "explanation". Evidence strongly indicates that there were originally many different Vibhāṣā texts, mainly commenting on the Jñānaprasthāna, but also commenting on other Abhidharma texts too. The relationship between all of these texts is very complex, as there is mutual influence between them, and the texts underwent some development from initial inception to completion. The Taishō canon has three, however, which are compendiums on the Jñānaprasthāna and its "six legs": the Abhidharma Mahāvibhāṣā Śāstra (T1545), the Abhidharma Vibhāṣā Śāstra (T1546) and the Vibhāṣā Śāstra (T1547).

The tradition of the Mahāvibhāṣā states that it was taught by the Buddha himself, but differs as to the circumstances; one Kātyayanīputra was credited with its later compilation. The Mahā-prajñā-pāramitopadeśa (which actually refers to the Aṣṭaskandha) states that 100 years after the Buddha's demise, there arose doctrinal disputes among the great masters, giving rise to distinctly named schools.

Xuanzang states that it was written some four centuries after the Buddha, which would be c. 50 BCE.

== Abhidharma Mahāvibhāṣā Śāstra, by Kātyāyanīputra ==
Of these three, the Abhidharma Mahāvibhāṣā Śāstra is considered most prominent. Its authorship is traditionally attributed to five hundred arhats, some 600 years after the parinirvāṇa of the Buddha. Its compilation, however, is attributed to Kātyāyanīputra. This date and authorship are based on the Chinese translation, also by Xuanzang, and other historical considerations. It appears in the Taishō Tripitaka in its own volume (T27, No. 1545, 阿毘達磨大毘婆沙論, 五百大阿羅漢等造, 三藏法師玄奘奉 詔譯), due to its huge size: a massive 200 fascicles—which makes up a third of the total Abhidharma literature, and is larger than the previous (Abhidharma) texts combined. The Vibhāṣā Śāstra is an older translation, translated by Buddhavarman and Daotai (T28, No. 1546, 阿毘達磨毘婆沙論, 迦旃延子造, 五百羅漢釋, 北涼天竺沙門浮陀跋摩共道泰等譯).

=== Contents ===
As a lengthy text, it contains a wide range of material. This includes discussions of many doctrinal issues of the day, as put forth by other—non-Sarvāstivādin—Buddhist schools, such as the Vibhajyavāda, the Pudgalavāda, the Mahāsāṃghika, and others; non-Buddhist systems, such as the Saṃkhya, the Vaiśeṣika, and others; and, finally, the Sarvāstivāda school, as represented in the works of various leaders therefrom.

As regards the former two, their "unorthodox" and "incorrect" doctrines are taken to task from the perspective of the Sarvāstivādins; with regard to the latter, several views are often expressed as elaborations of (presumably-) orthodox Sarvāstivāda doctrines. These are often open-ended, with no one explanation favored over another, though sometimes a particular explanation is extolled as being particularly clear and in harmony with the teachings.

Due to the above two reasons, the Vibhāṣā literature is particularly useful not only in understanding the Sarvāstivāda, but also in obtaining a relatively detailed perspective on the then-current state of both the Buddhadharma and other, non-Buddhist religions.

== Sarvāstivāda of Kāśmīra ==
The Sarvāstivāda of Kāśmīra held the Mahāvibhāṣā as authoritative, and thus were given the moniker of being Vaibhāṣikas—"those [upholders] of the Vibhāṣā". Some scholars believe that some of the other, now-lost Vibhāṣā texts may have represented a similar authoritative work, as held by the Gandhāra Sarvāstivāda or other centers of orthodoxy. It was due to the predominance of this text and its teachings at the time that Vasubandhu engaged in the study thereof, as a compendium that encompassed all of the essential doctrines.

== Mahāyāna history ==
The Mahāvibhāṣā contains a great deal of doctrinal material with a strong affinity to Mahāyāna doctrines. According to Karl Potter, the information in the Mahāvibhāṣā concerning the Mahāyāna is of considerable importance. The text employs a schema of Buddhist practice that consists of the Three Vehicles:

1. Śrāvakayāna
2. Pratyekabuddhayāna
3. Bodhisattvayāna

It also describes accommodations reached between the Hīnayāna and Mahāyāna traditions, as well as the means by which Mahāyāna doctrines would become accepted. The Mahāvibhāṣā defines the Mahāyāna teachings, which are described as Vaipulya (Ch. 方廣)—a commonly used synonym for the Mahāyāna teachings—as follows:

What is the Vaipulya? It is said to be all the sūtras corresponding to elaborations on the meanings of the exceedingly profound dharmas.

According to a number of scholars, Mahāyāna Buddhism flourished during the time of the Kuṣāṇa Empire, and this is illustrated in the form of Mahāyāna influence on the Mahāvibhāṣā. The Mañjuśrīmūlakalpa also records that Kaniṣka presided over the establishment of Prajñāpāramitā doctrines in the northwest of India. According to Paul Williams, the similarly massive Mahā-prajñā-pāramitopadeśa also has a clear association with the Vaibhāṣika Sarvāstivādins.

References to the (Mahāyāna) ideal of the Bodhisattvayāna, and to the practice of the Six Pāramitās, are commonly found in Sarvāstivāda works. The Sarvāstivādins did not hold that it was impossible, or even impractical, to strive to become a fully enlightened buddha (Skt. samyaksaṃbuddha), and therefore they admitted the path of a bodhisattva as a valid one.
