= Paul Williams (Buddhist studies scholar) =

Buddhist studies scholar (born 1950)

Paul Williams (born 1950) is Emeritus Professor of Indian and Tibetan Philosophy at the University of Bristol, England, where he had been Head of the Department of Theology and Religious Studies. Until his retirement in 2011 he was also director for the University's Centre for Buddhist Studies, and is a former president of the UK Association for Buddhist Studies

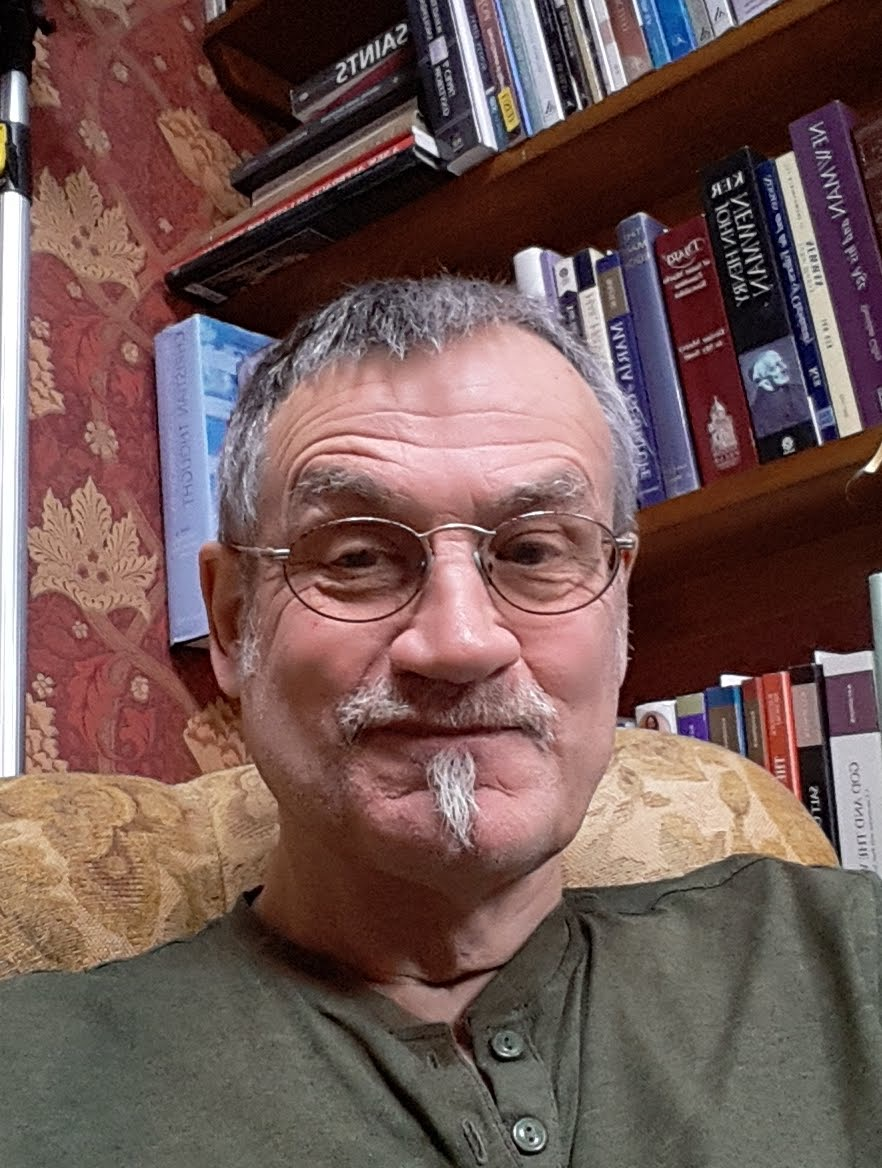
Paul Williams (Buddhist Studies scholar)

== Biography ==
Williams studied at Simon Langton Grammar School, Canterbury and the University of Sussex's School of African & Asian Studies where he graduated with a first class BA in 1972. He then went on to study Buddhist Philosophy at Wolfson College and Wadham College, University of Oxford, where he was the Bowra Research Fellow and awarded his DPhil in 1978. His main research interests are Madhyamaka Buddhist philosophy, Mahayana Buddhism, and Medieval philosophical and mystical thought.

Williams was a Buddhist himself for many years but has since converted to Roman Catholicism, an experience he wrote about in his book The Unexpected Way and in an article, "On converting from Buddhism to Catholicism – One convert's story." He is now a professed lay member of the Dominican Order.

Williams has been married to Sharon since 1971 and they have three adult children (Myrddin, Tiernan and Tara), six grandchildren and two great grandchildren (2025).

== Select bibliography ==
- Mahayana Buddhism: The Doctrinal Foundations (London: Routledge, 1989; Completely revised Second Edition, 2009). ISBN 978-0-415-35653-4. Translations of First Edition in Italian, Polish and Korean.
- The Reflexive Nature of Awareness: A Tibetan Madhyamaka Defence (Richmond: Curzon Press, 1998). ISBN 978-0-7007-1030-0
- Altruism and Reality: Studies in the Philosophy of the Bodhicaryavatara (Richmond: Curzon Press, 1998). ISBN 978-0-7007-1031-7
- (with Anthony Tribe) Buddhist Thought: A Complete Introduction to the Indian Tradition (London: Routledge, 2000; completely revised Second Edition, with Anthony Tribe and Alexander Wynne, 2011). ISBN 978-0-415-57179-1. Translations of First Edition in Italian, Korean and Czech.
- The Unexpected Way: On Converting from Buddhism to Catholicism (London: Continuum/T & T Clark, 2002). ISBN 978-0-567-08830-7. Translations in German and Polish.
- Songs of Love, Poems of Sadness: The Erotic Verse of the 6th Dalai Lama (I.B. Tauris, 2004). ISBN 978-1-85043-479-5
- ’Aquinas meets the Buddhists: Prolegomenon to an authentically Thomas-ist basis for dialogue’, in Aquinas in Dialogue: Thomas for the Twenty-First Century Edited by Jim Fodor and Frederick Christian Bauerschmidt (Oxford: Blackwell, 2004), pp. 87-117. ISBN 978-1-405-11931-3
- Buddhism: Critical Concepts in Religious Studies Edited and with a new introduction by Paul Williams (London: Routledge, 2005). Eight volumes. ISBN 978-0-415-33226-2
- Buddhism from a Catholic Perspective (London: Catholic Truth Society, 2006). ISBN 978-1-86082-404-3
- 'Catholicism and Buddhism', in The Catholic Church and the World Religions Edited by Gavin D'Costa (London: Continuum, 2011), pp. 141–177. ISBN 978-0-567-46697-6
- Buddhist Funeral Cultures of Southeast Asia and China Edited by Paul Williams and Patrice Ladwig (Cambridge: Cambridge University Press, 2012). ISBN 978-1-107-00388-0
