= Jnanaprasthana =

Abhidharma text of the Sarvastivada tradition

The Jñānaprasthāna (Sanskrit: ज्ञानप्रस्थान) or Jñānaprasthāna-śāstra (ज्ञानप्रस्थानशास्त्र), composed originally in Sanskrit by Kātyāyanīputra, is one of the seven Sarvastivada Abhidharma Buddhist scriptures; the title Jñānaprasthāna means "establishment of knowledge".

The Jñānaprasthāna was translated from Sanskrit into Chinese by Xuanzang (T26, No. 1544: 阿毘達磨發智論, 尊者迦多衍尼子造, 三藏法師玄奘奉 詔譯), in 20 fascicles. It also appears under the name Aṣṭaskandha-śāstra in the Taisho, with the translation by Saṅghadeva, Zhu Fonian and Dharmapriya (T26, No. 1543: 阿毘曇八犍度論, 迦旃延子造, 符秦罽賓三藏僧伽提婆, 共竺佛念譯), in a slightly larger 30 fascicles. There is a slight difference in format between the two, perhaps indicating that they are different recensions from various sub-schools of the Sarvāstivāda.

The tradition of the Mahāvibhāṣa states that it was taught by the Buddha himself, but differs as to the circumstances; in any case, it was the later Kātyayanīputra who was responsible for its compilation. The Mahā-prajñā-pāramitopadeśa (which actually refers to the Aṣṭaskandha) states that 100 years after the Buddha's parinirvana, there arose doctrinal disputes among the great masters, giving rise to distinctly named schools. Xuanzang, however, asserted that it was written some three centuries after the Buddha, which would be c. 100 BCE.

The orthodox Vibhāṣa takes this as the ‘root’ Abhidharma, though references are sometimes made to the Prakaraṇapāda in the same terms. It became known as the ‘body’ of the Abhidharma, with the six remaining texts of the early period known as the ‘legs’ or ‘supports’. This is based on textual authority, and not a temporal definition, given the respective historical order of these seven treatises. That is, the Jñānaprasthāna is not sourced from the six legs, but neither is it directly sourced from the sūtras. This is also a reminder that these texts were likely in a state of constant revision and update, for possibly several hundred years. There are thus mutual references and borrowings between them that stymy any attempt at a simple sequential ordering.

The outline of the text more closely approximates that earliest of models, the Sāriputra Abhidharma, than those specifically Sarvāstivāda treatises. This is evidenced in its use of the samyojanas, prajna, karma, indriya, mahabhuta, dhyana and drsti as main divisions. A similar system is later continued through into the Kośa and Hṛdaya texts.

Prior to this is a division of "assorted issues"; the analysis is of three main types, according to Yinshun:

1. Analysis of the sutras themselves — to find the actual underlying principle, rather than accepting the content at face value, which could lead to apparent contradiction. This indicates the Abhidharmika standpoint of taking the Abhidharma as pramana in understanding the doctrine.
2. Analysis of the nature, or characteristics, of individual dharmas — rather than the use of sūtra categories pertaining to spiritual praxis, the tendency here is to group by type. Thus, dharmas are assigned as either rūpa, citta, caitasika or citta-viprayukta, the conditioned dharmas, and the unconditioned dharmas. Specifics as to each type are given, as well as detailed discussions of related dharmas. These are then again categorized according to their being with or without outflows; visible or non-visible; past, present or future; as to realm; and so forth.
3. Analysis of the relationship between various dharmas — as the preceding analysis lends itself to plurality, and the possibility of falling into independent Sāṃkhya-type realities, this analysis completes the Buddhist teaching of dependent origination, preventing such an error. Using kṣaṇika theory, it establishes the "sixfold conditionality" theory that would later become a special feature of Sarvāstivāda doctrine. This is the earliest text in which the theory appears.

The influence of the Jñānaprasthāna is seen strongly in the Vibhāṣa, and this influenced the subsequent Hṛdaya texts, as well as the Kośa and commentaries.
