= Dharmapriya =

Dharmapriya is both a given name and a surname. Notable people with the name include:

- Dharmapriya Dias, Sri Lankan actor
- Somapala Dharmapriya (1940–1992), Sri Lankan actor
- Lal Dharmapriya Gamage (born 1954), Sri Lankan politician
