= Pudgalavada =

Buddhist philosophical view

The Pudgalavāda (Sanskrit: "Personalism"; Pali: Puggalavāda; Chinese: 補特伽羅論者; pinyin: Bǔtèjiāluō Lùnzhě; Vietnamese: Bổ-đặc-già-la Luận giả) was a Buddhist philosophical view and also refers to a group of Nikāya Buddhist schools (mainly known as Vātsīputrīyas) that arose from the Sthavira Nikāya. The school is believed to have been founded by the elder Vātsīputra in the third century BCE. They were a widely influential school in India and became particularly popular during the reign of emperor Harshavadana (606–647 CE). Harsha's sister Rajyasri was said to have joined the school as a nun. According to Dan Lusthaus, they were "one of the most popular mainstream Buddhist sects in India for more than a thousand years".

== Doctrines ==
=== Pudgala thesis ===
The Pudgalavādins asserted that while there is no ātman, there exists a pudgala (person) or sattva (being) which is neither a conditioned dharma nor an unconditioned dharma. This doctrine of the person was their method of accounting for karma, rebirth, and nirvāṇa. For the Pudgalavādins, the pudgala was what underwent rebirth through successive lives in saṃsāra and what experiences nirvāṇa. They defended this view through philosophical argument as well as scriptural citation. According to Thiện Châu and Richard Gombrich, they used the Bhārahārasūtras as a major reference for their view. This text states that the person (pudgala) is the bearer of the five aggregates, and that the taking up of them is craving and suffering:

Bhārā have pañcakkhandhā, bhārahāro ca puggalo; Bhārādānaṁ dukhaṁ loke, bhāranikkhepanaṁ sukhaṁ.
The five aggregates are truly burdens, and the burden-carrier is the person. Taking up the burden is suffering in the world; Laying the burden down is blissful.

The Kathāvatthu also mentions that the Pudgalavādins relied on the following statements by the Buddha: "There is a person who exerts for his own good" and "There appears a person who is reborn for the good and happiness of many, for showing compassion to the world of beings." The Pudgalavādins held that this person was "inexpressible" and indeterminate in its relation to the five aggregates and could not be said to be neither the same as the aggregates nor different. However, the person could not be denied entirely, for if this were so, nothing would get reborn and nothing would be the object of loving-kindness meditation. Thus, according to L. S. Cousins:

The difference is that for the voidist the person is a label for the aggregates experienced as objects of consciousness whereas for the personalist the relationship between the person and those objects cannot be described as either the same nor different.

Thus this pudgala was the subject of experiences, the doer of wholesome and unwholesome actions, and the experiencer of karma, transmigration and nirvāṇa. Yet it was also "indefinable" (avāktavya), neither a conditioned (saṃskṛta) nor an unconditioned dharma (nirvāṇa) and neither the same as nor different from the five aggregates. However, as Thiện Châu notes in his survey of their literature, the Pudgalavādins carefully developed this theory especially to be compatible with anātman and the Middle Way and thus the pudgala is "not an absolute reality totally separated from compounded things."

The Abhidharmakośa shows how the Pudgalavādins explained their theory by using the analogy of fire and fuel. The five aggregates are the fuel and the pudgala the fire. The fire exists as long as there is fuel, but it is not the same as the fuel and has properties that the fuel does not. They are co-existent and the fuel (aggregates) are the support for the fire (pudgala), and thus are not the same nor wholly different. For the Pudgalavādins, if one says that the person is the same as the aggregates (the reductionist Buddhist view of other schools), this is like saying fire and fuel are the same thing, which is one mistake. On the other hand, if one says that fire and fuel are totally different, this is like saying fire does not depend on fuel, a second mistake (related to non-Buddhist views). Thus they took a middle road between these and argued for a person which is neither identical to the aggregates nor different from them. They sought to refute the view of other Buddhists that the aggregates and the person were the same. They held that, at death when the aggregates are destroyed, the person would then also be destroyed, thus not be reborn. They also believed it contradicted the Buddha's words i.e. "the bearer of the burden" exists.

The Kathāvatthu also mentions that the pudgala can be likened to what is called a being (sattva) and also to what is called jiva (life force), but that it is neither identical nor different from the body (kaya). One Pudgalavādin text explains the nature of this relationship as being based on clinging or appropriation (upādāna):

The designation of appropriation (upādāna-prajñapti) is the designation of life (jiva) (which is) internal appropriation (upādāna) in the present and is composed of the aggregates (skandha), elements (dhātu) and domains (āyatana); that is to say that the phenomena of appropriation concerning the internal life in the present, which is formed by compounded things – (saṃskāra) and the fetters is what is called the designation of appropriation.

The Pudgalavādins also seem to have held that the liberated person exists even after parinirvāṇa in a state of supreme bliss, or as Thiện Châu notes, they saw nirvāṇa as "a transcendental domain" and an "existence in the beyond".

=== Three designations of the pudgala ===
According to the Pudgalavādin text known as the Traidharmakaśāstra, the pudgala can be designated in three ways, called the three prajñaptis:

1. The pudgala designated by the bases (āśraya -prajiñapta-pudgala). This refers to the person which cannot be said to be identical to the aggregates or different to them. Thich Thien Chau names this as "the essential factor that unifies a person's life processes. Stated otherwise, it is the pudgala that appropriates and sustains a body for a certain amount of time."
2. The pudgala designated by transmigration (sankrama-prajiñapta-pudgala), refers to the fact that an individual cannot be said to be the same nor different to who they were in a past life and will be in the future. This allows for a subject which is karmically responsible for their actions. According to the Pudgalavādins, if there is a continuity in between lifetimes, there must be the possessor of that continuity as well as that which individuates a person from others and is the subject of experiences, this is the pudgala.
3. The pudgala designated by cessation (nirodha-prajiñapta-pudgala), which refers to the fact that after death, a Buddha cannot be said to be existent, non-existent, both or neither.

Regarding the first form of designation, Dan Lusthaus adds that:

If the appropriator is something different from the skandhas themselves, then there is a sixth skandha, which is doctrinally impermissible. If the skandhas appropriate themselves, that leads to a vicious cycle of infinite regress. Hence, the Vātsīputrīya argue, the nominal person (pudgala) is neither the same as nor different from the skandhas. It is a heuristic fiction that avoids these unwarranted consequences and lends coherence by also corresponding to how actual persons experience themselves—that is, as distinct individuals continuous with, but not absolutely identical to or reducible to, their own pasts and futures.

Lusthaus also explains their reasoning for the second and third designations as follows:

But what remains constant or continuous between such [past and future] lives? If it is a self-same invariant identity, then this would indeed be a case of atmavada, a view the Vātsīputrīyas, like all Buddhists, reject. In what sense would someone be the same or different from the person in one's previous life? If completely different, then to posit a continuity between them is incoherent. If the same, then their real discontinuities are ignored, leading to a form of eternalism, another impermissible view for Buddhists. Hence, they are neither the same nor different, but linked by a fictional pudgala. Finally, Buddhist practice leads to nirvana; but who attains this? If there is an integral individual that ceases on attaining nirvana, then this would entail the unwarranted view of annihilationalism. If there is no cessation of the karmic individual, then there is no nirvana. Both extremes, though implicit in standard Buddhist formulations, render Buddhism itself incoherent, a problem only solved, the Vātsīputrīyas argue, if one admits the fictional pudgala implicit in standard Buddhist doctrine.

With this system, Pudgalavādins held that they could explain karmic moral retribution and personal identity by positing an ineffable (avaktavya) dharma that avoids falling into the extremes of annihilation (ucceda) and eternity (sasvata). One Pudgalavāda text affirms that this doctrine is a Middle Way thus:

If the pudgala could be described in terms of existence or non-existence, one would fall into nihilism (ucchedadristi) or eternalism (sasvatadrsti), but the Buddha does not allow us to uphold there two opinions. If one says that the pudgala does not exist, that is committing a fault in the order of the questions to be avoided. That expression is not justified. Why? If one affirms that no pudgala exists, that is a fake view (mithyadrsti). If (on the contrary), one affirms that the pudgala exists (conditionally), that is a right view (samyagdrsti). That is why it is possible to say that the pudgala exists.

=== Criticism ===
Because they felt that Vātsīputrīya views were close to the view of a self or ātman, they were sharply criticised by the Vibhajyavādins (a record of this is found in the Theravādin Kathāvatthu), as well as by the Sarvastivādins (in the Vijñanakaya), Sautrantikas (most famously in the Abhidharmakośa), and the Madhyamaka school (Candrakirti's Madhyamakavatara). The earliest source for the pudgala doctrinal controversy is the Puggalakatha of the Kathāvatthu, attributed to Moggaliputtatissa (c. third century BCE).

The Buddhist philosopher Vasubandhu argued against the pudgala theory in his Abhidharmakośa. Vasubandhu begins by stating that the Vātsīputrīya hold that the pudgala 'is based' on the five aggregates, and that this could mean one of two things:

1. The five aggregates form an object, the pudgala. In this case, pudgala is just a nominal designation for the five aggregates, and not an independent object.
2. The pudgala is caused by the aggregates. In this case, pudgala also refers to just the aggregates and not to something else independent of them.

Vasubandhu argues then that 'pudgala' is identical to the aggregates and just a label for them. Vasubandhu first argues that we can either perceive the pudgala directly or perceive it by perceiving the aggregates. If the latter, then its just a label for aggregates. If we perceive it directly, then the aggregates would be based on the pudgala, not the other way around. Vasubandhu also attacks the view that we can perceive the pudgala by all six senses. If this is true, then the pudgala is nothing but the five aggregates since all that the senses perceive is their direct sense impressions and nothing more.

=== Other doctrines ===
According to Thich Thien Chau, other secondary theses of the personalist Vātsīputrīya-Saṃmitīyas include:

1. There exists an indestructible entity (avipranasa). This helps explain the mechanism for the retribution of actions. The indestructible entity continues to exist throughout the flux of existences, and is the essential base for the accumulation and maturation of karma.
2. There are twelve knowledges on the path of seeing (darśanamārga).
3. There are four stages in the concentration of access: patience (kṣānti), name (nāma), notion (samjña) and the highest worldly dharma (laukikāgradharma).
4. Clear comprehension (abhisamaya) is gradual (anupūrva).
5. The five supernormal penetrations can be obtained by ordinary beings or heretics.
6. Morality (śila) designates (actions of) body and speech.
7. Merit (puṇya) is accumulated continually, even during sleep.
8. It is impossible to say whether the characteristic of phenomena (dharmalabana) is permanence or impermanence.
9. There is an intermediate dhyana (dhyānantara) between the first and second dhyanas.
10. There is only one absolute asaṃskṛta dharma: nirvāṇa.
11. There are five, six or seven destinies (gati).
12. Knowledge (jñana) also can be called the path (mārga).
13. An arahant is susceptible of falling from his attainment.
14. There is an intermediate state (antarabhava) in the sensuous realm (kāmadhātu) and the form realm (rūpadhātu), but not in the formless realm (arūpadhātu).
15. There are seventeen categories of celestial beings in the form realm.

== Texts ==
The school had a Tripiṭaka, with Sūtra Piṭaka (in four Āgamas), Vinaya Piṭaka and Abhidharma Piṭakas, like other early Buddhist schools. Only four of their texts survive in Chinese translation:

1. The San fa tu lun, Traidharmakaśāstra, Taishō Tripiṭaka XXV, 1506.
2. The Ssu a-han-mu ch'ao chieh, Taishō Tripiṭaka XXV, 1505.
3. The San-mi-ti pu lun, Sammatiyanikayaśāstra, Taishō Tripiṭaka XXXII. 1649.
4. The Lu erh-shih-erh ming-liao lun, Vinayadvavimsatividyaśāstra, Taishō Tripiṭaka XXIV. 1461.

One surviving Pudgalavāda text is the Traidharmakaśāstra (Taishō Tripiṭaka XXV, 1506 pp. 15c-30a), an Abhidharma work which was translated twice into Chinese. The text mentions that lack of knowledge also includes lack of knowledge of the indefinable (avyākṛta), which refers to the pudgala. Another Pudgalavāda text, the Sammatiyanikayaśāstra, put forth various arguments for and against the following propositions:

1. There is no self
2. Self neither exists nor does not exist
3. Self exists
4. Self is the same as the five aggregates
5. Self is different than the five aggregates
6. Self is eternal
7. Self is not eternal

All of these views are ultimately rejected. The text claims that the pudgala is neither an existent nor a purely conceptual construct.

== Modern Scholarship ==
Peter Harvey agrees with criticisms leveled against the Pudgalavādins by Moggaliputta-Tissa and Vasubandhu, and finds that there is no support in the Pali Nikāyas for their pudgala concept.

However, according to Bhikṣu Thiện Châu:

The creation of the theory of the pudgala represents a reaction against the "depersonalization" of the abhidharmika tradition. The Pudgalavadins, on the other hand, tried to preserve the essence of the doctrine of substancelessness (anātmavāda). The theory of the pudgala has been misinterpreted by the polemical literature; nevertheless, it offers much of doctrinal interest to Buddhist thinkers.

Furthermore, Thiện Châu in his analysis of their doctrine adds:

The Pudgalavadins were probably not satisfied with the interpretation according to which a man is merely the result of a combination of psycho-physical factors. For a man is something different from a chariot; the latter is only an assemblage of parts and separate pieces whereas the former is essentially a being with its totality of which the psycho-physical parts develop after conception and birth.

According to Dan Lusthaus, "no Buddhist school has been more vilified by its Buddhist peers or misunderstood by modern scholars." Lusthaus argues that, far from promoting the view of a self (ātmavāda), the Vātsīputrīya position which can be seen in their surviving texts is that the pudgala is "a prajñapti (only a nominal existent) that is neither identical to nor different from the skandhas." Furthermore:

The Vātsīputrīya argument is that the pudgala is a necessary prajñapti since any theory of karma, or any theory that posits that individuals can make spiritual progress for themselves or can assist other individuals to do likewise, is incoherent without it. Karma means that an action done at one time has subsequent consequences for the same individual at a later time, or even a later life. If the positive and negative consequences of an action don't accrue to the self-same individual, then it would make no sense to speak of things like progress (who is progressing?), and Buddhist practice itself becomes incoherent. If there are no persons, then there is no one who suffers, no one who performs and reaps the consequences of his or her own karma, no Buddha, no Buddhists, and no Buddhism. Obviously, those are not acceptable consequences for a Buddhist.

Lusthaus notes that for the Vātsīputrīyas, their theory is simply an attempt to explain what other Buddhist traditions leave unsaid and assumed, mainly what it is that undergoes rebirth, has moral responsibility and attains enlightenment. According to Lusthaus, for the Vātsīputrīyas, "while other Buddhists might leave the word "pudgala" unsaid, the narratives presupposed in their doctrines require it."

== Saṃmitīya and other sub-schools ==
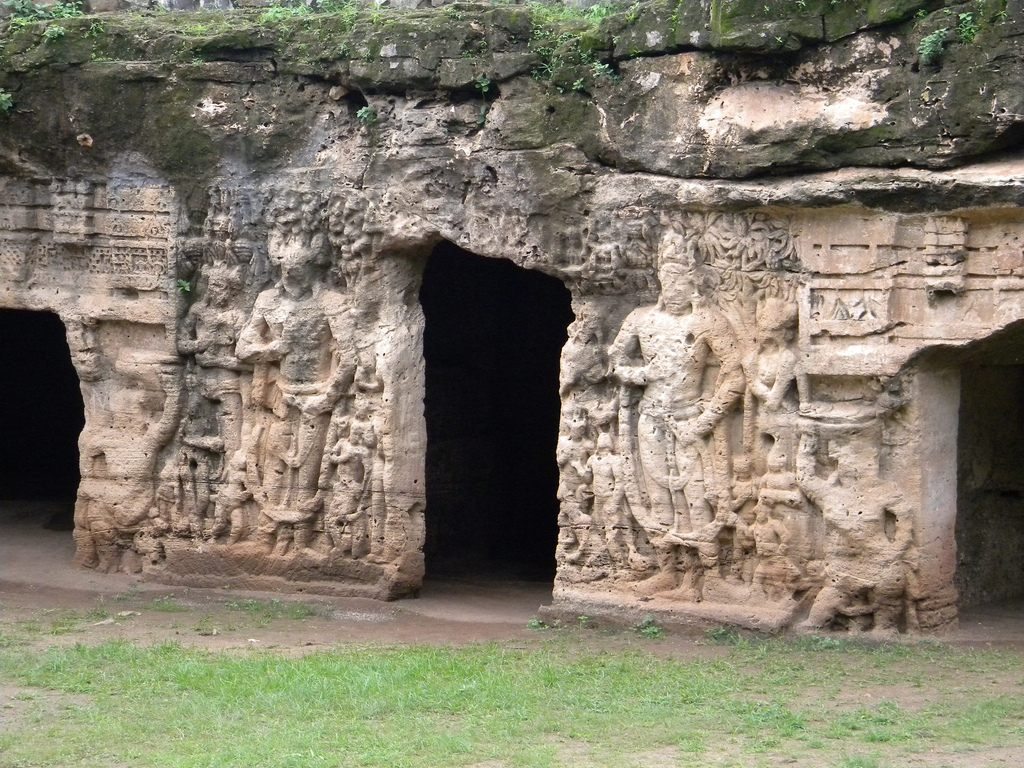
Khambhalida Buddhist Caves, Gujarat.

According to Thiện Châu, the Vātsīputrīyas were the initial parent school out of which branched off four sub-schools (sometime between the 1st century BCE and the 1st century CE); mainly the Saṃmitīyas, Dhammuttariyas, Bhadrayanikas, and the Sandagarikas. The Vātsīputrīya communities were established in Kosambi and Sarnath, living side by side with the Saṃmitīyas, a school which quickly eclipsed them in popularity.

The most prominent of the Pudgalavādin schools were certainly the Saṃmitīyas (Sanskrit; Chinese: 正量部; pinyin: Zhèngliàng Bù) who were especially prominent in Sindh and in Gujarat during the Maitraka dynasty (470–788 CE). Inscriptions have also established the existence of Saṃmitīya communities in Mathura and Sarnath between the 2nd and 4th centuries. The Tibetan historian Buton Rinchen Drub noted that the Saṃmitīya used Apabhraṃśa as their main language. By the 4th century, this school had become so influential that they replaced the Sarvastivādins in Sarnath as the most prominent school. By the time of King Harsha in the seventh century, they were the largest Nikāya Buddhist school in India. Due to their geographic spread, this led to them being divided into two further sub-schools, the Avantakas centered in Avanti and the Kurukulas centered around Kuru on the upper Ganges.

Their most influential center of learning was at Valabhi University in Gujarat, which remained an important place for the study of Nikāya Buddhism until the 8th century. Yijing, who visited Gujarat in 670 CE, noted that the Sammitiyas had the greatest number of followers in Western India and that the learning center at Valabhi rivaled that of Nalanda.

Étienne Lamotte, using the writings of the Chinese traveler Xuanzang, asserted that the Saṃmitīya were in all likelihood the most populous non-Mahāyāna sect in India, comprising double the number of the next largest sect, although scholar L. S. Cousins revised his estimate down to a quarter of all non-Mahāyāna monks, still the largest overall. The Saṃmitīya sect seems to have been particularly strong in the Sindh, where one scholar estimates 350 Buddhist monasteries were Saṃmitīya of a total of 450. This area was rapidly Islamised in the wake of the Arab conquest. They continued to be a presence in India until the end of Indian Buddhism, but, never having gained a foothold elsewhere, did not continue thereafter.

Ancient sources such as Xuanzang and Tibetan historian Tāranātha reported that the Saṃmitīyas were staunch opponents of Mahāyāna. According to Tāranātha, Saṃmitīya monks from the Sindh burned tantric scriptures and destroyed a silver image of Hevajra at Vajrāsana monastery in Bodh Gaya. In the biography of Xuanzang, it is recounted that an elderly Brahmin and follower of the Saṃmitīya sect named Prajñāgupta composed a treatise in 700 verses which opposed the Mahāyāna teachings. In response, while living at Nālandā, Xuanzang wrote a Sanskrit work in 1600 verses to refute this text, called The Destruction of Heresy.

== See also ==
- Nikāya Buddhism
- Early Buddhist schools
- Schools of Buddhism
