= K. L. Dhammajoti =

Bhikkhu Kuala Lumpur Dhammajoti

Personal life
- Born: Lim Poi Cheng; May 29, 1944 (age 82) Kuala Lumpur, Malaysia

Religious life
- Religion: Buddhism
- School: Theravāda
- Sect: Amarapura–Rāmañña Nikāya

Senior posting
- Based in: Hong Kong, China

K. L. Dhammajoti (born 29 May 1949 as Lim Poi Cheng) (吉隆坡法光; Jílóngpō Fǎguāng) is a Buddhist monk from Kuala Lumpur, Malaysia. He was ordained according to the Theravāda tradition of Buddhism.

He has made academic contributions to Sarvāstivāda Abhidharma. These include some of his own personal work, such as Sarvastivada Abhidharma, The Chinese Version of the Dhammapada, Entrance into the Supreme Doctrine, and Abhidharma Doctrines and Controversies on Perception. He is also the founding editor of an annual academic Journal of Buddhist Studies from the Centre for Buddhist Studies, Sri Lanka. Currently, he is serving as the director of Buddha-Dharma Centre of Hong Kong Ltd.
