= Vibhajyavāda =

Early school of Buddhism

Vibhajyavāda (Sanskrit; Pali: Vibhajjavāda; traditional Chinese: 分別說部; ; pinyin: Fēnbiéshuō Bù; Vietnamese: Phân biệt thuyết bộ, Phân tích bộ) is a term applied generally to groups of early Buddhists belonging to the Sthavira Nikāya, which split from the Mahāsāṃghika (due either to the former attempting to make the Vinaya stricter, or the latter wishing to reform it; see: Sthavira Nikāya main article) into two main groups: the Sarvāstivāda and the Vibhajyavāda, of which the latter are known to have rejected both Sarvāstivāda doctrines (especially the doctrine of "all exists") and the doctrine of Pudgalavāda (personalism). During the reign of Ashoka, these groups possibly took part in missionary activity in Gandhara, Bactria, Kashmir, South India and Sri Lanka. By the third century CE, they had spread in Central Asia and Southeast Asia. Their doctrine is expounded in the Kathāvatthu.

== Nomenclature and etymology ==
The word Vibhajyavāda may be parsed into vibhajya, loosely meaning "dividing", "analysing"; and vāda, corresponding to the semantic field "doctrine", "teachings". According to Andrew Skilton, the analysis of phenomena (Skt. dharmas) was the doctrinal emphasis and preoccupation of the Vibhajyavādins.

According to A. K. Warder, they are called "distinctionists" because they make distinctions between dharmas that exist in the present and the past, and dharmas that don't exist in the past and the future (as opposed to the Sarvāstivāda view that all such dharmas exist). This is supported by the explanation given by the 6th century Mahāyāna philosopher Bhavaviveka.

According to Bhante Sujato, Vibhajyavāda means that the doctrine "distinguishes" (vibhajanto) the heterodox and orthodox views, particularly the non-Buddhist theory of a self (atman) as well as the theory of a pudgala (or "person", similar to but distinct from the atman) of the Pudgalavādins (also known as the Vātsīputrīya). The characteristic method used by the Buddha and early Buddhists to break down the idea of self was the method of analysing (vibhajjati) the components of a person and investigating them to find that they do not possess the features that one could ascribe to a self. Thus, it would make sense that the term refers to "the Abhidhamma movement as an analytic approach to Dhamma in general, and as a critique of the ‘self’ in particular".

== Overview ==
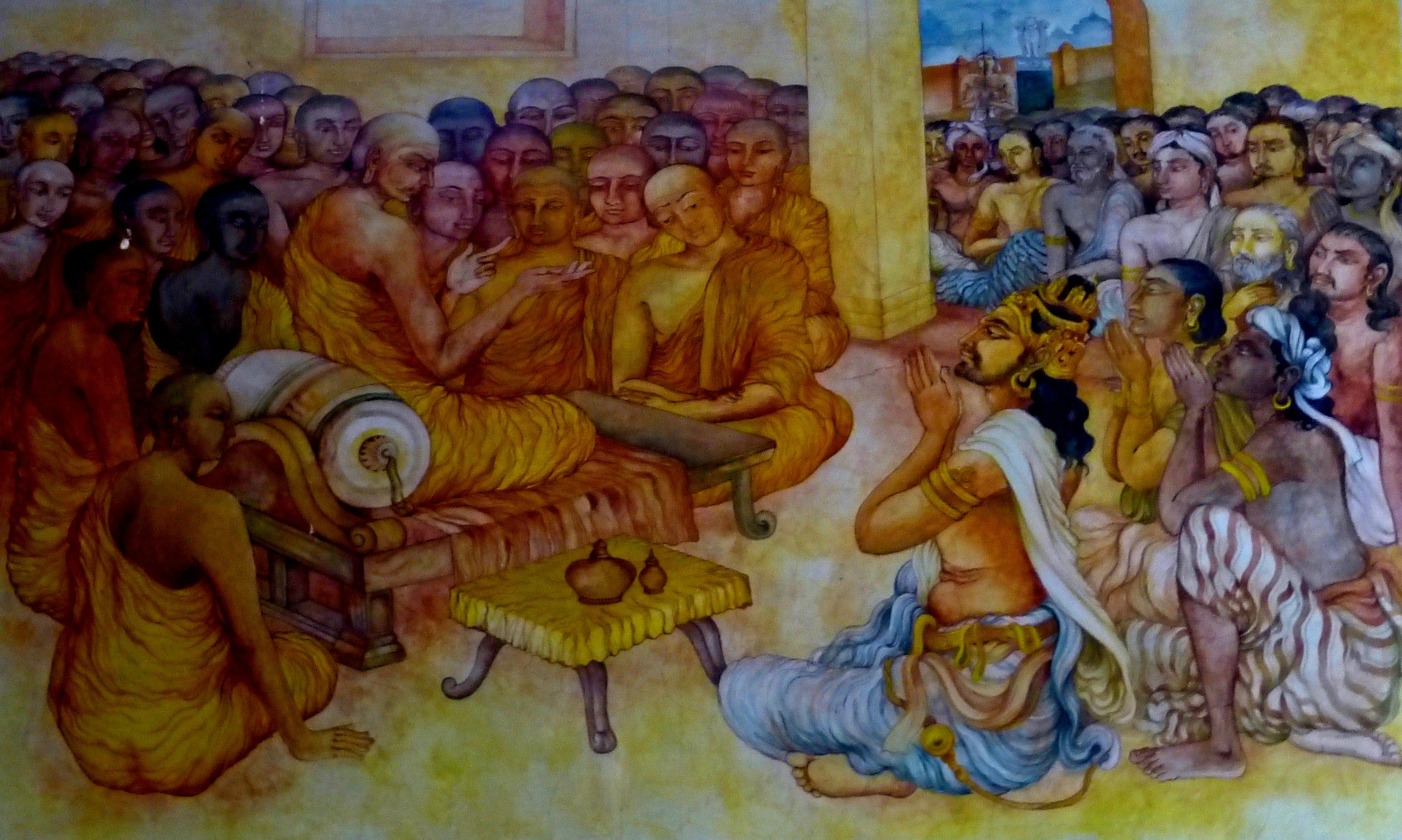
As per the traditional Theravāda account, elder Moggaliputta-Tissa defended the Vibhajyavāda doctrine under Aśoka at the Third Buddhist Council.

The Vibhajyavādins are a group of early Buddhist schools. According to the Theravāda account, this group rejected the Sarvastivāda teachings at the Third Buddhist Council (however modern scholars question the council narratives). The name means "those who make distinctions," and include the Kāśyapīya, Mahīśāsaka and Dharmaguptaka. The Vibhajyavādins were strongly represented in South India, where they called themselves Theriyas. They survived until the seventeenth century in South India, and in Sri Lanka they became the Theravādins.

The Vibhajyavādins rejected the Sarvāstivāda claim that all dharmas (principles, phenomena) exist in the past, present and future. Instead, they made a distinction between dharmas that "exist" and dharmas that do not exist, hence the name "distinctionists". The Vibhajyavādins held that dharmas exist in the present, but not that they exist in the future. With regards to past dharmas, those wholesome or unwholesome dharmas that had already brought forth its fruit or effect were said not to exist, but those which had not yet brought forth a karmic effect could be said to have some efficacy. The Sarvāstivāda Vijñānakāya states their position as defended by Moggaliputtatissa as: "The past and future are not; the present and the unconditioned exist."

The Vibhajyavādins also held that out of all dharmas, only nirvāṇa was an unconditioned (asaṃskṛta) dharma, against the view of the Sarvāstivāda which also held that space was an unconditioned dharma. Another difference with the Sarvāstivāda hinged on the issue of gradual versus sudden attainment. The Vibhajyavādins held that at stream entry, understanding of the Four Noble Truths came at once (ekābhisamaya), while the Sarvāstivāda asserted that this happened only gradually (anupubbābhisamaya). Vibhajyavādins also asserted that arhats could not regress or fall back to a lower state once they attained arhatship. The Vibhajyavādins also rejected the doctrine of the intermediate state between rebirths (antarabhava).

Doctrines of the Vibhajyavādins can be seen in the Kathāvatthu, traditionally attributed to elder Moggalipputtatissa by the Theravāda. The earliest layer of this text could date as far as the reign of Ashoka. However, neither the Theravādin Kathāvatthu nor the Sarvāstivāda Vijñānakāya contain any reference to Vibhajyavāda as a separate school, indicating that perhaps during the time they were recorded there was not yet a formal schism between the Sarvāstivāda and the Vibhajyavāda.

The Visuddhimagga of Buddhaghosa, a fifth century Sri Lankan work meanwhile, mentions that the Visuddhimagga was written at the request of Sanghaphala, "a member of the lineage of the Mahāvihārasins, illustrious Theriyas, best of Vibhajjavādins".

== Branches ==
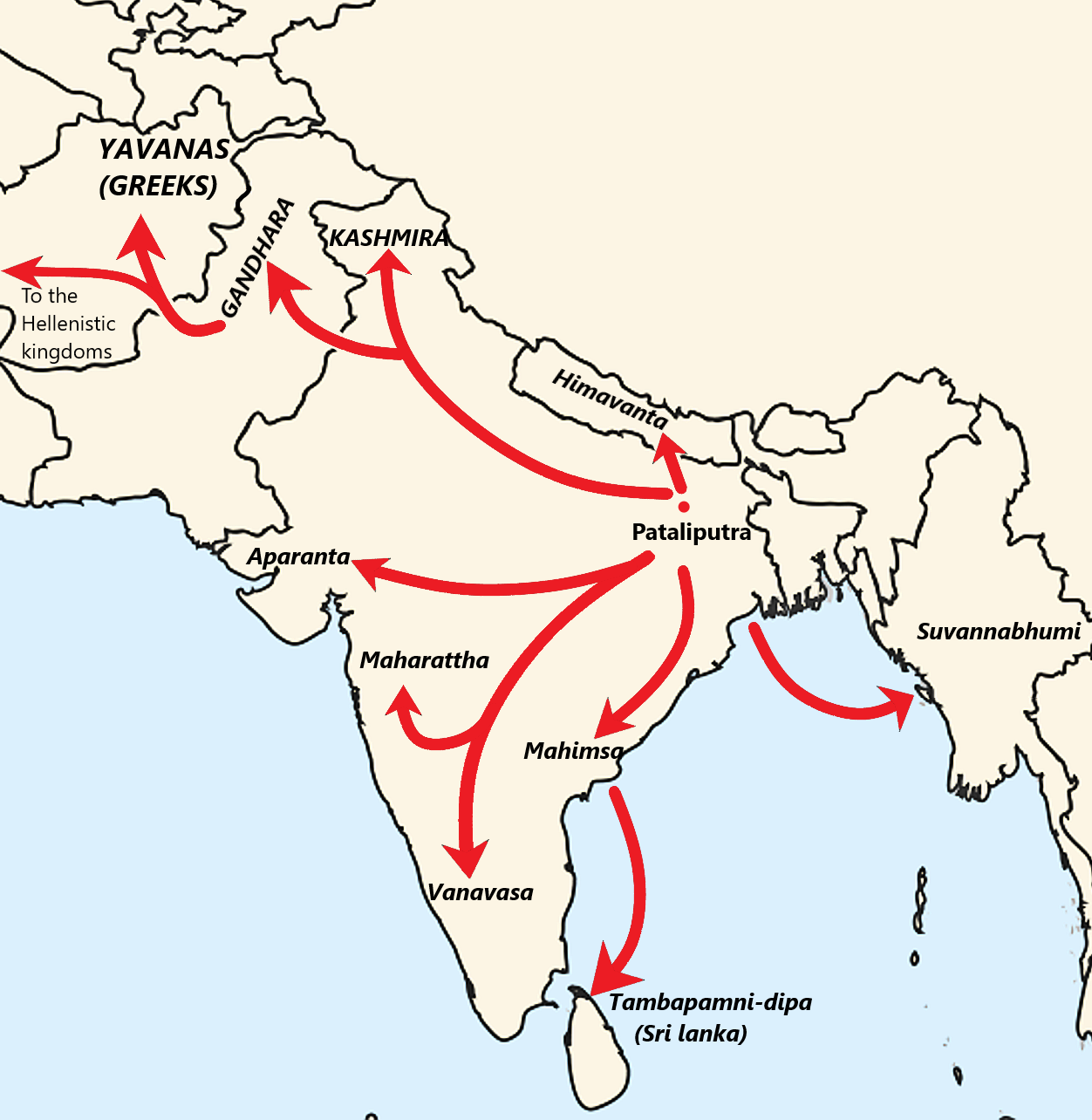
Map of the Buddhist missions during the reign of Ashoka.

The Vibhajyavādins are not recorded uniformly by early Buddhist traditions as being a distinct sect, nor being associated with any one period of time. Some scholars believe that there was no separate Vibhajyavāda sect, but that the term vibhajyavāda was sometimes affixed to the name of a school to indicate that it differed from the main school on some doctrines. In this sense, they would be vibhajyavādins of that particular school.

The name was applied to a variety of communities across the Indian subcontinent. The major ones were:

- Dharmaguptaka, located mainly in the northwest of the Indian subcontinent but also spreading along the Central Asian trade routes. According to Richard Salomon, this school was involved in missionary activity and was dominant in Gandhara during the first century CE.
- Kāśyapīya, probably located in the same area as the Dharmaguptaka.
- Mahīśāsaka, as above but also in other parts of mainland India.
- Tambapaṇṇiya (Skt. Tāmraparṇīya, later known as Mahāvihāravāsins and Theravāda), established in Sri Lanka (at Anuradhapura) but active also in Andhra and other parts of South India (Vanavasa in modern Karnataka) and later across Southeast Asia. Inscriptional evidence has been found in Amaravati and Nagarjunakonda.

Bhante Sujato, in his overview of Dharmaguptaka and Mahāvihāravāsin schools, argues that the split between them was not due to any difference in doctrine or monastic discipline, but due to geographical distance.

According to L. S. Cousins, the precursor to these schools was probably involved in missionary activity around the time of Ashoka into the regions of Kashmir, Gandhara, Bactria, Andhra and Sri Lanka. Cousins concludes:

Vibhajjavadins really were the school predominant in Ceylon and Gandhara at an early date, as well as being present, if not predominant, in other parts of Central Asia, China, South India and South-East Asia by around the third century CE at the latest. No other school had a comparable spread at this date.

== Sectarian views ==
The Mahāvihāra Theravādins of Sri Lanka are descendants of the Sthavira Vibhajyavādins in South India who used the Pali language, differing somewhat from the northern Sthavira schools. The Theravādins hold that Vibhajyavāda was the favored doctrine during a Buddhist council that took place in Pataliputra under Ashoka. As Gethin notes, the sources are rather confused on this matter however.

The Sammatīyas (aka Pudgalavādins) also mention the Vibhajyavādins. According to the Sammatīya sect, the Vibhajyavādins developed from the Sarvāstivāda school.

The Sarvāstivādin Abhidharma Mahāvibhāṣa Śāstra describes the Vibhajyavādins as being the type of heretics who "make objections, who uphold harmful doctrines and attack those who follow the authentic Dharma."

The Mahāsāṃghika saw the Vibhajyavādins as being offshoots from the root schism in Buddhism, which according to them produced three sects: the Sthaviras, the Mahāsāṃghikas, and the Vibhajyavādins. The Mahāsāṃghikas list the Mahīśāsaka, Dharmaguptaka, Kāśyapīya, and Tāmraparnīya (Theravāda) sects as having descended from the Vibhajyavādins. The Mahāsāṃghika branch itself, together with the Prajñaptivāda, preferred to be called Bahuśrutiya-Vibhajyavādins.

== See also ==
- Early Buddhist schools

== Sources ==
- Baruah, Bibhuti (2008), Buddhist Sects and Sectarianism.
- Berkwitz, Stephen C. (2012), South Asian Buddhism: A Survey, Routledge.
- Dutt, Nalinaksha (1998), Buddhist Sects in India.
- Harvey, Peter (1995), An Introduction to Buddhism, Cambridge University Press.
- Skilton, Andrew (2004), A Concise History of Buddhism.
- Sujato, Bhante (2012), Sects and Sectarianism: The Origins of Buddhist Schools, Santipada, ISBN 9781921842085
- Tripathi, Sridhar (2008), Encyclopaedia of Pali Literature.
- Warder, A. K. (2000), Indian Buddhism, Motilall Banarsidas.
