= Kukkuṭika =

School in Buddhism

The Kukkuṭika (Sanskrit; traditional Chinese: 雞胤部; ; pinyin: Jīyìn Bù) were an early Buddhist school which descended from the Mahāsāṃghika.

== Etymology ==
It is likely that the name Kukkuṭika or Kukkulika originated from the Kukkuṭrārāma monastery at Pāṭaliputra, which was an early centre for the Mahāsāṃghikas.

There were numerous variations of this name, such as Kukkuṭika, Kukkulika, Kaukkuṭika, Kaurukullaka, and Gokulika.

The name Gokulika means "cinder", and refers to the doctrine that all conditioned phenomena necessarily involve suffering, and that they are like an "inferno of ashes".

== Doctrines ==
The Samayabhedoparacanaćakra of Vasumitra regards the Ekavyāvahārika, Kukkuṭika, and Lokottaravāda as being doctrinally indistinguishable. According to Vasumitra, 48 theses were held in common by these three Mahāsāṃghika sects. Of these 48 special theses, 20 points concern the supramundane nature of buddhas and bodhisattvas. According to the Samayabhedoparacanacakra, these four groups held that the Buddha is able to know all dharmas in a single moment of the mind. Yao Zhihua writes:

In their view, the Buddha is equipped with the following supernatural qualities: transcendence (lokottara), lack of defilements, all of his utterances preaching his teaching, expounding all his teachings in a single utterance, all of his sayings being true, his physical body being limitless, his power (prabhāva) being limitless, the length of his life being limitless, never tiring of enlightening sentient beings and awakening pure faith in them, having no sleep or dreams, no pause in answering a question, and always in meditation (samādhi).

== History ==
The Kukkuṭika sect is believed to have split from the main Mahāsāṃghika sect during the reign of Aśoka utilising early Buddha chronology, and the late second century BCE utilising late Buddha chronology. The Bahuśrutīya and Prajñaptivāda are thought to have split from the Kukkuṭikas in the late third or second century BCE. The Kukkuṭikas seem to have remained in Eastern India, and remained strongest in the area around Vārāṇasī.

The sixth-century Indian monk Paramārtha associates the initial composition and acceptance of Mahāyāna sūtras with the Mahāsāṃghika branch of Buddhism. He wrote that the Mahāsāṃghikas initially split into three groups based upon the relative manner and degree to which they accepted the authority of Mahayana teachings. Paramārtha states that at this time, the Kukkuṭika sect did not accept the Mahāyāna sūtras as buddhavacana ("words of the Buddha"), while the Lokottaravāda sect and the Ekavyāvahārika sect did accept the Mahāyāna sūtras as buddhavacana.

In the early fifth century, the Chinese monk Faxian procured a copy of the Mahāsāṃghika Vinaya from a monastery in Pāṭaliputra that he describes as "Mahāyāna". The Kukkuṭikas were a Mahāsāṃghika sect known to exist in Pāṭaliputra, even having alternate names linking them to the Kukkuṭrārāma monastery there.

According to Tāranātha, this school disappeared between the fourth and ninth centuries. In his eighth-century account of the various contemporary Buddhist sects, Vinitadeva does not mention Kukkuṭika. It is possible that this sect had merged completely into Mahāyāna Buddhism by this time.

== See also ==
- Schools of Buddhism
