= Caitika =

Early Buddhist school

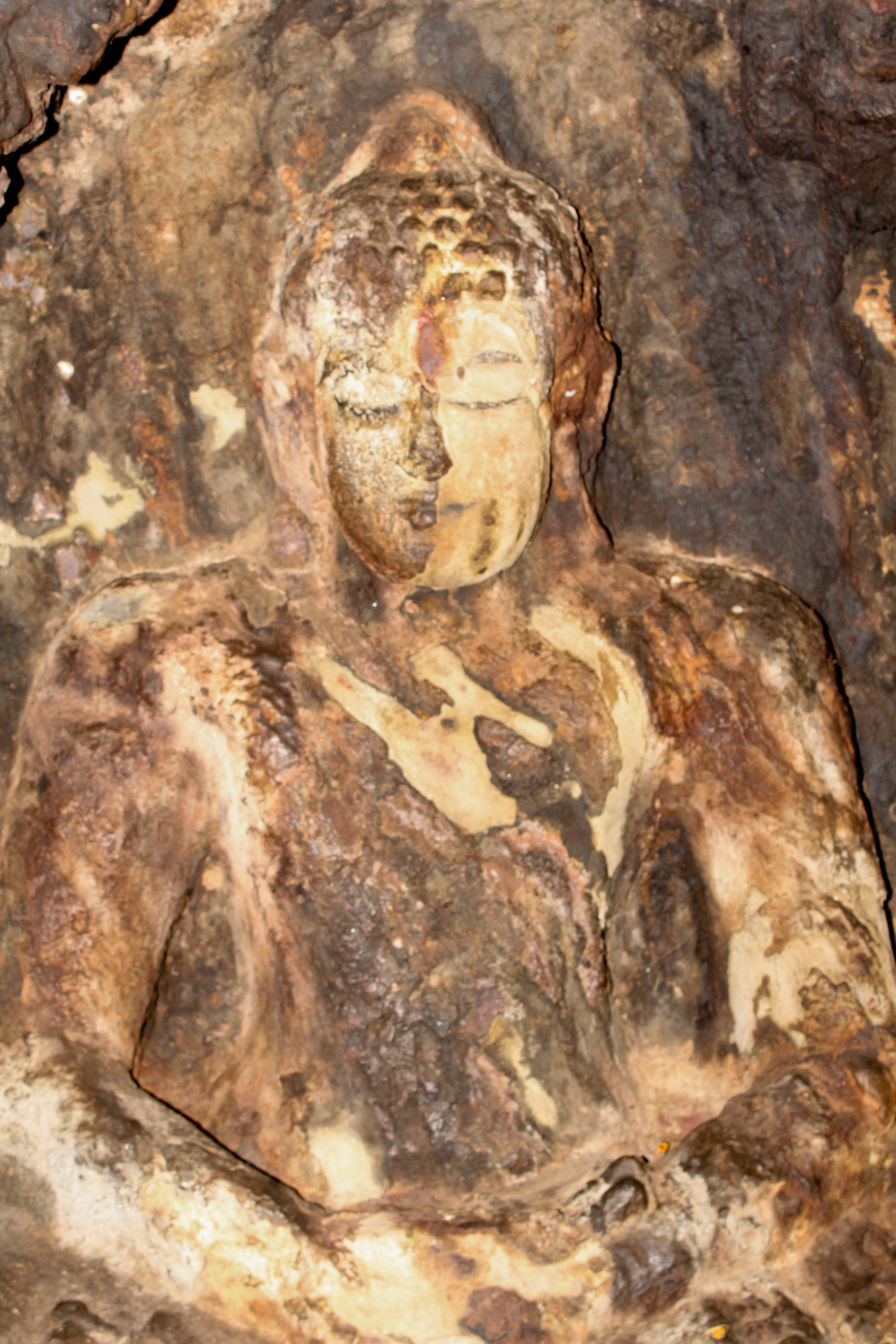
Statue of the Buddha at Bojjannakonda, Andhra Pradesh

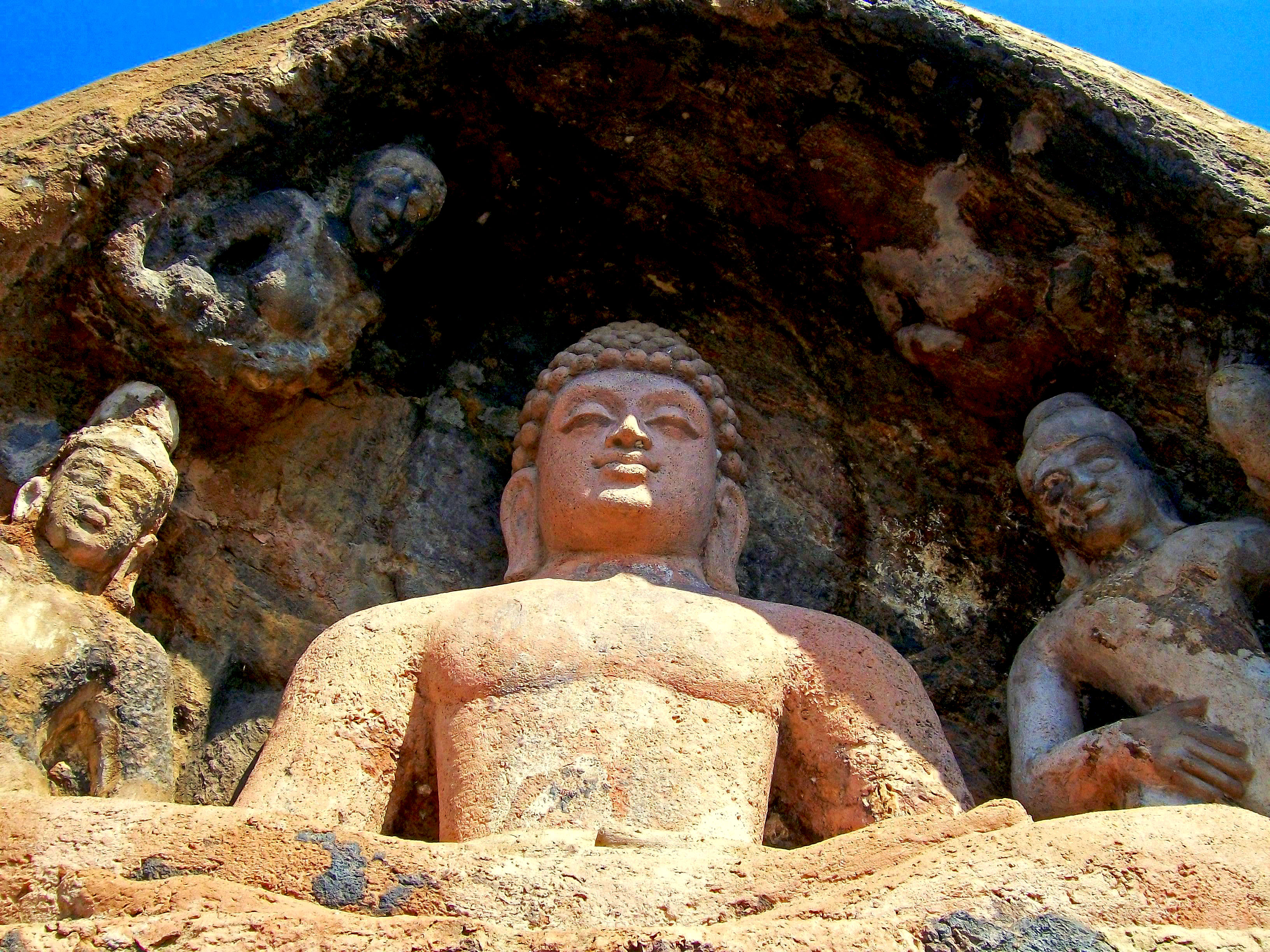
Statue of the Buddha at Bojjannakonda, Andhra Pradesh

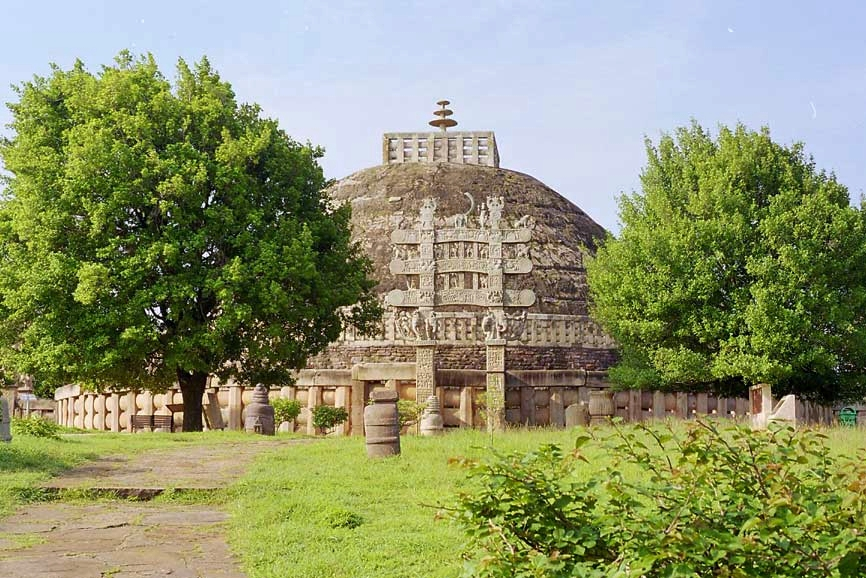
The Great Stupa at Sanchi associated with the Caitikas.

The Caitika (Chinese: 制多山部 or 制多部) was an early Buddhist school, a sub-sect of the Mahāsāṃghika. They were also known as the Caityaka sect.

The Caitikas proliferated throughout the mountains of South India, from which they derived their name. In Pali writings, members of this sect and its offshoots were generally referred to as the Andhakas, meaning "of Coastal Andhra".

== History ==
The Caitikas branched off from the main Mahāsāṃghika school in the 1st or 2nd century BCE. Epigraphic evidence of the Mahāsāṃghikas in the Mathura region dates to the first century BCE, and the Śāriputraparipṛcchā Sūtra dates the formation of the Caitikas to 300 years after the Buddha. However, the ancient Buddhist sites in the lower Kṛṣṇa Valley, including Amarāvati Stupa, Nāgārjunakoṇḍā and Jaggayyapeṭa "can be traced to at least the third century BCE, if not earlier."

The Caitikas gave rise to the Aparaśailas and Uttaraśailas (also called Pūrvaśailas). Together, they comprised an important part of the Mahāsāṃghika located in South India. Two other sub-sects associated with the Caitikas include the Rājagirikas and the Siddhārthikas, both of which emerged from the Andhra region around 300 CE.

The Caitikas are said to have had in their possession the Great Stupa at Sanchi. The Great Stūpa was first commissioned by Asoka in the 3rd century BCE and became known as a Buddhist pilgrimage site. In the Ajaṇṭā Caves, the only epigraphic reference to an early Buddhist sect is to that of the Caitikas, which is associated with an iconic image in Cave 10. The Mahāsāṃghikas were generally associated with the early veneration of anthropomorphic Buddha images.

When Xuanzang visited Dhānyakaṭaka, he wrote that the monks of this region were Mahāsāṃghikas, and mentions the Pūrvaśailas specifically. Near Dhānyakaṭaka, he met two Mahāsāṃghika bhikṣus and studied Mahāsāṃghika Abhidharma with them for several months, during which time they also studied various Mahāyāna śāstras together under Xuanzang's direction.

== Doctrine ==
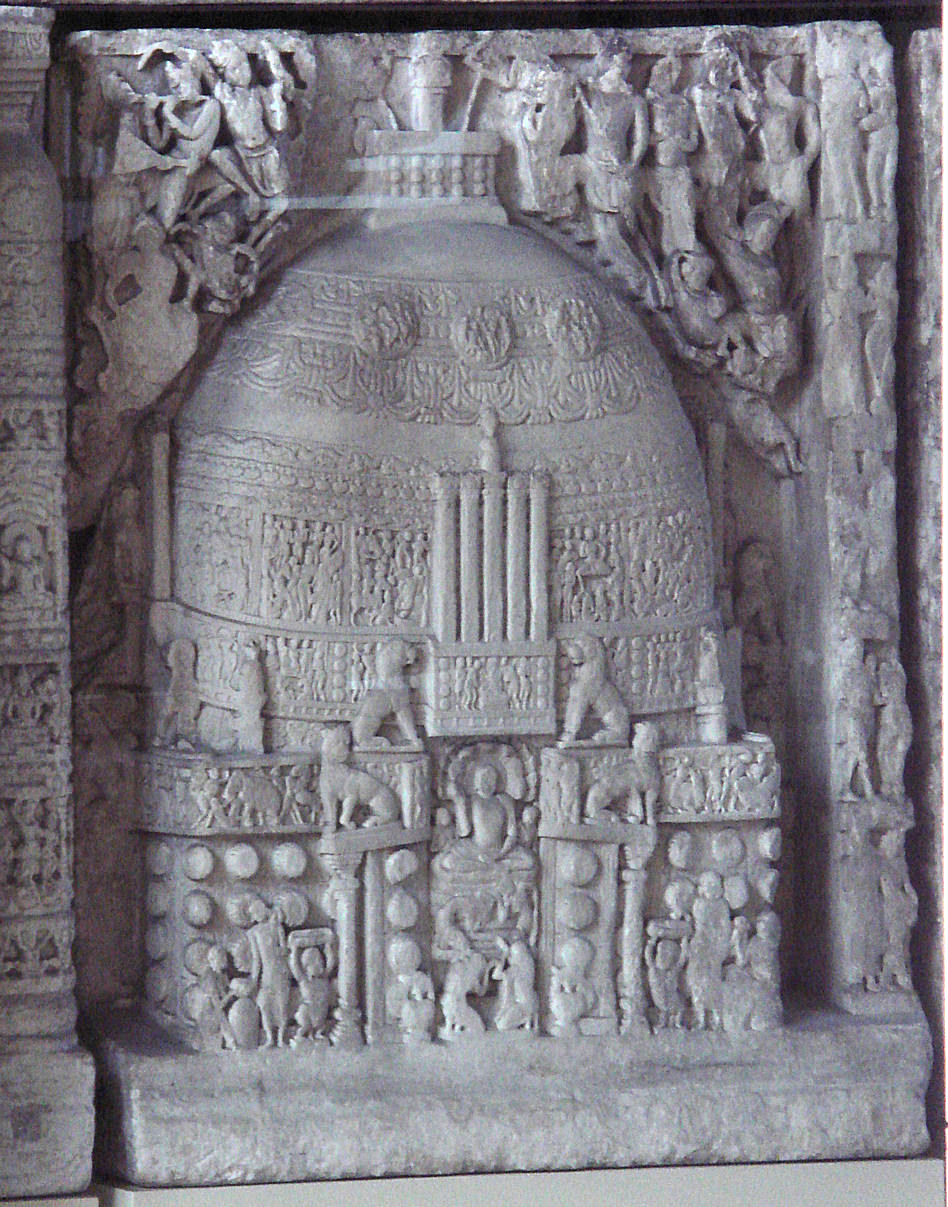
Drum-slab from the Amaravati Stupa

The southern Mahāsāṃghika schools such as the Caitikas advocated the ideal of the bodhisattva, the bodhisattvayāna, over that of the arhat or śrāvakayāna, and they viewed arhats as being fallible and still subject to ignorance. The main Caitika school, along with the Aparaśailas and Uttaraśailas, all emphasised the transcendent and supramundane character of the Buddha.

Xuanzang considered the Mahāsāṃghika doctrine of a mūlavijñāna ("root consciousness") to be essentially the same as the Yogāćāra doctrine of the ālāyavijñāna "storehouse consciousness". He also noted that the doctrine of the mūlavijñāna was contained in the Āgama of the Mahāsāṃghikas.

== Relationship to Mahāyāna ==
=== Associations ===
A. K. Warder holds that the Mahāyāna "almost certainly" first developed from the southern Mahāsāṃghika schools of the Āndhra region, among monastic communities associated with the Caitikas and their sub-sects.

Anthony Barber and Sree Padma note that "historians of Buddhist thought have been aware for quite some time that such pivotally important Mahayana Buddhist thinkers as Nāgārjuna, Dignāga, Ćandrakīrti, Āryadeva, and Bhāviveka, among many others, formulated their theories while living in Buddhist communities in Āndhra."

=== Royal patronage ===
Some early Mahāyāna sūtras reference wealthy female donors and provide evidence that they were developed in the Āndhra region, where the Caitika were predominant. The Mahāyāna Mahāmegha Sūtra, for example, gives a prophecy about a royal princess of the Śatavāhana dynasty who will live in Āndhra, along the Kṛṣṇa River, in Dhānyakaṭaka, seven hundred years after the parinirvāṇa of the Buddha.

Several scholars such as Étienne Lamotte, and Alex and Hideko Wayman, associate the Āndhra Ikṣvāku dynasty with patronage of Mahāyāna sūtras. Epigraphic evidence at Nāgārjunikoṇḍa also provides abundant evidence of royal and wealthy female donors.

=== Prajñāpāramitā ===
A number of scholars have proposed that the Mahāyāna Prajñāpāramitā teachings were first developed by the Caitika subsect of the Mahāsāṃghikas. They believe that the Aṣṭasāhasrikā Prajñāpāramitā Sūtra originated amongst the southern Mahāsāṃghika schools of the Āndhra region, along the Kṛṣṇa River. Guang Xing states, "Several scholars have suggested that the Prajñāpāramitā probably developed among the Mahāsāṃghikas in Southern India, in the Āndhra country, on the Kṛṣṇa River." These Mahāsāṃghikas had two famous monasteries near the Amarāvati and the Dhānyakaṭaka, which gave their names to the schools of the Pūrvaśailas and the Aparaśailas. Each of these schools had a copy of the Aṣṭasāhasrikā Prajñāpāramitā Sūtra in Prakrit. Guang Xing also assesses the view of the Buddha given in the Aṣṭasāhasrikā Prajñāpāramitā Sūtra as being that of the Mahāsāṃghikas. Edward Conze estimates that this Sūtra originated around 100 BCE.

=== Tathāgatagarbha ===
Brian Edward Brown, a specialist in Tathāgatagarbha doctrines, writes that it has been determined that the composition of the Śrīmālādevī Siṃhanāda Sūtra occurred during the Āndhra Ikṣvāku dynasty in the 3rd century CE as a product of the Mahāsāṃghikas of the Āndhra region (i.e. the Caitika schools). Alex Wayman has outlined eleven points of complete agreement between the Mahāsāṃghikas and the Śrīmālādevī Siṃhanāda Sūtra, along with four major arguments for this association. After its composition, this text became the primary scriptural advocate in India for the universal potentiality of Buddhahood. Anthony Barber also associates the earlier development of the Tathāgatagarbha Sūtra with the Mahāsāṃghikas, and concludes that the Mahāsāṃghikas of the Āndhra region were responsible for the inception of the Tathāgatagarbha doctrine.

=== Bodhisattva canons ===
In the 6th century CE, Bhāviveka speaks of the Siddhārthikas using a Vidyādhāra Piṭaka, and the Aparaśailas and Uttaraśailas (Pūrvaśailas) both using a Bodhisattva Piṭaka, implying collections of Mahāyāna texts within these Caitika schools. During the same period, Avalokitavrata speaks of the Mahāsāṃghikas using a Great Āgama Piṭaka, which is then associated with Mahāyāna sūtras such as the Prajñāparamitā and the Ten Stages Sūtra. Avalokitavrata also states that Mahāyāna sūtras such as the Prajñāparamitā were recited by the Aparaśailas and the Pūrvaśailas.

According to the Theravādin text Nikāyasaṅgraha, the large Mahāyāna collection called the Mahāratnakūṭa Sūtra (Taishō Tripiṭaka No. 310) was composed by the "Andhakas", meaning the Caitika schools of the Āndhra region. This collection includes the Śrīmālādevī Siṃhanāda Sūtra, the Longer Sukhāvatīvyūha Sūtra, the Akṣobhyavyūha Sūtra, a long text called the Bodhisattva Piṭaka, and others. The Mahāratnakūṭa collection totals 49 Mahāyāna sūtras, divided into 120 fascicles in the Chinese translation.

== Disputes with Theravāda ==
In the Mahāvihāra tradition of the Theravāda school, Buddhaghoṣa grouped the Caitika schools in the Āndhra region, such as the Rājagirikas and the Siddhārthikas, as the "Andhakas". Works such as the Kathāvatthu show that Mahāvihāra polemics were directed overwhelmingly at these "Andhakas" in India.

=== Textual authenticity ===
The Caitika schools rejected the post-Asokan texts that were in use by the Anuradhapura Maha Viharaya tradition such as the Parivāra, the six books of Abhidharma, the Paṭisambhidāmagga, the Niddesa, some Jātakas, some Gāthās, and so on. For example, the Caitikas claimed that their own Jātakas represented the original collection before the Buddhist tradition split into various lineages.

=== Interpretation of Buddhist texts ===
One dispute recorded in the Kathāvatthu between the Mahāvihāravasins and the Andhakas was a fundamental matter concerning the interpretation of the Buddha's teachings. The Andhakas are said to have held that the Buddha's actions and speech were supramundane, but some may only perceive the conventional or mundane interpretation. For the Mahāsāṃghika branch of Buddhism, the ultimate meaning of the Buddha's teachings was "beyond words", and words were merely a conventional exposition of the Dharma. The Theravāda Mahāvihāravasins, in contrast, argued that literal interpretations of the Buddha's teachings were best.

== See also ==
- Index of Buddhism-related articles
- Nikāya Buddhism
- Schools of Buddhism
- Secular Buddhism
