= Kāśyapīya =

Buddhist school in India

The Kāśyapīya (Sanskrit: काश्यपीय; Pali: Kassapiyā or Kassapikā; traditional Chinese: 飲光部; ; pinyin: Yǐnguāng Bù; Vietnamese: Ẩm Quang đệ tử bộ, Ca-diếp-di bộ) was one of the early Buddhist schools in India.

== Etymology ==
The name Kāśyapīya is believed to be derived from Kāśyapa, one of the original missionaries sent by King Ashoka to the Himavant country. The Kāśyapīyas were also called the Haimavatas.

== History ==
The Kāśyapīyas are believed to have become an independent school c. 190 BCE. According to the Theravādin Mahāvaṃsa, the Kāśyapīya were an offshoot of the Sarvāstivāda. However, according to the Mahāsāṃghika account, the Kāśyapīya sect descended from the Vibhajyavādins.

Xuanzang and Yijing note small fragments of the Kāśyapīya sect still in existence around the 7th century, suggesting that much of the sect may have adopted the Mahāyāna teachings by this time.

In the 7th century CE, Yijing grouped the Mahīśāsaka, Dharmaguptaka, and Kāśyapīya together as sub-sects of the Sarvāstivāda, and stated that these three groups were not prevalent in the "five parts of India," but were located in the some parts of Oḍḍiyāna, Khotan, and Kucha.

== Appearance ==
Between 148 and 170 CE, the Parthian monk An Shigao came to China and translated a work which describes the color of monastic robes (Skt. kāṣāya) utilised in five major Indian Buddhist sects, called Da Biqiu Sanqian Weiyi (Ch. 大比丘三千威儀). Another text translated at a later date, the Śāriputraparipṛcchā, contains a very similar passage corroborating this information. In both sources, members of the Kāśyapīya sect are described as wearing magnolia robes. The relevant portion of the Mahāsāṃghika Śāriputraparipṛcchā reads: "The Kāśyapīya school are diligent and energetic in guarding sentient beings. They wear magnolia robes."

== Doctrines ==
In Vasumitra's history Samayabhedoparacanaćakra, the Haimavatas (Kāśyapīyas) are described as an eclectic school upholding doctrines of both the Sthaviras and the Mahāsāṃghikas.

According to the Kathāvatthu commentary, the Kāśyapīyas believed that past events exist in the present in some form.

According to A. K. Warder, the Kāśyapīya school held the doctrine that arhats were fallible and imperfect, similar to the view of the Sarvāstivādins and the various Mahāsāṃghika sects. They held that arhats have not fully eliminated desires, that their "perfection" is incomplete, and that it is possible for them to relapse.

== Texts ==
Some tentatively attribute the Gāndhārī Dharmapada to the Kāśyapīya school.

An incomplete translation of the Saṃyukta Āgama (T. 100) that is in the Chinese Buddhist canon is believed to be that of the Kāśyapīya sect. This text is different from the complete version of the Saṃyukta Āgama (T. 99), which stems from a Mūlasarvāstivāda transmission lineage. However, Bingenheimer, who has specialized on T 100, rejects its widespread attribution to the Kāśyapīya school.

== Sources ==
- Brough, John (2001). The Gāndhārī Dharmapada. Delhi: Motilal Banarsidass Publishers Private Limited.
- Geiger, Wilhelm (trans.), assisted by Mabel H. Bode (1912). The Great Chronicle of Ceylon. Pali Text Society. ISBN 0-86013-001-0. Retrieved 27 Nov 2008 from "Lakdiva" at http://lakdiva.org/mahavamsa/.
- Malalasekera, G. P. (2003). Dictionary of Pali Proper Names. Asian Educational Services. ISBN 81-206-1823-8.
- Warder, A. K. (1970/2004). Indian Buddhism. Delhi: Motilal Banarsidass. ISBN 81-208-1741-9.
