= Teaching of the Elders =

Teaching of the Elders may refer to:

- Sthaviravada
- Theravada
- Elder (Christianity)
