= Prajñaptivāda =

Early Buddhist school in India

The Prajñaptivāda (Sanskrit; traditional Chinese: 說假部; ; pinyin: Shuō Jiǎ Bù) was a branch of the Mahāsāṃghika, one of the early Buddhist schools in India. The Prajñaptivādins were also known as the Bahuśrutīya-Vibhajyavādins.

== History ==
According to Vasumitra, the Prajñaptivāda school is said to have developed as one of several Mahāsāṃghika subschools. They are recorded as having taken up residence in the Himalayas. According to Tāranātha, the Prajñaptivādins continued to flourish in Magadha through the Pala Empire as late as the 10th century. A. K. Warder writes that the Prajñaptivādins were not known to have left Buddhism's original territory (modern Northeast India, Bengal and Nepal).

== Doctrines and teachings ==
The Samayabhedhoparacanaćakra records that the doctrines of the Prajñaptivāda school were similar to those of the main Mahāsāṃghika school.

=== Prajñapti ===
According to André Bareau, the name Prajñaptivāda refers to their doctrine that phenomena are the product of conceptualisation (Skt. prajñapti). The Prajñaptivādins distinguished between conventional truth (Skt. saṃvṛti) and ultimate truth (Skt. paramārtha), and between reality (Skt. tattva) and mere concepts (Skt. prajñapti).

Vasumitra writes that the Prajñaptivādins viewed all conditioned phenomena as being mere concepts or notions (Skt. prajñapti), and therefore they were considered to be suffering. Contrary to the Sarvāstivādins, the Prajñaptivādins did not view the skandhas or the five elements as suffering. Instead these were viewed as existing merely as nominal entities without any ultimate existence.

=== Merit and karma ===
The Prajñaptivādins believed that the Noble Path is eternal and immutable, and that it is not possible for it to be lost or destroyed. They also held that the path was not something that could be cultivated through contemplation. However, they believed that the path could be attained through all-knowledge (Skt. sarvajñāna) and the accumulation of merit. Whether one meets an untimely death or attains the Noble Path, the Prajñaptivādins viewed all such outcomes as being the result of merit and karma.

=== Spoken teachings ===
The Prajñaptivādins held that the Buddha's teachings in the various Piṭakas were nominal (Skt. prajñapti), conventional (Skt. saṃvṛti), and causal (Skt. hetuphala). Therefore, all teachings were viewed by the Prajñaptivādins as being of provisional importance, since they cannot contain the ultimate truth. It has been observed that this view of the Buddha's teachings is very close to the fully developed position of the Mahāyāna sūtras.

== Relationship to Mahāyāna ==
=== Theories ===
André Bareau considers the origin of the Mahāyāna tradition to be in the early Mahāsāṃghika schools, and cites the Bahuśrutīyas and Prajñaptivādins as sub-sects of the Mahāsāṃghika that may have played an important role in bridging the flow of Mahāyāna teachings between the northern and southern Mahāsāṃghika traditions.

=== Two truths doctrine ===
The Prajñaptivādins were early articulators of the two truths doctrine that is so important to the Mahāyāna, where it is usually found in the relationship between skillful means (Skt. upāya) and wisdom (Skt. prajñā). Ian Charles Harris has noted that the doctrines of the Prajñaptivāda school are indeed similar to the early Mahāyāna view of the two truths.

There is also evidence that the Prajñaptivādins were an influence on Nāgārjuna, who is also among the storied promulgators of the two truths doctrine (using some of the same technical terms), and who in his Mūlamadhyamakakārikā only cites one text by name, that being the Kātyāyana Gotra Sūtra, of which the Prajñaptivādins were known to be fond.

== See also ==
- Schools of Buddhism
- Early Buddhist schools
- Nikāya Buddhism
