= Early Buddhist schools =

Early Buddhist monastic schools

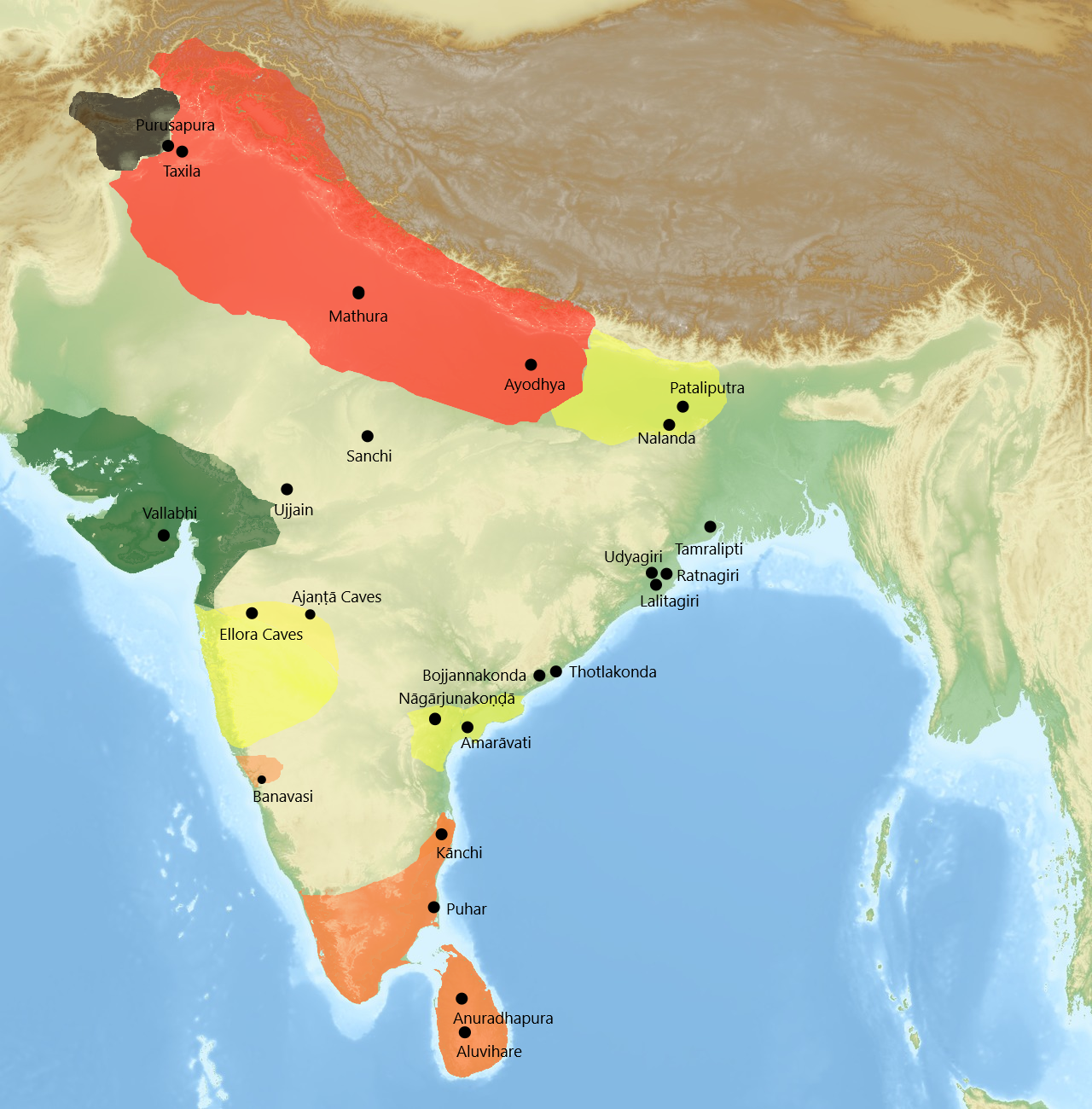
Map of the geographical centers of the major Buddhist schools in South Asia, at around the time of Xuanzang's visit in the seventh century. · Gray: Dharmaguptakas · Red: Sarvāstivādins · Yellow: Mahāsāṃghikas · Green: Pudgalavādins · Orange: Vibhajyavādins

The early Buddhist schools refers to the Indian Buddhist "doctrinal schools" or "schools of thought" (Sanskrit: vāda) which arose out of the early unified Buddhist monastic community (Saṅgha) due to various schisms in the history of Indian Buddhism. The various splits and divisions were caused by differences in interpretations of the monastic rule (Vinaya), doctrinal differences and also due to simple geographical separation as Buddhism spread throughout the Indian subcontinent.

The early Buddhist community initially split into two main Nikāyas (monastic groups, divisions): the Sthavira ("Elders"), and the Mahāsāṃghika ("Great Community"). This initial split occurred either during the reign of Aśoka (c. 268-232 BCE) or shortly after (historians disagree on the matter).

Later, these groups became further divided on doctrinal grounds into numerous schools of thought and practice (each with their own monastic rules and doctrinal Abhidharma texts). Some of the main sects included the Sarvāstivādins ("Temporal Eternalists"), the Dharmaguptakas ("Preservers of Dharma"), Lokottaravādins ("Transcendentalists"), the Prajñaptivādins ("Conceptualists"), the Vibhajyavādins ("Analysts"), and the Pudgalavādins ("Personalists"). According to traditional accounts these sects eventually proliferated into 18 (or, less-commonly, 20) different schools.

The textual material shared by the early schools is often termed the early Buddhist texts and these are an important source for understanding their doctrinal similarities and differences. There were various works of Abhidharma and other treatises written by these schools that contain more unique doctrines specific to each school.

== Formation and development ==
=== The First Council ===
According to the scriptures (Cullavagga XI.1 ff), three months after the parinirvāṇa of Gautama Buddha, some of the arahants among his disciples held a council—presided over by Mahākāśyapa, one of the most senior disciples—at Rajagaha (Rajgir), with the support of king Ajātasattu, and there recited the teachings of the Buddha. The scriptures of the various schools differ, in their accounts of the council, as to what was actually recited there. An elder monk named Purāṇa is recorded as having said: "Your reverences, well-chanted by the elders are the Dhamma and Vinaya, but in that way that I heard it in the Lord's presence, that I received it in his presence, in that same way will I bear it in mind."; this is taken by Paul Williams to suggest some disagreement about the accuracy of the canon even at that time. According to Theravāda tradition, the teachings were divided into various parts and each was assigned to an elder and his pupils to commit to memory, and there was no conflict about what the Buddha taught.

Some scholars argue that the First Council did not actually take place.

=== Divergence between the Sthavira and the Mahāsāṃghika ===
The expansion of orally transmitted texts in early Buddhism, and the growing distances between Buddhist communities, fostered specialisation and sectarian identification. One or several disputes did occur during Aśoka's reign, involving both doctrinal and disciplinary (Vinaya) matters, although these may have been too informal to be called a "council". The Sthavira school had, by the time of Aśoka, divided into three sub-schools, doctrinally speaking, but these did not become separate monastic orders until later.

In Theravādin tradition, the first schism's precipitating dispute is supposed to have occurred during the Second Council at Vaishali, approximately one hundred years after Gautama Buddha's parinirvāṇa; the result of the council was—according to this tradition—the first schism in the Saṅgha, between the Sthavira and the Mahāsāṃghika, though the exact cause of the split is not well agreed-upon. While the Second Council probably was an historical event, details regarding its course and outcome are less certain.

Lamotte and Hirakawa both maintain that the first schism in the Buddhist Saṅgha occurred during the reign of Aśoka; Collett Cox places the date slightly later, writing that "most scholars would agree that even though the roots of the earliest recognised groups predate Aśoka, their actual separation did not occur until after his death." Only two ancient sources (the Dīpavaṃsa and Bhāviveka's third list) place the first schism before Aśoka, and only one (the Mahāsāṃghika Śāriputraparipṛcchā) attributes it to a dispute on Vinaya; several (especially Sthaviravādin) sources give the cause as a dispute over doctrine.

The various splits within the monastic organizations went together with the introduction and emphasis on Abhidharmic literature by some schools. This literature was specific to each school, and arguments and disputes between the schools were often based upon these Abhidharmic writings. However, modern scholars generally hold the first schisms to have been based upon disagreements on Vinaya (monastic discipline), though it is also asserted that—by c. 100 CE or earlier—they could be based upon doctrinal disagreement. Pre-sectarian Buddhism, however, did not have Abhidharmic scriptures, except perhaps for a basic framework, and not all of the early schools developed an Abhidharma literature.

=== Third Council under Aśoka ===
Theravādin sources state that, in the 3rd century BCE, a council was convened under the patronage of Aśoka. Some scholars argue that there are certain implausible features of the Theravādin account which imply that the Third Council was ahistorical. The remainder consider it a purely Theravāda-Vibhajyavāda council.

According to the Theravādin account, this council was convened primarily for the purpose of establishing an official orthodoxy. At the council, small groups raised questions about the specifics of the Vinaya and the interpretation of doctrine. The chairman of the council, Moggaliputta Tissa, compiled a book, the Kathāvatthu, which was meant to refute these arguments. The council sided with Moggaliputta and his version of Buddhism as orthodox; it was then adopted by Emperor Aśoka as his empire's official religion. In Pali, this school of thought was termed Vibhajjavāda, literally "thesis of [those who make] a distinction".

The distinction involved was as to the existence of dharmas in the past, future, and present. The version of the scriptures that had been established at the Third Council—including the Vinaya, Sūtra, and Abhidharma Piṭakas (collectively known as the Tripiṭaka)—was taken to Sri Lanka by Emperor Aśoka's son, the monk Mahinda. There it was eventually committed to writing in the Pali language. The Pali Canon remains the most complete set of surviving Nikāya scriptures, although the greater part of the Sarvāstivādin canon also survives in Chinese translation (along with parts of other—sometimes unidentified—canons); some parts exist in Tibetan translations; and some fragments exist in Sanskrit manuscripts, and in some other Indo-Aryan languages (e.g., Gāndhārī).

=== Further divisions ===
Some time after the reign of Aśoka, further divisions began to occur within the Buddhist movement, and a number of additional schools emerged. Étienne Lamotte divided the mainstream Buddhist schools into three primary doctrinal types:

1. The "personalists", such as the Pudgalavādin Vātsīputrīyas and Saṃmittīyas.
2. The "realists"; namely, the Theravāda and Sarvāstivāda Ābhidharmikas.
3. The "nominalists"; e.g., the Mahāsāṃghika Prajñaptivādins, and possibly non-Abhidharma Sthaviravādins.

One Sthavira faction—based (in part) in Sri Lanka, and in certain areas of South India (such as Vanavasi in the southwest and the Kañci region in the southeast)—began to call themselves the Vibhajyavādins; this group later ceased to refer to themselves specifically as "Vibhajjavādins", but reverted to calling themselves "Theriyas", after the earlier Theras (Sthaviryas). Still later, at some point prior to the Dīpavaṃsa (4th century), the Pali name Theravāda was adopted and has remained in use ever since for this group.

Other groups included the Sarvāstivāda, the Dharmaguptakas, the Saṃmitīya, and the Pudgalavādins. The Pudgalavādins were also known as Vātsīputrīyas, after their putative founder. Later, this group became known as the Saṃmitīya school, after one of its subdivisions. It died out around the 9th or 10th century. Nevertheless, during most of the early medieval period, the Saṃmitīya school was numerically the largest Buddhist group in India, with more followers than all the other schools combined. The Sarvāstivādin school was most prominent in the Northwest India, and provided some of the doctrines that would later be adopted by the Mahāyāna. A related group was the Sautrāntika school, which only recognised the authority of the sūtras, and which rejected the Abhidharma transmitted and taught by the Vaibhāṣika wing of the Sarvāstivāda. Based on textual considerations, it has been suggested that the Sautrāntikas were actually adherents of Mūlasarvāstivāda. The relation between the Sarvāstivāda and the Mūlasarvāstivāda, however, is unclear.

All of these early schools of Nikāya Buddhism eventually came to be known collectively as "the eighteen schools" in later sources. With the exception of the Theravāda—and, in Tibet alone, the Mūlasarvāstivāda—none of these early schools survived beyond the late medieval period (by which time, several were long-extinct already); however, a considerable amount of the canonical literature of some of these schools has survived, mainly in Chinese translation. Moreover, the origins of specifically Mahāyāna doctrines may be discerned in the teachings of some of these early schools; in particular, those of the Mahāsāṃghika and the Sarvāstivāda.

The schools sometimes split over differences concerning the "real" meaning of teachings in the Sūtra Piṭaka, and sometimes over disagreement concerning the proper observance of Vinaya. These differences became embedded in large works such as the Abhidharmas and commentaries. Comparison of existing versions of the Sūtra Piṭakas of various sects shows evidence that doctrines from the Abhidharmas sometimes found their way back into the Sūtra Piṭakas to support the statements made in those Abhidharmas.

Some of these developments may be seen as later elaborations on the teachings. According to Gombrich, unintentional literalism was a major force for change in the early doctrinal history of Buddhism; i.e., texts were interpreted according to a strict literal reading of the words used therein, with little consideration paid to other hermeneutic techniques. (Note: Gombrich 1997, pp. 21–22: "I would also argue that unintentional literalism has been a major force for change in the early doctrinal history of Buddhism. Texts have been interpreted with too much attention to the precise words used and not enough to the speaker's intention, the spirit of the text. In particular I see in some doctrinal developments what I call scholastic literalism, which is a tendency to take the words and phrases of earlier texts (maybe the Buddha's own words) in such a way as to read in distinctions which it was never intended to make.")

== The eighteen schools ==
The Eighteen Schools
The Śāriputraparipṛcchā ("Questions of Śāriputra") is a Mahāsāṃghikan history, which gives the following list:

- Sthaviravāda
  - Sarvāstivāda
    - Mahīśāsaka
    - Dharmaguptaka
    - Suvarsa
  - Vātsīputrīya
    - Dharmottarīya
    - Bhadrayaniya
    - Sammatiya
    - Sannagarika
  - Kāśyapīya
  - Sūtravāda
  - Samkrantika
- Mahāsāṃghika
  - Vyavahāra
  - Lokottaravāda
  - Gokulika
  - Bahuśrutīya
  - Prajñaptivāda
  - Mahādeva
  - Caitika
  - Uttarashaila

The Samayabhedo Paracana Ćakra, composed by the Sarvāstivādin monk Vasumitra (d. 124 BCE) gives the following list:

- Sthaviravāda
  - Haimavata – First schism; referred to by Sarvāstivādins as "the original Sthavira School", but this school was only influential in the north of India.
  - Sarvāstivāda – First schism
    - Vātsīputrīya – Second schism
      - Dharmottarīya – Third schism
      - Bhadrayānīya – Third schism
      - Saṃmitīya – Third schism
      - Sannāgarika – Third schism
    - Mahīśāsaka– Fourth schism
      - Dharmaguptaka – Fifth schism
    - Kāśyapīya – Sixth schism
    - Sautrāntika – Seventh schism
- Mahāsāṃghika
  - Ekavyahārika – First schism
  - Lokottaravāda – First schism
  - Gokulika – First schism
  - Bahuśrutīya – Second schism
  - Prajñaptivāda – Third schism
  - Caitika – Fourth schism
  - Apara Śaila – Fourth schism
  - Uttara Śaila – Fourth schism

The Sri Lankan chronicles, Dīpavaṃsa (3rd–4th century CE) and Mahāvaṃsa (5th century CE), discern the following schools:

- Sthaviravāda/Vibhajjavāda/Theravāda
  - Mahīśāsaka – First schism
    - Sarvāstivāda – Third schism
      - Kāśyapīya – Fourth schism
        - Sankrantika – Fifth schism
          - Sautrāntika – Sixth schism
    - Dharmaguptaka – Third schism
  - Vātsīputrīya – First schism
    - Dharmottarīya – Second schism
    - Bhadrayānīya – Second schism
    - Sannāgarika – Second schism
    - Saṃmitīya – Second schism
- Mahāsāṃghika
  - Gokulika – First schism
    - Prajñaptivāda – Second schism
    - Bahuśrutīya – Second schism
  - Ekavyahārika – First schism
  - Caitika – Third schism, according to Dīpavaṃsa, but in the Mahāvaṃsa it is said to have arisen from the Pannati and Bahussutaka.

In addition, the Dīpavaṃsa lists the following six schools without identifying the schools from which they arose:

- Hemavatika (Sanskrit: Haimavata)
- Rajagiriya
- Siddhatthaka
- Pubbaseliya
- Aparaseliya (Sanskrit: Aparaśaila)
- Apararajagirika
Vinitadeva (c. 645–715), a Mūlasarvāstivādin monk, gives the following list:

- Sthaviravāda
  - Jetavaniya
  - Abhayagirivasa
  - Mahaviharavasa
- Sammatiya
  - Kaurukullaka
  - Avantaka
  - Vātsīputrīya
- Sarvāstivādia
  - Mūlasarvāstivāda
  - Kasyapiya
  - Mahīśāsaka
  - Dharmaguptaka
  - Bahuśrutīya
  - Tāmraśāṭīya
  - Vibhajyavāda
- Mahāsāṃghika
  - Purvasaila
  - Aparasaila
  - Haimavata
  - Lottaravādin
  - Prajñaptivāda

Twenty schools according to Mahāyāna scriptures in Chinese:

- Sthaviravāda, later Haimavata (Note: Sarvāstivāda (説一切有部), Haimavata (雪山部), Vātsīputrīya (犢子部), Dharmottara (法上部), Bhadrayānīya (賢冑部), Saṃmitīya (正量部), Channagirika (密林山部), Mahīśāsaka (化地部), Dharmaguptaka (法蔵部), Kāśyapīya (飲光部), Sautrāntika (経量部).)
  - Sarvāstivāda
    - Vātsīputrīya
      - Dharmottara
      - Bhadrayānīya
      - Saṃmitīya
      - Channagirika (Sannāgarika)
    - Mahīśāsaka
      - Dharmaguptaka
    - Kāśyapīya
    - Sautrāntika
- Mahāsāṃghika (Note: Mahāsāṃghika (大衆部) was split into 9 sects. There were: Ekavyahārika (一説部), Lokottaravāda (説出世部), Gokulika (鶏胤部), Bahuśrutīya (多聞部), Prajñaptivāda (説仮部), Caitika (制多山部), Aparaśaila (西山住部), and Uttaraśaila (北山住部).)
  - Ekavyahārika
  - Caitika
  - Lokottaravāda
  - Aparaśaila
  - Gokulika
  - Uttaraśaila
  - Bahuśrutīya
  - Prajñaptivāda

During the first millennium, monks from China such as Faxian, Xuanzang, and Yijing made pilgrimages to India and wrote accounts of their travels when they returned home. These Chinese travel records constitute extremely valuable sources of information concerning the state of Buddhism in India during the early medieval period.

By the time the Chinese pilgrims Xuanzang and Yijing visited India, there were five early Buddhist schools that they mentioned far more frequently than others. They commented that the Sarvāstivāda/Mūlasarvāstivāda, Mahāsāṃghika, and Saṃmitīya were the principal early Buddhist schools still extant in India, along with the Sthavira school. The Dharmaguptakas continued to be found in Gandhāra and Central Asia, along the Silk Road.

It is commonly said that there were eighteen schools of Buddhism in this period. What this actually means is more subtle. First, although the word "school" is used, there was not yet an institutional split in the Saṅgha. The Chinese traveler Xuanzang observed even when the Mahāyāna were beginning to emerge from this era that monks of different schools would live side by side in dormitories and attend the same lectures. Only the books that they read were different. Secondly, no historical sources can agree what the names of these "eighteen schools" were. The origin of this saying is therefore unclear.

A. K. Warder identified the following eighteen early Buddhist schools (in approximate chronological order): Sthaviravāda, Mahāsāṃghika, Vātsīputrīya, Ekavyāvahārika, Gokulika (a.k.a. Kukkuṭika, etc.), Sarvāstivāda, Lokottaravāda, Dharmottariya, Bhadrayaniya, Saṃmitīya, Sannagarika, Bahuśrutīya, Prajñaptivāda, Mahīśāsaka, Haimavata (a.k.a. Kāśyapīya), Dharmaguptaka, Caitika, and the Apara and Uttara (Purva) Saila. Warder says that these were the early Buddhist schools as of circa 50 BCE, about the same time that the Pali Canon was first committed to writing and the presumptive origin date of the Theravāda school, though the term 'Theravāda' was not used before the fourth century. (Note: See Ajahn Sucitto, "What Is Theravada" (2012); see also A. K. Warder, Indian Buddhism, 3rd rev. ed. (Delhi: Motilal Banarsidass, 2000), Chapters 8 and 9.)

A hypothetical combined list would be as follows:

- Sthaviravāda
  - Pudgalavāda ('Personalist') (c. 280 BCE)
    - Vātsīputrīya (during Aśoka) later name: Saṃmitīya
    - Dharmottarīya
    - Bhadrayānīya
    - Sannāgarika
  - Vibhajyavāda (prior to 240 BCE; during Aśoka)
    - Theravāda (c. 240 BCE)
    - (Kāśyapīya (after 232 BCE)) (Note: According to Buswell and Lopez, the Kāśyapīya and Mahīśāsaka were offshoots of the Sarvastivadins, but are grouped under the Vibhajjavāda as "non-Sarvastivada" groups.)
    - (Mahīśāsaka (after 232 BCE))
      - (Dharmaguptaka (after 232 BCE))
  - Sarvāstivāda (c. 237 BCE)
    - (Kāśyapīya (after 232 BCE))
    - (Mahīśāsaka (after 232 BCE))
      - (Dharmaguptaka (after 232 BCE))
    - Sautrāntika (between 50 BCE and c. 100 CE)
    - Mūlasarvāstivāda (3rd and 4th centuries)
    - Vaibhāṣika
- Mahāsāṃghika
  - Ekavyāvahārikas (during Aśoka)
    - Lokottaravāda
  - Gokulika (during Aśoka)
    - Bahuśrutīya (late third century BCE)
    - Prajñaptivāda (late third century BCE)
  - Caitika (mid-first century BCE)
    - Apara Śaila
    - Uttara Śaila

== Innovations of the sects ==
The classic sets of ten, six or four pāramitās (perfections) were codified and developed by these various schools in later sources. (Note: Buswell 2003, p. 632: "Theravada Buddhism, in texts such as Cariyapitaka, Buddhavamsa, and Dhammapadatthakatha, postulates the following ten perfections.") (Note: Dutt 1978, p. 251: "It is evident that the Hinayanists, either to popularize their religion or to interest the laity more in it, incorporated in their doctrines the conception of Bodhisattva and the practice of paramitas. This was effected by the production of new literature: the Jatakas and Avadanas.") Though the actual ideas of these virtues (such as dhyāna, śila, prajñā, etc.) and the idea of the Buddha's past lives are drawn from early Buddhist sources (such as early Jātakas), they were developed further into specific doctrines about the bodhisattva path and how exactly the Buddha undertook it.

The new schools also developed new doctrines about important Buddhist topics. The Sarvāstivādins for example were known for their doctrine of temporal eternalism. Meanwhile, the Mahāsāṃghika school was known for its doctrine of "transcendentalism" (Lokottaravāda), the view that the Buddha was a fully transcendent being. (Note: "Although there was a subschool of the Mahasatghikas known as the Lokottaravada, nevertheless some form of supramundane teaching appears to have been common to all Mahasatghika schools...")

=== Abhidharma ===
As the third major division of the various canons, the Abhidharma collections were a major source of dispute among the various schools. Abhidharma texts were not accepted as canonical by the Mahāsāṃghika school and several other schools. (Note: Buswell 2003, p. 2: "...several schools rejected the authority of abhidharma and claimed that abhidharma treatises were composed by fallible, human teachers.") Another school included most of their version of the Khuddaka Nikāya within their Abhidharma Piṭaka. Also, the Pali version of the Abhidhamma is a strictly Theravāda collection, and has little in common with the Abhidharma works recognised by other Buddhist schools. The various Abhidharma philosophies of the various early schools disagree on numerous key points and belong to the period of sectarian debates among the schools.

The earliest texts of the Pāli Canon (the Sutta Nipāta and parts of the Jātaka), together with the first four (and early) Nikāyas of the Sutta Piṭaka, have no mention of (the texts of) the Abhidhamma Piṭaka. The Abhidhamma is also not mentioned at the report of the First Buddhist Council, directly after the death of the Buddha. This report of the first council does mention the existence of the Vinaya and the five Nikāyas (of the Sutta Piṭaka).

Although the literature of the various Abhidharma Piṭakas began as a kind of commentarial supplement upon the earlier teachings in the Sūtra Piṭaka, it soon led to new doctrinal and textual developments and became the focus of a new form of scholarly monastic life. (Note: "Although begun as a pragmatic method of elaborating the received teachings, this scholastic enterprise soon led to new doctrinal and textual developments and became the focus of a new form of scholarly monastic life.") The various Abhidharma works were starting to be composed from about 200 years after the passing away of the Buddha. (Note: Buswell 2003, p. 2: "Independent abhidharma treatises were composed over a period of at least seven hundred years (ca. third or second centuries B.C.E. to fifth century C.E.).")

Traditionally, it is believed (in Theravādin culture) that the Abhidhamma was taught by Buddha to his late mother who was living in Tāvatiṁsa. However, this is rejected by scholars, who believe that only small parts of the Abhidharma literature may have been existent in a very early form. (Note: Buswell 2003, p. 2: "These similarities [between the Abhidharmas of the various schools] suggest either contact among the groups who composed and transmitted these texts, or a common ground of doctrinal exegesis and even textual material predating the emergence of the separate schools.") The Sarvāstivādins also rejected this idea, and instead held that the Abhidharma was collected, edited, and compiled by the elders (Sthaviras) after the Buddha's death (though they relied on the Buddha's words for this compilation).

Some schools of Buddhism had important disagreements on subjects of Abhidharma, while having a largely similar Sūtra Piṭaka and Vinaya Piṭaka. The arguments and conflicts between them were thus often on matters of philosophical Abhidharmic origin, not on matters concerning the actual words and teachings of Buddha.

One impetus for composing new scriptures like the Adhidharmas of the various schools, according to some scholars, was that Buddha left no clear statement about the ontological status of the world – about what really exists. (Note: Gombrich 1997, p. 34: "If I am right in thinking that the Buddha left no clear statement about the ontological status of the world – about what 'really' exists – this would explain how later Buddhists could disagree about this question.") Subsequently, later Buddhists have themselves defined what exists and what does not (in the Abhidharmic scriptures), leading to disagreements.

=== Late Theravāda texts ===
Oliver Abeynayake has the following to say on the dating of the various books in the Khuddaka Nikāya:

The Khuddaka Nikaya can easily be divided into two strata, one being early and the other late. The texts Sutta Nipata, Itivuttaka, Dhammapada, Therigatha (Theragatha), Udana, and Jataka tales belong to the early stratum. The texts Khuddakapatha, Vimanavatthu, Petavatthu, Niddesa, Patisambhidamagga, Apadana, Buddhavamsa and Cariyapitaka can be categorized in the later stratum.

The texts in the early stratum date from before the second council (earlier than 100 years after Buddha's parinirvāṇa), while the later stratum is from after the Second Council, which means they are definitely later additions to the Sūtra Piṭaka, and that they might not have been the original teachings by the Buddha, but later compositions by disciples.

The following books of the Khuddaka Nikāya can thus be regarded as later additions:

- the Khuddakapāṭha
- the Vimānavatthu
- the Petavatthu
- the Niddesa
- the Paṭisambhidāmagga
- the Apadāna
- the Buddhavaṃsa
- the Cariyāpiṭaka

And the following three which are included in the Burmese Canon:

- the Milindapañha
- the Nettipakaraṇa
- the Peṭakopadesa

The original verses of the Jātakas are recognised as being amongst the earliest part of the canon, but the accompanying (and more famous) Jātaka stories are commentaries likely composed at later dates.

=== Parivāra ===
The Parivāra, the last book of the Vinaya Piṭaka, is a later addition. (Note: "This work (the Parivara) is in fact a very much later composition, and probably the work of a Ceylonese Thera." from: Book of the Discipline, vol. VI, p. ix (translators' introduction).)

=== Other later writings ===
- All literature of the Mahāyāna (the Mahāyāna sūtras). (Note: Buswell 2003, p. 493: "...would throw the earliest phase of this literature (the Mahayana Sutras) back to about the beginning of the common era.")
- All commentarial works (Aṭṭhakathā) of Theravāda and other early Buddhist schools.

== Hīnayāna and Mahāyāna ==
Early Mahāyāna originated, like Therāvada, from the "early Buddhist schools".

Between the 1st century BCE and the 1st century CE, the terms "Mahāyāna" and "Hīnayāna" were first used in writing, in, for example, the Lotus Sūtra. Christian Lindtner suggests that the later Mahāyāna schools may have preserved a certain originally Brahmanist conception of a permanent "absolute" that was abandoned by the "orthodox" Theravāda in favour of "the law of universal impermanence"; or rather, they described the absolute in paradoxical terms in order to reconcile contradictions found within the existing Buddhist canon between the views of consciousness (vijñāna) and Nirvana as either permanent or impermanent. (Note: See also Aṭṭhakavagga and Pārāyanavagga.)

Although the various early schools of Buddhism are sometimes loosely classified as "Hīnayāna" in modern times, this is not necessarily accurate. According to Jan Nattier, Mahāyāna never referred to a separate sect of Buddhism (Skt. Nikāya), but rather to the set of ideals and doctrines for bodhisattvas. Paul Williams has also noted that the Mahāyāna never had nor ever attempted to have a separate Vinaya or ordination lineage from the early Buddhist schools, and therefore each bhikṣu or bhikṣuṇī adhering to the Mahāyāna formally belonged to an early school.

Membership in these Nikāyas, or monastic sects, continues today with the Dharmaguptaka Nikāya in East Asian Buddhism, and the Mūlasarvāstivāda Nikāya in Tibetan Buddhism. Therefore, Mahāyāna was never a separate rival sect of the early schools. Paul Harrison clarifies that while Mahāyāna monastics belonged to a Nikāya, not all members of a Nikāya were Mahāyānists. From Chinese monks visiting India, we now know that both Mahāyāna and non-Mahāyāna monks in India often lived in the same monasteries side by side. Additionally, Isabella Onians notes that Mahāyāna works rarely used the term Hīnayāna, typically using the term Śrāvakayāna instead.

The Chinese Buddhist monk and pilgrim Yijing wrote about relationship between the various "vehicles" and the early Buddhist schools in India. He wrote, "There exist in the West numerous subdivisions of the schools which have different origins, but there are only four principal schools of continuous tradition." These schools are namely the Mahāsāṃghika, Sthavira, Mūlasarvāstivāda and Saṃmitīya Nikāyas. Explaining their doctrinal affiliations, he then writes, "Which of the four schools should be grouped with the Mahāyāna or with the Hīnayāna is not determined." That is to say, there was no simple correspondence between a Buddhist monastic sect, and whether its members learn "Hīnayāna" or "Mahāyāna" teachings.

== Timeline ==
Timeline: Development and propagation of Buddhist traditions (c. 450 BCE – c. 1300 CE)

450 BCE (Note: Cousins, L. S. (1996); Buswell (2003), Vol. I, p. 82; and, Keown & Prebish (2004), p. 107. See also, Gombrich (1988/2002), p. 32: “…[T]he best we can say is that [the Buddha] was probably Enlightened between 550 and 450, more likely later rather than earlier.")
250 BCE
100 CE
500 CE
700 CE
800 CE
1200 CE (Note: Williams (2000, pp. 6-7) writes: "As a matter of fact Buddhism in mainland India itself had all but ceased to exist by the thirteenth century CE, although by that time it had spread to Tibet, China, Japan, and Southeast Asia." (Originally 1958), "Chronology," p. xxix: "c. 1000–1200: Buddhism disappears as [an] organized religious force in India." See also, Robinson & Johnson (1970/1982), pp. 100–101, 108 Fig. 1; and, Harvey (1990/2007), pp. 139–140.)

India

Early
Saṅgha

Early Buddhist schools
Mahāyāna
Vajrayāna

Sri Lanka &
Southeast Asia

Theravāda

Tibetan Buddhism

Nyingma

Kadam
Kagyu

Dagpo
Sakya

Jonang

East Asia

Early Buddhist schools
and Mahāyāna
(via the Silk Road
to China, and ocean
contact from India to Vietnam)

Tangmi

Nara (Rokushū)

Shingon

Chan

Thiền, Seon

Zen
Tiantai / Jìngtǔ

Tendai

Nichiren

Jōdo-shū

Central Asia & Tarim Basin

Greco-Buddhism

Silk Road Buddhism

450 BCE
250 BCE
100 CE
500 CE
700 CE
800 CE
1200 CE

Legend:	= Theravāda	= Mahāyāna	= Vajrayāna	= Various / syncretic

== See also ==
- Aṭṭhakavagga and Pārāyanavagga
- Buddhist Councils
- Early Buddhist Texts
- History of Buddhism
- Index of Buddhism-related articles
- Nikāya Buddhism
- Pyrrhonism
- Rhinoceros Sūtra
- Schools of Buddhism
- Secular Buddhism
- Timeline of Buddhism

== Sources ==
- "Buddhist Council", Encyclopædia Britannica, 1998.
- Berkwitz, Stephen C. (2009), South Asian Buddhism: A Survey, Routledge, ISBN 978-0-415-45248-9.
- Buswell, Robert E. Jr., ed. (2003), Encyclopedia of Buddhism, MacMillan, ISBN 0-02-865718-7.
- Buswell, Robert E. Jr.; Lopez, Donald S. (2013), The Princeton Dictionary of Buddhism, Princeton University Press.
- Cousins, L. S. (1996). "The Dating of the Historical Buddha: A Review Article" in Journal of the Royal Asiatic Society, Series 3, 6.1 (1996): 57–63. Retrieved 29 November 2008 from "Indology" at https://web.archive.org/web/20210413104729/https://indology.info/papers/cousins.
- Cox, Collett (1995), Disputed Dharmas: Early Buddhist Theories on Existence, Tokyo: The Institute for Buddhist Studies, ISBN 4-906267-36-X.
- Dutt, Nalinaksha (1978), Buddhist Sects in India (2nd ed.), Delhi: Motilal Banarsidass, ISBN 978-0-89684-043-0.
- Embree, Ainslie T.; Hay, Stephen N.; de Bary, Wm. Theodore, eds. (1988) [1958], Sources of Indian Tradition: From the Beginning to 1800, vol. 1, A.L. Bashram, R.N. Dandekar, Peter Hardy, J.B. Harrison, V. Raghavan, Royal Weiler, and Andrew Yarrow (2nd ed.), New York: Columbia University Press, ISBN 0-231-06651-1.
- Gombrich, Richard F. (1988; 6th reprint, 2002). Theravāda Buddhism: A Social History from Ancient Benares to Modern Colombo (London: Routledge). ISBN 0-415-07585-8.
- Gombrich, Richard F. (1997), How Buddhism Began, Munshiram Manoharlal.
- Harvey, Peter (1990), An Introduction to Buddhism: Teachings, History and Practices, Cambridge: Cambridge University Press, ISBN 0-521-31333-3.
- Hanh, Thich Nhat (1999), The Heart of Buddha's Teachings, Harmony, ISBN 978-0767903691.
- Hazra, Kanai Lal (1994), Pali Language and Literature: A Systematic Survey and Historical Survey, vol. 1.
- Hoiberg, Dale; Ramchandani, Indu (2000), "Early Buddhist schools", Students' Britannica India, Popular Prakashan, ISBN 0-85229-760-2.
- Huifeng, Shi (2013), "'Dependent Origination = Emptiness' – Nāgārjuna's Innovation? An Examination of the Early and Mainstream Sectarian Textual Sources", Journal of the Centre for Buddhist Studies, Sri Lanka, vol. 11, pp. 175–228, ISSN 1391-8443.
- Hirakawa, Akira (1990), History of Indian Buddhism, vol. 1: From Sakyamuni to Early Mahāyāna, translated by Paul Groner, Hawai'i University Press, hdl:10125/23030.
- Keown, Damien and Charles S Prebish (eds.) (2004). Encyclopedia of Buddhism (London: Routledge), ISBN 978-0-415-31414-5.
- Lindtner, Christian (1997), "The Problem of Precanonical Buddhism", Buddhist Studies Review, 14 (2): 2, doi:10.1558/bsrv.v14i2.14851, archived from the original on 2022-01-29.
- Lindtner, Christian (1999), "From Brahmanism to Buddhism", Asian Philosophy, 9 (1): 5–37, doi:10.1080/09552369908575487.
- Nattier, Jan (2003), A Few Good Men: The Bodhisattva Path According to the Inquiry of Ugra (Ugraparipṛcchā), University of Hawai'i Press, ISBN 978-0824830038.
- Prebish, Charles S., ed. (2010), Buddhism: A Modern Perspective, Pennsylvania State University Press, ISBN 978-0-271-03803-2.
- Robinson, Richard H. and Willard L. Johnson (1970; 3rd ed., 1982). The Buddhist Religion: A Historical Introduction (Belmont, CA: Wadsworth Publishing). ISBN 0-534-01027-X.
- Skilton, Andrew (2004), A Concise History of Buddhism, Windhorse Publications, ISBN 978-0904766929.
- Walser, Joseph (2005), Nagarjuna in Context: Mahayana Buddhism and Early Indian Culture.
- Williams, Paul (1989), Mahayana Buddhism, Routledge, ISBN 978-0-415-35653-4.
- Williams, Paul; Tribe, Anthony (2000), Buddhist Thought: A Complete Introduction to the Indian Tradition, London: Routledge, ISBN 0-415-20701-0.
- Xing, Guang (2004), The Concept of the Buddha: Its Evolution from Early Buddhism to the Trikaya Theory, Routledge Critical Studies in Buddhism, Routledge, ISBN 978-0415333443.
