= Ekavyāvahārika =

Early Buddhist school

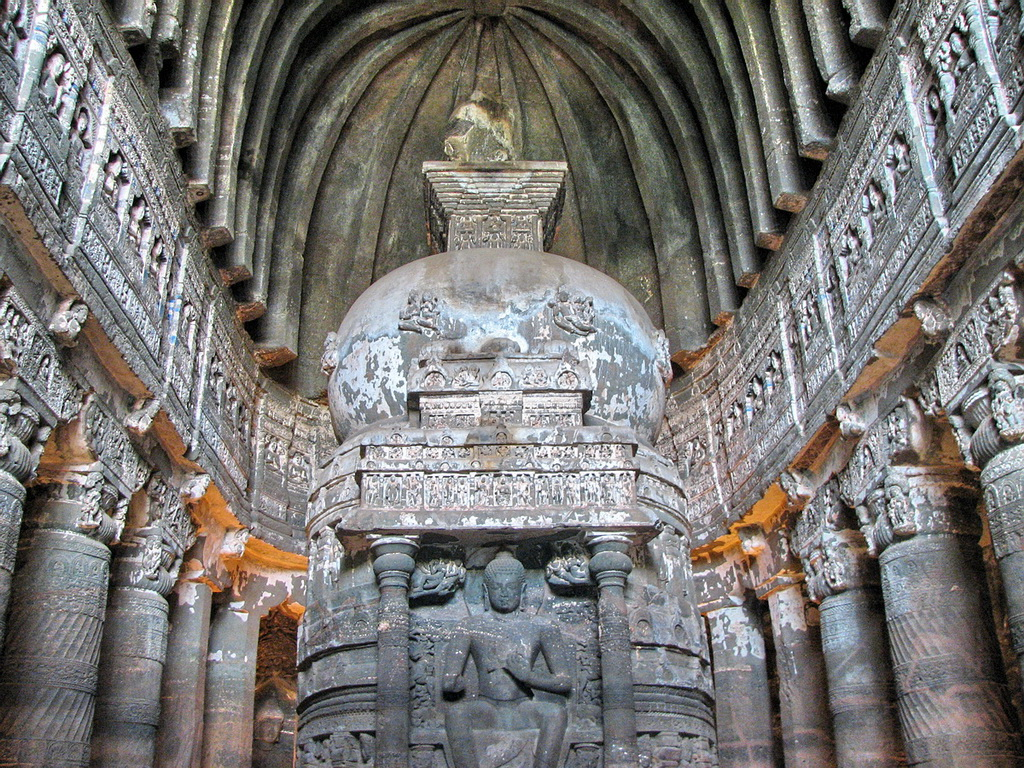
Cave temple associated with the Mahāsāṃghika sect. Ajaṇṭā Caves, Mahārāṣtra, India

The Ekavyāvahārika (Sanskrit: एकव्यावहारिक; traditional Chinese: 一說部; ; pinyin: Yī Shuō Bù; Vietnamese: Nhất thuyết bộ) was one of the early Buddhist schools, and is thought to have separated from the Mahāsāṃghika sect during the reign of Aśoka.

== History ==
=== Relationship to Mahāsāṃghika ===
Tāranātha viewed the Ekavyāvahārikas, Lokottaravādins, and Gokulikas as being essentially the same. He even viewed Ekavyāvahārika as being a general term for the Mahāsāṃghikas. The Ekavyāvahārikas, Gokulikas, and Lokottaravādins are the three groups that emerged from the first split in the Mahāsāṃghika sect. A. K. Warder notes that the Ekavyāvahārikas were hardly known in later times and may have simply have been considered part of the Mahāsāṃghika.

=== Early history ===
The 6th century CE Indian monk Paramārtha wrote that 200 years after the parinirvāṇa of the Buddha, much of the Mahāsāṃghika school moved north of Rājagṛha, and were divided over whether the Mahāyāna teachings should be incorporated formally into their Tripiṭaka. According to this account, they split into three groups based upon the relative manner and degree to which they accepted the authority of these Mahāyāna texts. According to Paramārtha, the Ekavyāvahārikas accepted the Mahāyāna sūtras as the words of the Buddha (buddhavacana).

== Doctrines ==
=== Forty-eight theses ===
The Samayabhedoparacanaćakra of Vasumitra regards the Ekavyāvahārikas, Gokulikas, and Lokottaravādins as being doctrinally indistinguishable. According to Vasumitra, 48 theses were held in common by these three Mahāsāṃghika sects. Of the 48 special theses attributed by the Samayabhedoparacanaćakra to these sects, 20 points concern the supramundane nature of buddhas and bodhisattvas. According to the Samayabhedoparacanaćakra, these four groups held that the Buddha is able to know all dharmas in a single moment of the mind. Yao Zhihua writes:

In their view, the Buddha is equipped with the following supernatural qualities: transcendence (lokottara), lack of defilements, all of his utterances preaching his teaching, expounding all his teachings in a single utterance, all of his sayings being true, his physical body being limitless, his power (prabhāva) being limitless, the length of his life being limitless, never tiring of enlightening sentient beings and awakening pure faith in them, having no sleep or dreams, no pause in answering a question, and always in meditation (samādhi).

=== Trascendent speech ===
The name of the Ekavyāvahārikas refers to their doctrine that the Buddha speaks with a single and unified transcendent meaning. They emphasised the transcendence of the Buddha, asserting that he was eternally enlightened and essentially non-physical. Just as the words of the Buddha were held to be spoken with one transcendent meaning, the Four Noble Truths were understood to be perfectly realised with one wisdom.

=== Fundamentally pure mind ===
The Ekavyāvahārikas held that sentient beings possessed an originally or fundamentally pure mind, but that it has been encumbered and obscured by suffering. This conception of the nature of the mind as being fundamentally the same as that of the Buddha, has been identified with the Mahāyāna doctrines of Buddha-nature and the Buddha's Dharmakāya, as well as compared favorably with doctrines in Mahāyāna sūtras such as the Lotus Sūtra and the Avataṃsaka Sūtra.

== See also ==
- Early Buddhist schools
- Nikāya Buddhism
- Schools of Buddhism
