= Arhat =

Enlightened being in Buddhism

Translations of Arhat
- Sanskrit: अर्हत् (IAST: Arhat)
- Pali: अरहंत् (Arahant or Arhant)
- Bengali: অর্হৎ (ôrhôt)
- Burmese: ရဟန္တာ (MLCTS: ra.ha.nta)
- Chinese: 阿罗汉, 罗汉 阿羅漢, 羅漢 (Traditional) (Pinyin: āluóhàn, luóhàn)
- Japanese: あらかん (Kanji: 阿羅漢, 羅漢) (Katakana: アルハット) (Rōmaji: arakan, rakan)
- Khmer: អរហន្ត (Arahon)
- Korean: 아라한, 나한 (Hanja: 阿羅漢, 羅漢) (RR: arahan, nahan)
- Sinhala: අරහත්, රහත් (Arahat, Rahat)
- Tagalog: Alhat (Baybayin: ᜀᜎ᜕ᜑᜆ᜕)
- Tamil: அருகன் (Aruhan)
- Tibetan: དགྲ་བཅོམ་པ། (Wylie: dgra bcom pa)
- Thai: อรหันต์ (RTGS: arahan)
- Vietnamese: A-la-hán, La hán (Chữ Nôm: 阿羅漢, 羅漢)

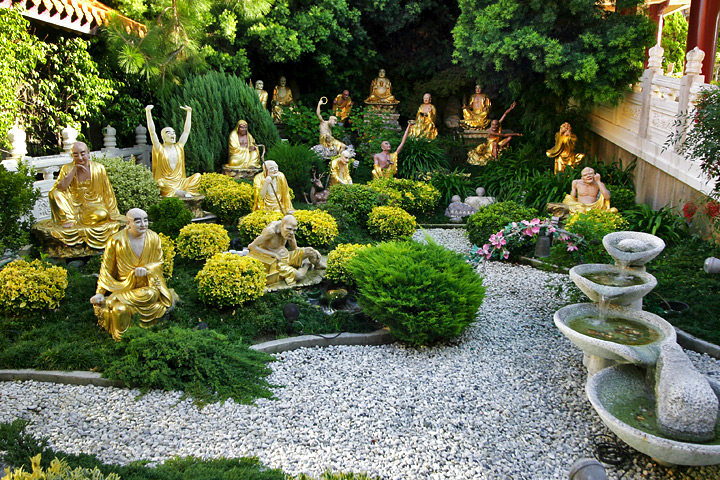
Arhat Garden at Hsi Lai Temple in the San Gabriel Valley of Southern California

In Buddhism, an Arhat (Sanskrit: अर्हत्) or Arahant (Pali: अरहंत्, 𑀅𑀭𑀳𑀦𑁆𑀢𑁆) is one who has gained insight into the nature of existence, has achieved nirvana, and has been liberated from the endless cycle of rebirth.

The understanding of the concept has changed over the centuries, and varies between different schools of Buddhism and different regions. A range of views on the attainment of arhats existed in the early Buddhist schools. Schools derived from the Mahāsāṃghika (such as the Ekavyāvahārika, Lokottaravāda, Bahuśrutīya, Prajñaptivāda, and Caitika), the Kāśyapīya, and the Sarvāstivāda accepted the fallibility and imperfection of arhats. The Dharmaguptaka sect believed that "the Buddha and those of the Two Vehicles, although they have one and the same liberation, have followed different noble paths." The Mahīśāsaka and the Theravāda regarded arhats and buddhas as having attained the same liberation, though differing in the path taken and the qualities developed along the way.

Mahayana Buddhist teachings urge followers to take up the path of a bodhisattva, and to not fall back to the level of arhats and śrāvakas. The arhats, or at least the senior arhats, came to be widely regarded by Theravada buddhists as "moving beyond the state of personal freedom to join the Bodhisattva enterprise in their own way".

Mahayana Buddhism regarded a group of Eighteen Arhats (with names and personalities) as awaiting the return of the Buddha as Maitreya, while other groupings of 6, 8, 16, 100, and 500 also appear in tradition and Buddhist art, especially in East Asia called luohan or lohan. They may be seen as the Buddhist equivalents of the Christian saint, apostles or early disciples and leaders of the faith.

== Etymology ==
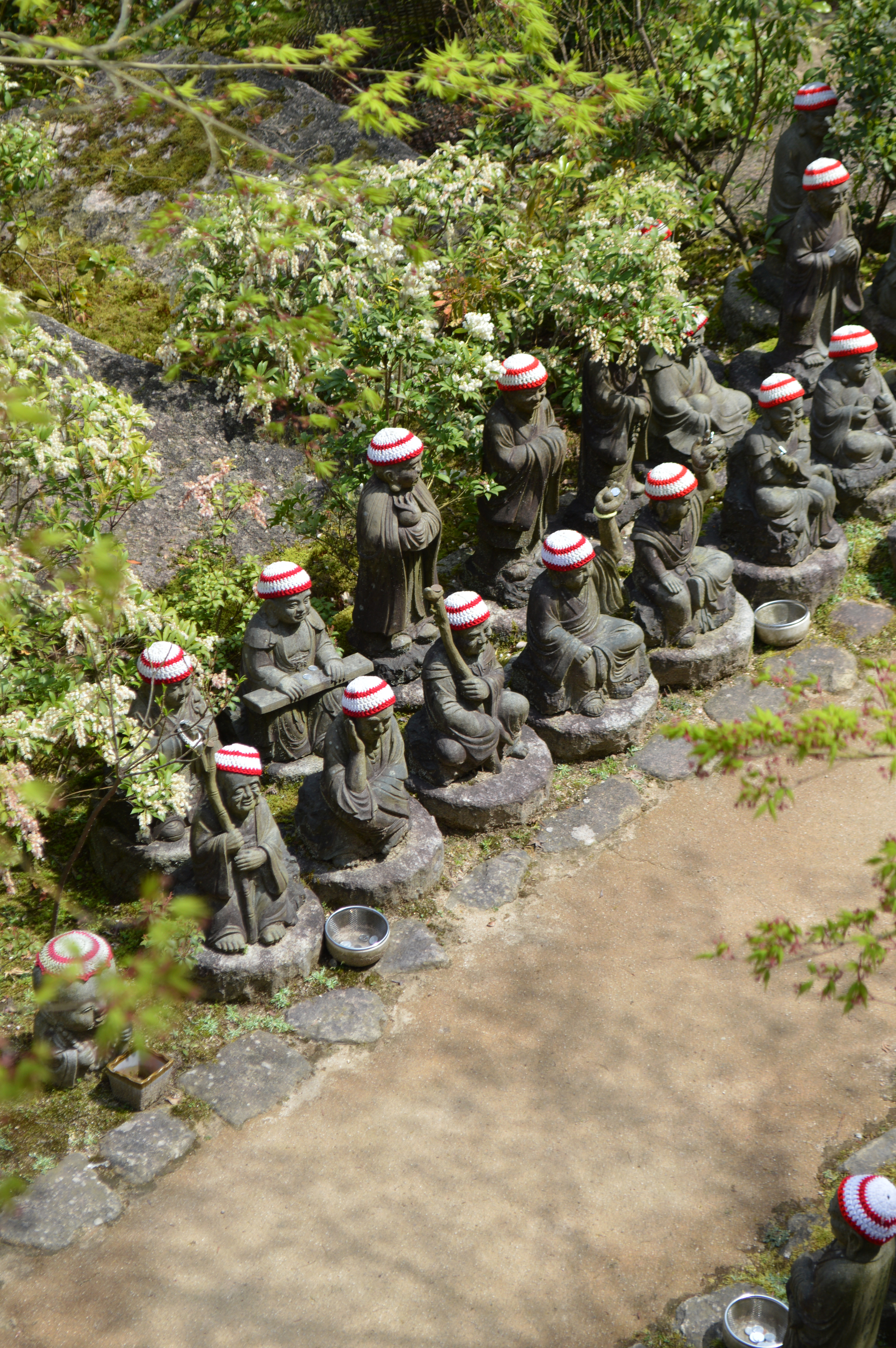
Gohyaku rakan: five hundred statues depicting arhats, at the Daishō-in temple in Miyajima

The Sanskrit word arhat (Pāḷi arahant) is a present participle coming from the verbal root √arh "to deserve", cf. arha "meriting, deserving"; arhaṇa "having a claim, being entitled"; arhita (past participle) "honoured, worshipped". The word is used in the Ṛgveda with this sense of "deserving".

== Meaning ==
=== In early Buddhist schools ===
In pre-Buddhist India, the term arhat (denoting a saintly person in general) was closely associated with miraculous power and asceticism. Buddhists made a sharp distinction between their arhats and Indian holy men, and miraculous powers were no longer central to arhat identity or mission.

A range of views on the relative perfection of arhats existed in the early Buddhist schools. Mahāsāṃghikas, such as the Ekavyāvahārika, Lokottaravāda, Bahuśrutīya, Prajñaptivāda and Caitika schools, advocated the transcendental nature of the buddhas and bodhisattvas and the fallibility of arhats; the Caitikas advocated the ideal of the bodhisattva (bodhisattvayāna) over that of the arhat (śrāvakayāna), and viewed arhats as fallible and still subject to ignorance.

According to A. K. Warder, the Sarvāstivādins held the same position as the Mahāsāṃghika branch about arhats, considering them imperfect and fallible. In the Sarvāstivādin Nāgadatta Sūtra, the demon Māra takes the form of Nāgadatta's father and tries to convince Nāgadatta (who was a bhikṣuṇī) to work toward the lower stage of arhatship rather than strive to become a fully enlightened buddha (samyaksaṃbuddha):

Māra therefore took the disguise of Nāgadatta's father and said thus to Nāgadatta: "Your thought is too serious. Buddhahood is too difficult to attain. It takes a hundred thousand nayutas of koṭis of kalpas to become a Buddha. Since few people attain Buddhahood in this world, why don't you attain Arhatship? For the experience of Arhatship is the same as that of nirvāṇa; moreover, it is easy to attain Arhatship.

In her reply, Nāgadatta rejects arhatship as a lower path: "A Buddha's wisdom is like empty space of the ten-quarters, which can enlighten innumerable people. But an Arhat's wisdom is inferior." The Kāśyapīya school also believed that arhats were fallible and imperfect, similar to the view of the Sarvāstivādins and the Mahāsāṃghika sects. The Kāśyapīyins believed that arhats have not eliminated desire, their "perfection" is incomplete, and it is possible for them to relapse.

The Dharmaguptaka sect believed that "the Buddha and those of the Two Vehicles, although they have one and the same liberation, have followed different noble paths."

The Mahīśāsaka and the Theravada regarded arhats and buddhas as being similar to one another. The 5th century Theravadin commentator Buddhaghosa regarded arhats as having completed the path to enlightenment. (Note: Routledge Encyclopedia of Buddhism: "When the great Theravada commentator, Buddhaghosa, wrote the Visuddhimagga delineating the nature of the gradual path to enlightenment, he placed the arahant at the completion of that path. The arahant stands as a transcendent figure in Theravada, one who has followed to its end the way of Dharma set out by the Buddha.") According to Bhikkhu Bodhi, the Pāli Canon portrays the Buddha declaring himself to be an arahant. (Note: Bhikkhu Bodhi: "The Buddha is the first of the arahants, while those who reach the goal by following his path also become arahants. In the verse of homage to the Buddha, it is said: "Iti pi so Bhagavā Arahaṃ... — The Blessed One is an arahant..." Shortly after his enlightenment, while walking to Benares to meet the five monks, a wanderer stopped the Buddha and asked who he was. The Buddha replied: "I am the arahant in the world, I am the supreme teacher" (MN 26/I 171). So the Buddha first of all declares himself to be an arahant.") Bhikkhu Bodhi states that nirvāṇa is "the ultimate goal", and one who has attained nirvana has attained arhatship; (Note: "From the perspective of the Nikāyas, the ultimate goal – the goal in strict doctrinal terms – is nirvāṇa, and the goal in human terms is arahantship, the state of a person who has attained nirvāṇa in this present life.") He writes, "The defining mark of an arahant is the attainment of nirvāṇa in this present life."

=== In Theravāda Buddhism ===
In Theravada Buddhism, an arahant is a person who has eliminated all the unwholesome roots which underlie the fetters – who upon their death will not be reborn in any world, since the bonds (fetters) that bind a person to samsara have been finally dissolved. In the Pali Canon, the word tathāgata is sometimes used as a synonym for arhat, though the former usually refers to the Buddha alone. (Note: Peter Harvey, The Selfless Mind. Curzon Press 1995, p. 227: Before focusing on key passages on the tathāgata, it is first necessary to clarify which persons the word refers to. The Buddha often used it when talking of himself as an enlightened being, rather than as the individual Gotama. In general, "tathāgata" is used specifically of the Buddha, the one who discovers and proclaims the path to nirvana (A.II.8–9, S.III.65-6), with the "Tathāgata, Arahat, perfectly and completely Enlightened One" being contrasted with a "disciple of the Tathāgata" (D.II.142). Nevertheless, "tathāgata" is sometimes used of any Arahat. S.V.327, for example, discusses the "dwelling of a learner" and that of a tathāgata, and explains the second by describing the qualities of an Arahat. At M.I.139–140 and 486-7, moreover, there is a switching between talk of a "tathāgata" and of "a monk whose mind is freed thus", as if they were simple equivalents. Tathāgata literally means "thus-gone" or "thus-come", probably meaning one who is "attained-to-truth" or "whose-nature-is-from-truth".)

After attainment of nirvana, the five aggregates (physical forms, feelings/sensations, perception, mental formations and consciousness) will continue to function, sustained by physical bodily vitality. This attainment is termed the nirvana element with a residue remaining (Pali: saupadisesa nibbāna). But once the arhat passes away and with the disintegration of the physical body, the five aggregates will cease to function, hence ending all traces of existence in the phenomenal world and thus total release from the misery of samsara. It would then be termed the nirvana element without residue remaining. Parinirvana occurs at the death of an arhat.

In Theravada Buddhism, the Buddha himself is first identified as an arhat, as are his enlightened followers, because they are free from all defilements, existing without greed, hatred, delusion, ignorance and craving. Lacking "assets" which will lead to future birth, the arhat knows and sees the real here and now. This virtue shows stainless purity, true worth, and the accomplishment of the end, nirvana.

In the Pali canon, Ānanda states that he knows monastics to achieve nirvana in one of four ways: (Note: Bodhi (2005), p. 268, translates this fourth way as: "a monk's mind is seized by agitation about the teaching." Thanissaro (1998) gives a seemingly contrary interpretation of: "a monk's mind has its restlessness concerning the Dhamma [Comm: the corruptions of insight] well under control." Thus, it appears possible to interpret the excitation (Pali: uddhacca, see Rhys Davids & Stede, 1921–25) as either something that the future arahant uses to impel their pursuit of the path or something that the future arahant controls in order to pursue the path.)

- one develops insight preceded by serenity (Pali: samatha-pubbaṇgamaṃ vipassanaṃ),
- one develops serenity preceded by insight (vipassanā-pubbaṇgamaṃ samathaṃ),
- one develops serenity and insight in a stepwise fashion (samatha-vipassanaṃ yuganaddhaṃ),
- one's mind becomes seized by excitation about the dhamma and, as a consequence, develops serenity and abandons the fetters (dhamma-uddhacca-viggahitaṃ mānasaṃ hoti).

For those that have destroyed greed and hatred (in the sensory context) with some residue of delusion, are called anagami (non-returner). Anagamis will not be reborn into the human world after death, but into the heaven of the Pure Abodes, where only anagamis live. There, they will attain full enlightenment.

The Theravadin commentator Buddhaghosa placed the arhat at the completion of the path to liberation. (Note: Keown and Prebish (2007), Routledge Encyclopedia of Buddhism, p. 36: "When the great Theravada commentator, Buddhaghosa, wrote the Visuddhimagga delineating the nature of the gradual path to enlightenment, he placed the arahant at the completion of that path. The arahant stands as a transcendent figure in Theravada, one who has followed to its end the way of Dharma set out by the Buddha.")

=== In Mahāyāna Buddhism ===
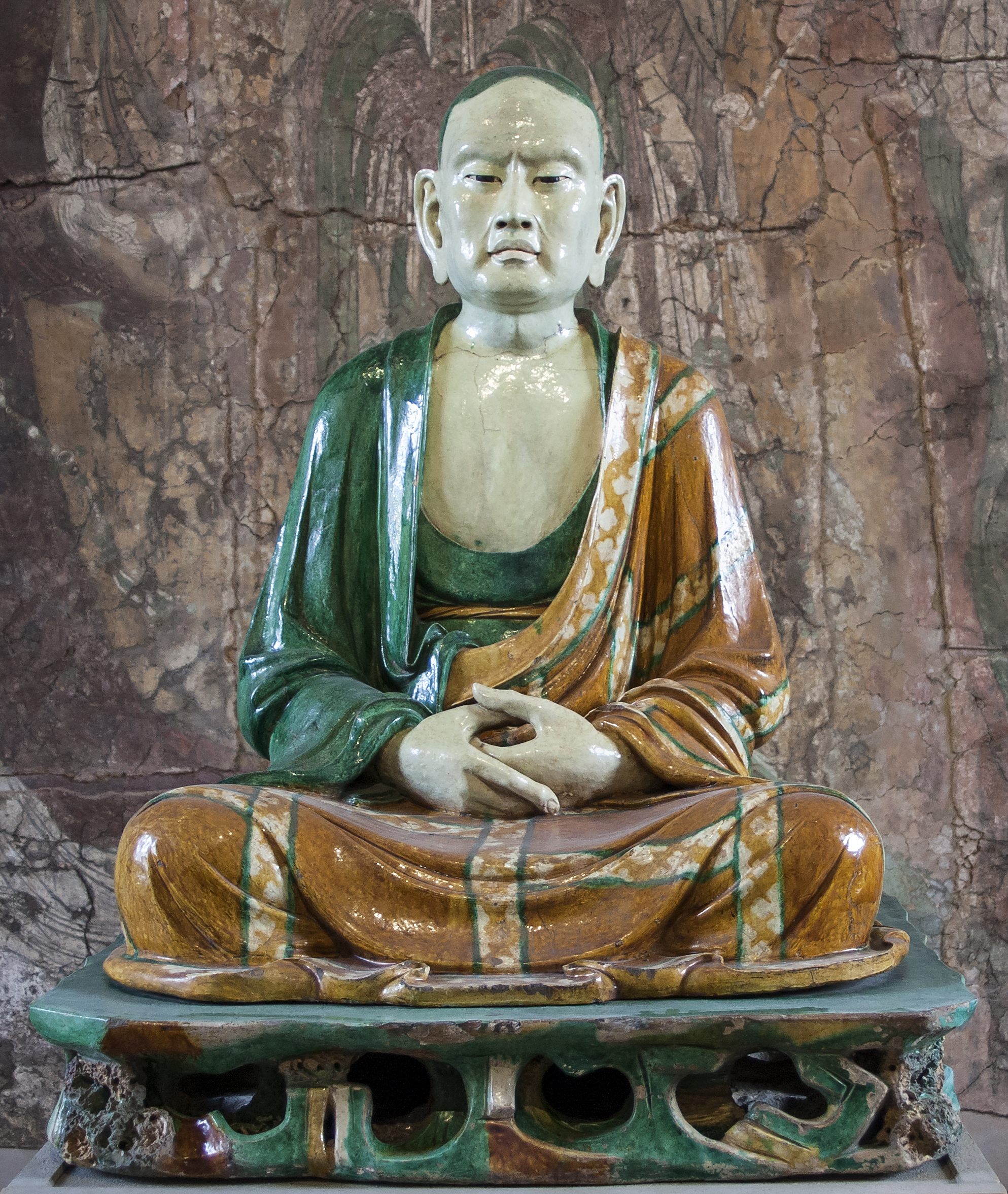
Seated Luohan from Yixian, around 1000, one of a famous group of glazed pottery luohans from Yixian; British Museum

Mahayana Buddhists see Gautama Buddha himself as the ideal towards which one should aim in one's spiritual aspirations. A hierarchy of general attainments is envisioned with the attainments of arhats and pratyekabuddhas being clearly separate from and below those of samyaksambuddha or tathāgatas such as Gautama Buddha.

In contrast to the goal of becoming a fully enlightened buddha, the path of a śrāvaka in being motivated by seeking personal liberation from saṃsāra is often portrayed as selfish and undesirable. There are even some Mahāyāna texts that regard the aspiration to arhatship and personal liberation as an outside path. Instead of aspiring for arhatship, Mahayanins are urged to instead take up the path of the bodhisattva and to not fall back to the level of arhats and śrāvakas. Therefore, it is taught that an arhat must go on to become a bodhisattva eventually. If they fail to do so in the lifetime in which they reach the attainment, they will fall into a deep samādhi of emptiness, thence to be roused and taught the bodhisattva path, presumably when ready. According to the Lotus Sutra, any true arhat will eventually accept the Mahāyāna path.

Mahāyāna teachings often consider the śrāvaka path to be motivated by fear of saṃsāra, which renders them incapable of aspiring to buddhahood, and that they therefore lack the courage and wisdom of a bodhisattva. Novice bodhisattvas are compared to śrāvakas and arhats at times. In the Aṣṭasāhasrikā Prajñāpāramitā Sūtra, there is an account of sixty novice bodhisattvas who attain arhatship despite themselves and their efforts at the bodhisattva path because they lacked the abilities of prajnaparamita and skillful means to progress as bodhisattvas toward complete enlightenment (Skt. Anuttarā Samyaksaṃbodhi). This is because they are still viewed as having innate attachment and fear of saṃsāra. The Aṣṭasāhasrikā Prajñāpāramitā Sūtra compares these people to a giant bird without wings that cannot help but plummet to the earth from the top of Sumeru.

Mahayan Buddhism has viewed the śrāvaka path culminating in arhatship as a lesser accomplishment than complete enlightenment, but still accords due respect to arhats for their respective achievements. Therefore, buddha-realms are depicted as populated by both śrāvakas and bodhisattvas. Far from being completely disregarded, the accomplishments of arhats are viewed as impressive, essentially because they have transcended the mundane world. Chinese Buddhism and other East Asian traditions have historically accepted this perspective, and specific groups of arhats are venerated as well, such as the Sixteen Arhats, the Eighteen Arhats, and the Five Hundred Arhats. The first famous portraits of these arhats were painted by the Chinese monk Guanxiu (Chinese: 貫休; pinyin: Guànxiū) in 891 CE. He donated these portraits to Shengyin Temple in Qiantang (modern Hangzhou), where they are preserved with great care and ceremonious respect.

In some respects, the path to arhatship and the path to complete enlightenment are seen as having common grounds. However, a distinctive difference is seen in the Mahāyāna doctrine pushing emotional and cognitive non-attachment to their logical consequences. Of this, Paul Williams writes that in Mahāyāna Buddhism, "Nirvāṇa must be sought without being sought (for oneself), and practice must be done without being practiced. The discursive mode of thinking cannot serve the basic purpose of attainment without attainment."

The Mahayana discerned a hierarchy of attainments, with samyaksambuddhas at the top, mahāsattvas below that, pratyekabuddhas below that and arhats further below. "But what was it that distinguished the bodhisattva from the sravaka, and ultimately the buddha from the arhat? The difference lay, more than anywhere else, in the altruistic orientation of the bodhisattva."

== Translations ==
The term arhat is often rendered in English as arahat. The term arhat was transliterated into some East Asian languages phonetically, for example, the Chinese āluóhàn (Ch. 阿羅漢), often shortened to simply luóhàn (Ch. 羅漢). This may appear in English as luohan or lohan. In Japanese the pronunciation of the same Chinese characters is rakan (Ja. 羅漢) or arakan (Ja. 阿羅漢).

The Tibetan term for arhat was translated by meaning from Sanskrit. This translation, dgra bcom pa (Ti. དགྲ་བཅོམ་པ།), means "one who has destroyed the foes of afflictions". Thus the Tibetan translators also understood the meaning of arhat to be ari-hanta.

== See also ==
- Buddhist paths to liberation
- Enlightenment in Buddhism
- Four stages of enlightenment
- Paccekabuddha
- Ten Principal Disciples
- Yixian glazed pottery luohans
- Killing an arhat is a anantarika-karma crime.

== General sources ==
- Prebish, Charles; Keown, Damien, eds. (2004). Encyclopedia of Buddhism. Routledge. ISBN 978-0415314145.
- Rhie, Marylin; Thurman, Robert (1991). Wisdom And Compassion: The Sacred Art of Tibet. new York: Harry N. Abrams (with 3 institutions). ISBN 0810925265.
- Warder, A.K. (2000). Indian Buddhism. Delhi: Motilal Banarsidass Publishers.
