= Nikaya Buddhism =

Group of early Buddhist schools

The term Nikāya Buddhism was coined by Masatoshi Nagatomi as a non-derogatory substitute for Hinayana, meaning the early Buddhist schools. Examples of these groups are pre-sectarian Buddhism and the early Buddhist schools. Some scholars exclude pre-sectarian Buddhism when using the term. The term Theravāda refers to Buddhist practices based on these early teachings, as preserved in the Pāli Canon.

== Etymology ==
Nikāya is a Pali word meaning "group" or "assemblage", referring to the collection of early Buddhist schools or non-Mahayana schools.

== In Indian Buddhism ==
=== Overview ===
Early Buddhism in India is generally divided into various monastic fraternities, or nikāyas. Conventionally numbering eighteen, the actual count varied over time. The doctrinal orientation of each school differed somewhat, as did the number of piṭakas ("baskets") in their canon. An example of this is the Dharmaguptaka, which included a Bodhisattva piṭaka and a Dhāraṇī piṭaka.

=== In the Mahāsāṃghika branch ===
The Mahāsāṃghika nikāyas generally advocated the transcendental and supramundane nature of the buddhas and bodhisattvas, and the fallibility of arhats. Therefore, for the Mahāsāṃghikas, the bodhisattva ideal and buddhahood was advocated over the ideal of becoming an arhat.

Avalokitavrata wrote of the Mahāsāṃghikas as using a "Great Āgama Piṭaka", which is then associated with Mahāyāna sūtras such as the Prajñāparamitā and the Ten Stages Sutra. In the Caitika group of nikāyas, the Pūrvaśailas and the Aparaśailas each were known to have the Aṣṭasāhasrikā Prajñāpāramitā Sūtra in Prakrit. Bhāvaviveka also wrote of the Siddhārthikas using a Vidyādhāra Piṭaka, and the Pūrvaśailas and Aparaśailas both using a Bodhisattva Piṭaka, implying organized collections of Mahāyāna texts within these Mahāsāṃghika nikāyas.

=== In the Sthaviravāda branch ===
In the Sthavira nikāya, the Sarvāstivādins were a major nikāya. The Sarvāstivādin Mahāvibhāṣā Śāstra is known to employ the outlook of Buddhist practice as consisting of three vehicles: Śrāvakayāna, Pratyekabuddhayāna, and Bodhisattvayāna. References to the Bodhisattvayāna and the practice of the Six pāramitās are commonly found in Sarvāstivāda works as well.

The Theravada sect from Sri Lanka generally accepts the three vehicles, but categorizes these as three different types of bodhi, or enlightenment. The Theravada nikaya only uses the Pāli Canon, which has three piṭakas, and does not contain separate literature for bodhisattvas. Walpola Rahula writes of this, "At the end of a religious ceremony or an act of piety, the bhikkhu who gives benedictions, usually admonishes the congregation to make a resolution to attain Nirvana by realising one of the three Bodhis - Sravakabodhi, Pratyekabodhi or Samyaksambodhi - as they wish according to their capacity."

== Relationship to Mahāyāna ==
Jan Nattier writes that there is also no evidence that Mahāyāna ever referred to a separate formal school or sect of Buddhism, but rather that it existed as a certain set of ideals, and later doctrines, for bodhisattvas. Paul Williams has similarly noted that the Mahāyāna never had nor ever attempted to have a separate vinaya or ordination lineage from the Indian nikāyas, and therefore each bhikṣu or bhikṣuṇī adhering to the Mahāyāna formally belonged to one of these nikāyas. This continues today with the Dharmaguptaka nikāya in East Asia, and the Mūlasarvāstivāda nikāya in Tibetan Buddhism.

== "Hinayana" and Nikaya Buddhism ==
Many commenters on Buddhism have used the term Hīnayāna to refer to Nikāya Buddhism. However, that term is now generally seen as flawed:

- Hīnayāna, (literally "inferior vehicle"), is often regarded as an offensive or pejorative term.
- Hīnayāna was coined by the Mahāyāna, and has never been used by Nikāya Buddhists to refer to themselves.
- Hīnayāna as a technical term, indicated the vehicles of both the Sāvakabuddha and the pratyekabuddha, whereas as a division of Buddhism, it refers solely to the individuals who follow the former vehicle, towards the achievement of Savakabuddhahood, while the Mahāyāna in the sense of the bodhisattva path existed within the early schools already.
- It is sensible to use a terms for a division of population which is ideally used by themselves, and failing that, at least not offensive to them.

According to Robert Thurman, the term "Nikāya Buddhism" was coined by Masatoshi Nagatomi of Harvard University, as a way to avoid the usage of the term Hinayana. "Nikaya Buddhism" is thus an attempt to find a more neutral way of referring to Buddhists who follow one of the early Buddhist schools, and their practice.

The term Śrāvakayāna (literally, "hearer vehicle" or "disciples' vehicle") is also sometimes used for the same purpose. Other terms that have been used in similar senses include sectarian Buddhism or conservative Buddhism. Note that nikāya is also a term used in Theravāda Buddhism to refer to a subschool or subsect within Theravada.

Like the term Hinayana Buddhism, the term Nikāya Buddhism focuses on the presumed commonality between the schools, and not on the actual schools themselves. This commonality is thought to be found in a certain attitude. The term "Nikāya Buddhism" tries to shift the attention to the more neutral issue of attitude concerning the authenticity of scriptures.

A concise analysis by the Tibetan Buddhist, Reginald Ray, summarises the mistaken and confusing use of the term "Hīnayāna" to refer to any contemporary extant schools:

"Hīnayāna" refers to a critical but strictly limited set of views, practices, and results. The pre-Mahāyāna historical traditions such as the Theravāda are far richer, more complex, and more profound than the definition of "Hīnayāna" would allow. ... The term "Hīnayāna" is thus a stereotype that is useful in talking about a particular stage on the Tibetan Buddhist path, but it is really not appropriate to assume that the Tibetan definition of Hīnayāna identifies a venerable living tradition as the Theravāda or any other historical school[.]

== See also ==
- Early Buddhist schools
