= Kathāvatthu =

One of the seven books in the Abhidhamma Pitaka of Pali Canon

- SuttaCentral; OpenTipitaka
- Type: Canonical text
- Parent: Abhidhamma Piṭaka
- Attribution: Moggaliputtatissa; Bhāṇaka
- Aṭṭhakathā: Pañcapakaraṇa-aṭṭhakathā (Kathāvatthu-aṭṭhakathā)
- Commentator: Buddhaghosa
- Ṭīkā: Pañcapakaraṇamūlaṭīkā; Pañcapakaraṇa-anuṭīkā
- Abbreviation: Kv; Kvu

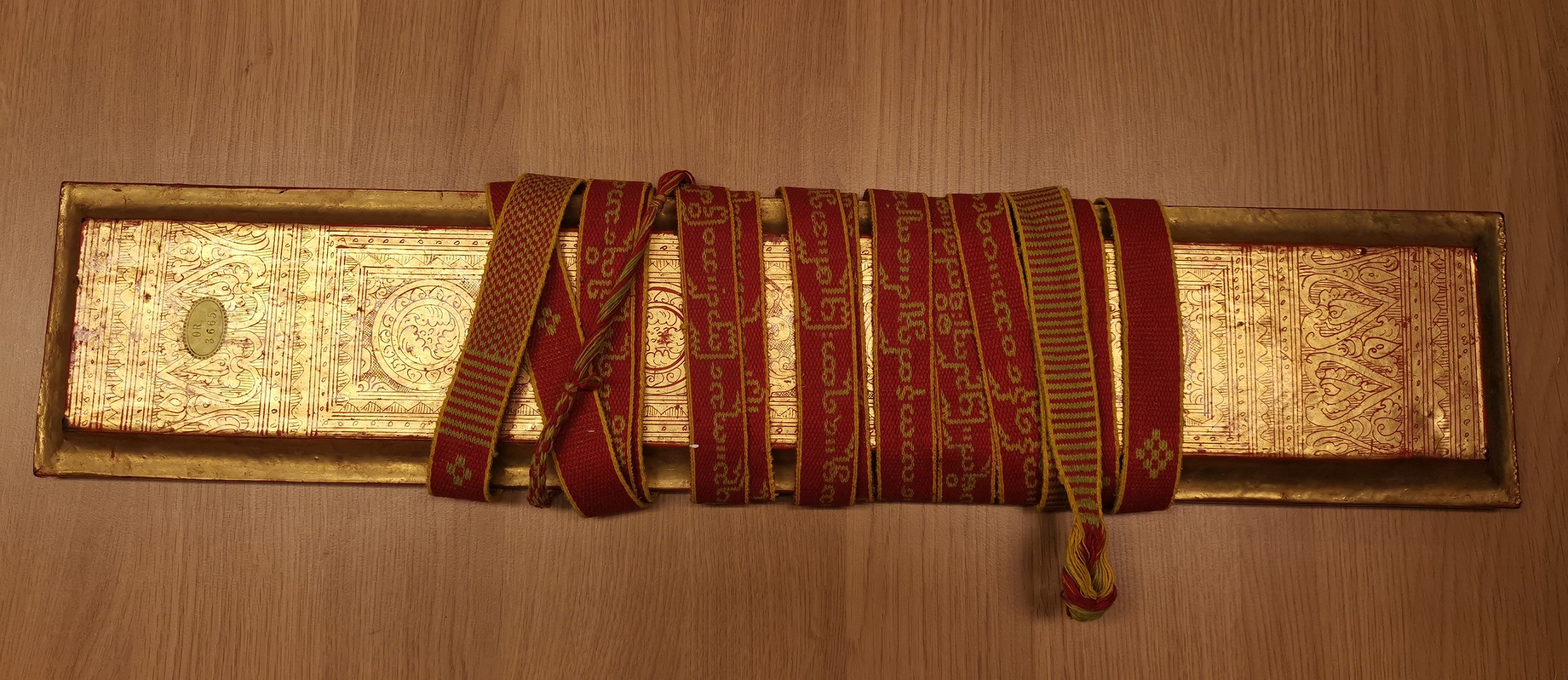
Burmese manuscript containing the Kathāvatthu with an over 4 m long sazigyo (ribbon) made in the tablet weaving technique on a backstrap loom with dedicatory inscription in Burmese language, 19th century. British Library

Kathāvatthu (Pāli) (Vietnamese: Bộ Ngữ Tông (Biện Giải); abbreviated Kv, Kvu; transl. "Points of Controversy") is a Buddhist scripture, one of the seven books in the Theravada Abhidhamma Pitaka. The text contrasts the orthodox Theravada position on a range of issues to the heterodox views of various interlocutors; the latter are not identified in the primary source text, but were speculatively identified with specific schools of thought in the (historically subsequent) commentaries. The original text is putatively dated to coincide with the reign of King Ashoka (around 240 B.C.), but this, too, is debatable.

== Organization ==
The Kathavatthu documents over 200 points of contention. The debated points are divided into four paṇṇāsaka (lit., "group of 50"). Each paṇṇāsaka is again divided, into 20 chapters (vagga) in all. In addition, three more vagga follow the four paṇṇāsaka.

Each chapter contains questions and answers by means of which the most diverse views are presented, refuted and rejected. The form of the debates gives no identification of the participants, and does not step outside the debate to state explicitly which side is right.

The views deemed non-heretical by the commentary's interpretation of the Katthavatthu were embraced by the Theravada denomination. According to the Commentaries those whose views were rejected include the Sarvastivada.

== Doctrinal positions ==
The text focuses on refuting the views of various Buddhist schools, these include:

- The views of the Pudgalavada school, which held that a 'person' exists as a real and ultimate fact and that it transmigrates from one life to the next.
- That a perfected being (Arhat) can fall away from perfection.
- The views of the Sarvastivadins, that "all [dharmas] exists" in the three times (past, present, future), a form of temporal eternalism.
- That an Arhat can have a nocturnal emission.
- That an Arhat may be lacking in knowledge, have doubts or be excelled by others.
- That the duration of an awareness event can last a day or more.
- That penetration and insight into the various stages of enlightenment is achieved gradually.
- That the Buddha's worldly speech was somehow supramundane.
- That all the powers of the Buddha are also possessed by his leading disciples.
- That a layperson can become an Arhat.
- That one can attain enlightenment at the moment of rebirth.
- That the Four Noble Truths, the immaterial states, space, and dependent origination are unconditioned.
- That there is an intermediate state (Bardo) of existence
- That all dhammas last for only a moment (ksana).
- That all is due to Karma.
- That it ought not be said the monastic order accepts gifts.
- That the Buddha himself did not teach the dharma, but that it was taught by his magical creation.
- That one who has attained jhana continues to hear sound
- That the five gravest transgressions (matricide, patricide, etc.) involve immediate retribution even when committed unintentionally.
- That final liberation can be obtained without eliminating a certain fetter.

== Canonicity ==
The inclusion of the Kathavatthu in the Abhidhamma Pitaka has sometimes been thought of as something of an anomaly. First, the book is not regarded as being the words of the Buddha himself - its authorship is traditionally attributed to Moggaliputta Tissa. However this is not unusual: the Vinaya's accounts of the first two Councils are obviously also not the Buddha's actual words. Second, the subject matter of the Kathavatthu differs substantially from that of the other texts in the Abhidhamma – but this is true of the Puggalapaññatti as well.

Scholars sometimes also point to the inclusion of some obviously later (relatively new) sections of the Kathavatthu in the Tipitaka as an indication that the Pāli Canon was more 'open' than has sometimes been thought, and as illustrative of the process of codifying new texts as canonical. In fact this too is not unusual, there being quite a bit of relatively late material in the Canon.

== Interpretation ==
The debates are understood by the tradition, followed by many scholars, as disputes between different schools of Buddhism. However, L. S. Cousins, described by Professor Gombrich as the West's leading abhidhamma scholar, says:

"In spiritual traditions the world over, instructors have frequently employed apparent contradictions as part of their teaching method – perhaps to induce greater awareness in the pupil or to bring about a deeper and wider view of the subject in hand. The Pali Canon contains many explicit examples of such methods. (Indeed much of the Kathāvatthu makes better sense in these terms than as sectarian controversy.)"

== Translations ==
Points of Controversy, tr. S.Z. Aung & C.A.F. Rhys Davids (1915, 1993), Pali Text Society, Bristol.

== See also ==
- Moggaliputta-Tissa
- Buddhist Councils > Third Buddhist Council
- Early Buddhist Schools > Vibhajjavada, Sarvastivada

== Sources ==
- Geiger, Wilhelm (trans. fr. German by Batakrishna Ghosh) (2004). Pāli Literature and Language. New Delhi: Munshiram Manoharlal Publishers. ISBN 81-215-0716-2.
- Hinüber, Oskar von (2000). A Handbook of Pāli Literature. Berlin: Walter de Gruyter. ISBN 3-11-016738-7.
- McDermott, James P. (1975). "The Kathavatthu Kamma Debates" in the Journal of the American Oriental Society, Vol. 95, No. 3 (Jul. - Sep., 1975), pp. 424–433.
