= Sthavira Nikāya =

Early Buddhist school

The Sthavira Nikāya (Sanskrit: "Sect of the Elders"; Chinese: 上座部; pinyin: Shàngzuò Bù; Vietnamese: Trưởng lão bộ) was one of the early Buddhist schools. They split from the majority Mahāsāṃghikas at the time of the Second Buddhist Council.

== Scholarly views ==
=== Origin ===
The Sthavira Nikāya was one of the early Buddhist schools. The Sthavira Nikāya was separated from the majority Mahāsāṃghikas during the Second Buddhist Council resulting in the first schism in the Sangha.

The Mahāsāṃghika Śāriputraparipṛcchā, a text written to justify this school's departure from the disciplinary code of the elder monks, asserts that the council was convened at Pāṭaliputra over matters of Vinaya, and it is explained that the schism resulted from the majority (Mahāsaṃgha) refusing to accept the addition of rules to the Vinaya by the minority (Sthaviras). The Mahāsāṃghikas therefore saw the Sthaviras as being a breakaway group which was attempting to modify the original Vinaya. However, this text is not fully accepted by some Buddhist schools, such as the Theravāda, which instead claim that it was the Mahāsāṃghika who altered the original rules.

Scholars have generally agreed that the matter of dispute was indeed a matter of Vinaya, and have noted that the account of the Mahāsāṃghikas is bolstered by the Vinaya texts themselves, as Vinayas associated with the Sthaviras do contain more rules than those of the Mahāsāṃghika Vinaya.

Some scholars therefore agree that the Mahāsāṃghika Vinaya is the oldest, although some other scholars think that it is not the case. According to Skilton, future scholars may determine that a study of the Mahāsāṃghika school will contribute to a better understanding of the early Dharma-Vinaya than the Theravāda school. According to Bhante Sujato, there is no strong evidence that the Mahāsāṃghika Vinaya is the oldest; both the Mahāsāṃghika and Theravāda Vinayas developed in parallel from shared ancient sources, each containing both older and later elements. Declaring one as definitively “the earliest” is an oversimplification not supported by the academic evidence.

=== Language ===
The Tibetan historian Buton Rinchen Drub (1290–1364) wrote that the Mahāsāṃghikas used Prakrit, the Sarvāstivādins used Sanskrit, the Sthaviras used Paiśācī, and the Saṃmitīya used Apabhraṃśa.

=== Legacy ===
The Sthaviras later divided into other schools such as:

- Sarvāstivāda
- Vatsīputrīya
- Vibhajyavāda (Pali: Vibhajjavāda)

The Vibhajyavāda branch gave rise to a number of schools such as:

- Mahīśāsaka
- Dharmaguptaka
- Kāśyapīya
- Tāmraparnīya, later called "Theravāda"

== Relationship to Theravāda ==
=== Scholarly accounts ===
The Theravāda school of Sri Lanka and Southeast Asia has identified itself exclusively with the Sthaviras, as the Pali word thera is equivalent to the Sanskrit sthavira. This has led early Western historians to assume that the two parties are identical. However, this is not the case, and by the time of Ashoka, the Sthavira sect had split into the Sammitīya, Pudgalavāda, Sarvāstivāda, and the Vibhajyavāda schools.

The Vibhajyavāda school is believed to have split into other schools as well, such as the Mahīśāsaka school and the ancestor of the Theravāda school. According to Damien Keown, there is no historical evidence that the Theravāda school arose until around two centuries after the Great Schism which occurred at the Third Council.

=== Theravādin accounts ===
Starting with the Dīpavaṃsa chronicle in the 4th century, the Theravādins of the Mahāvihāra in Sri Lanka attempted to identify themselves with the original Sthavira sect. The Theravādin Dīpavaṃsa clarifies that the name Theravāda refers to the "old" teachings, making no indication that it refers to the Second Council. Similarly, the name Mahāsāṃghika is in reference to those who follow the original Vinaya of the undivided Saṃgha. The Dīpavaṃsa chronicle lauds the Theravāda as a "great banyan" and dismissively portrays the other early Buddhist schools as thorns (kaṇṭaka). Dīpavaṃsa, 4.90–91 says:

These 17 sects are schismatic,
only one is non-schismatic.
With the non-schismatic sect,
there are eighteen in all.
Like a great banyan tree,
the Theravāda is supreme,
The Dispensation of the Conqueror,
complete, without lack or excess.
The other sects arose
like thorns on the tree.
— Dīpavaṃsa, 4.90–91

According to the Mahāvaṃsa, a Theravādin source, after the Second Council was closed those taking the side of junior monks did not accept the verdict but held an assembly of their own attended by ten thousand calling it a Mahasangiti (Great Convocation) from which the school derived its name Mahāsāṃghika. However, such popular explanations of Sthavira and Mahāsāṃghika are generally considered folk etymologies.

Bhante Sujato explains the relationship between the Sthavira sect and the Theravāda:

The term sthavira (meaning "elder") is the Sanskrit version of the term better known today in its Pali version thera, as in Theravāda, the "Teaching of the Elders." The original Sthaviras, however, are by no means identical with the modern school called Theravāda. Rather, the Sthaviras are the ancestor of a group of related schools, one of which is the Theravāda.

== See also ==
- Early Buddhist schools
- Schools of Buddhism
- Buddhist councils
