= Tamrashatiya =

Early school of Buddhism

Translations of Tāmraśāṭīya
- Sanskrit: Tāmraparṇīya; Tāmraśāṭīya
- Pali: Tambapaṇṇiya
- Chinese: 赤銅鍱部; 紅衣部 (Pinyin: Chìtóngyèbù; Hóngyībù)
- Japanese: 赤銅鍱部(しゃくどうようぶ) (Rōmaji: Shakudōyōbu)
- Korean: 적동섭부 (RR: Jeokdongseopbu)
- Tibetan: གོས་དམར་སྡེ་ (Wylie: gos dmar sde) (THL: gö mar dé)
- Vietnamese: Xích Đồng Diệp Bộ

The Tāmraśāṭīya (Sanskrit: ताम्रशाटीय, Tāmraśāṭīya), also called Tāmraparṇīya (Sanskrit; Pali: Tambapaṇṇiya) or Theriya Nikāya (Pali), was one of the early schools of Buddhism and a Sri Lankan branch of the Vibhajyavāda (ancestor of the Theravāda) school based in Sri Lanka.

Its sūtras were written mainly in Pali; and the Pali Canon of Buddhism largely borrowed from this school. The Tāmraśāṭīya is also known as the Southern transmission or Mahaviharavasin tradition. This contrasts with Sarvāstivāda or the 'Northern transmission', which was mostly written in Sanskrit and translated into Chinese and Tibetic languages.

The Tamrashatiya played a major role in the development of Theravāda Buddhism and influenced Buddhist thoughts in Myanmar, Thailand, and other parts of Southeast Asia.

== Etymology ==
Several etymologies are given for the name of this school.

Tāmra is a Sanskrit term referring to the color of red copper, describing the color of the monks' robes. Based on the standard Chinese translation of the term, it has also been suggested that "copper" refers to copper plates on which the Tripiṭaka was written.

Tāmraparṇi was also an old name for Sri Lanka, and the origin of the Greek equivalent Taprobana, possibly referring to the monks who established Buddhism here.

== Branches ==
The Tāmraśāṭīya school was established in modern-day Sri Lanka in the city of Anuradhapura, but also remained active in Andhra and other parts of South India, such as Vanavasa in modern Karnataka, and later across Southeast Asia.

The school survived in Sri Lanka and established three main branches:

- Mahāvihāra, thought to be one of the origins of the Theravāda
- Abhayagiri Vihāra, branched from the Mahāvihāra in the first century BC and incorporated Mahāyāna and Vajrayāna doctrine
- Jetavana Vihāra, branched from the Abhayagiri Vihāra in the third century.

According to the Mahāvaṃsa the latter two traditions were suppressed and destroyed after the Mahāvihāra tradition gained political power.

== See also ==
- Vibhajyavāda
- Sarvāstivāda
- Theravāda
- Southern, Eastern and Northern Buddhism (Tāmraśāṭīya is sometimes thought of as the "Southern transmission" or "Southern Buddhism")
