= Bahuśrutīya =

Early Buddhist school

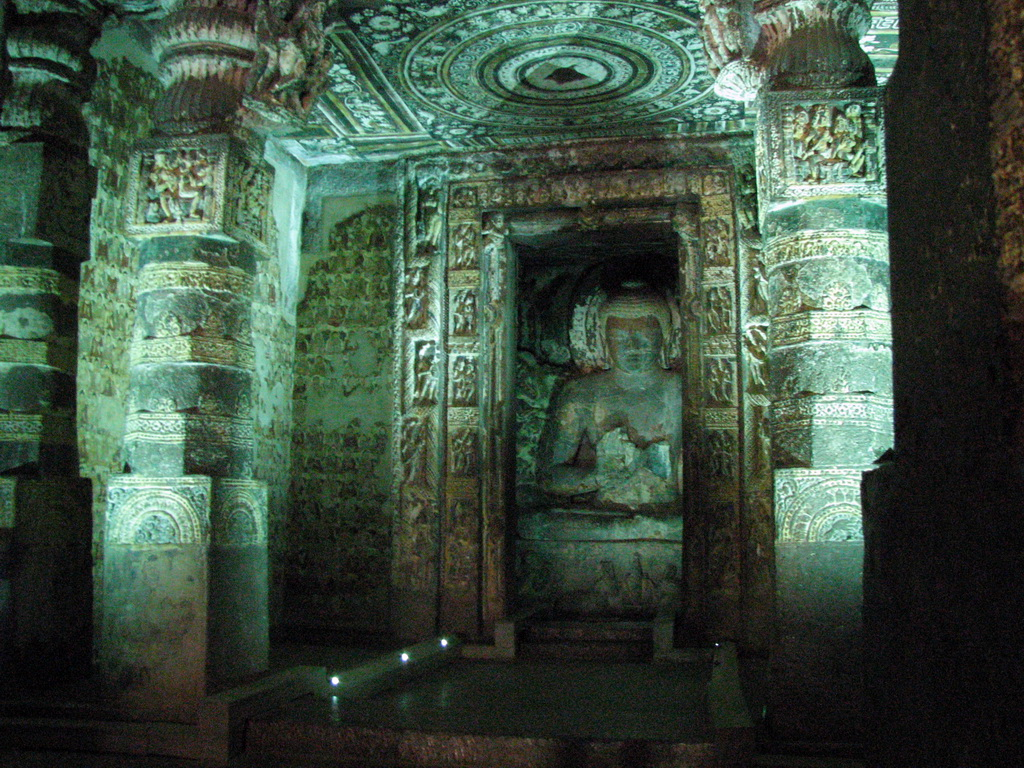
Cave temple associated with the Mahāsāṃghika sect. Ajaṇṭā Caves, Mahārāṣtra, India.

The Bahuśrutīya (Sanskrit: बहुश्रुतीय) was one of the early Buddhist schools, according to early sources such as Vasumitra, the Śāriputraparipṛcchā, and other sources, and was a sub-group which emerged from the Mahāsāṃghika sect.

== Etymology ==
The name Bahuśrutīya means literally "those who have heard much", meaning "well-learned". The Chinese translation for the name of this sect, Duowen Bu (多聞部), literally the "much-heard sect", also corresponds to this etymology. Vasumitra's history, the Samayabhedoparacanaćakra, records the following explanation of the name and characteristics of the Bahuśrutīya sect:

Broadly studying the Tripiṭaka
And profoundly comprehending the Buddha's words;
It is by these virtues that they are referred to
By the name, the "Bahuśrutīya" sect.

== Origins ==
Paramārtha, a 6th-century monk from Ujjain in Central India, wrote that the founder of the Bahuśrutīya sect was named Yājñavalkya. In Paramārtha's account, Yājñavalkya is said to have lived during the time of the Buddha, and to have heard his discourses, but was in a profound state of samādhi during the time of the Buddha's parinirvāṇa. After Yājñavalkya emerged from this samādhi 200 years later, he discovered that the Mahāsāṃghikas were teaching only the superficial meaning of the sūtras, and he therefore founded the Bahuśrutīya sect in order to expound their full meaning.

Paramārtha links the origins of the Bahuśrutīya sect to the Mahāyāna teachings:

In the Mahāsāṃghika school this Arhat recited completely the superficial sense and the profound sense. In the latter, there was the sense of the Mahāyāna. Some did not believe it. Those who believed it recited and retained it. There were in the Mahāsāṃghika school those who propagated these teachings, and others who did not propagate them. The former formed a separate school called "Those who have heard much" (Bahuśrutīya). [...] It is from this school that there has come the Satyasiddhiśāstra. That is why there is a mixture of ideas from the Mahāyāna found there.

== Doctrines and canon ==
The translator Paramārtha wrote that the Bahuśrutīyas accepted both the Hīnayāna and Mahāyāna teachings. According to Paramārtha, the Bahuśrutīya school was formed in order to fully embrace both "conventional truth" and "ultimate truth". According to Sree Padma and Anthony Barber, the Bahuśrutīya understanding of this full exposition included the Mahāyāna teachings.

According to Vasumitra, the Bahuśrutīyas considered the Buddha's teachings of impermanence, suffering, emptiness, anātman, and nirvāṇa to be supramundane, while his expositions on other subjects were to be considered mundane. K. Venkata Ramanan writes:

The credit of having kept alive the emphasis on the ultimacy of the unconditioned reality by drawing attention to the non-substantiality of the basic elements of existence (dharma-śūnyatā) belongs to the Mahāsāṃghikas. Every branch of these clearly drew the distinction between the mundane and the ultimate, came to emphasize the non-ultimacy of the mundane and thus facilitated the fixing of attention on the ultimate. The Bahuśrutīyas distinguished the mundane from the transmundane teachings of the Buddha and held that the latter directly lead one to freedom from defilements.

Like the other Mahāsāṃghika sects, the Bahuśrutīyas believed that arhats were fallible.

== Tattvasiddhi Śāstra ==
=== Overview ===
The Tattvasiddhi Śāstra, also called the Satyasiddhi Śāstra, is an extant Abhidharma text written by Harivarman, a 4th-century monk from Central India. Harivarman is often thought to come from the Bahuśrutīya school, but the Tattvasiddhi contains teachings more similar to those of the Sautrāntika Sarvāstivādins. This Abhidharma is now contained in the Chinese Buddhist canon in sixteen fascicles (Taishō Tripiṭaka 1646). Paramārtha cites this Abhidharma text as containing a combination of Hīnayāna and Mahāyāna doctrines, and Joseph Walser agrees that this assessment is correct. Ian Charles Harris also characterises the text as a synthesis of Hīnayāna and Mahāyāna, and notes that its doctrines are very close to those in Mādhyamaka and Yogāćāra works.

The Tattvasiddhi includes the teaching of dharma-śūnyatā, the emptiness of phenomena. This text also mentions the existence of a Bodhisattva Piṭaka.

=== Legacy in East Asia ===
The Tattvasiddhi Śāstra maintained great popularity in Chinese Buddhism, and even lead to the formation of its own school of Buddhism in China, the Tattvasiddhi School, or Chéngshí Zōng (成實宗), which was founded in 412 CE. As summarised by Nan Huai-Chin:

Various Buddhist schools sprang to life, such as the school based on the three Mādhyamaka śāstras, the school based on the Abhidharmakośa, and the school based on the Satyasiddhi Śāstra. These all vied with each other, producing many wondrous offshoots, each giving rise to its own theoretical system.

The Tattvasiddhi School taught a progression of twenty-seven stations for cultivating realisation, based upon the teachings of the Tattvasiddhi Śāstra. The Tattvasiddhi School took Harivarman as its founder in India, and Kumārajīva as the school's founder in China. The Satyasiddhi School is counted among the Ten Schools of Tang dynasty. From China, the Satyasiddhi School was transmitted to Japan in 625 CE, where it was known as Jōjitsu-shū (成實宗). The Japanese Satyasiddhi school is known as one of the six great schools of Japanese Buddhism in the Nara period (710–794 CE).
