= A. K. Warder =

British Indologist (1924–2013)

- Born: Anthony Kennedy Warder; 8 September 1924; England
- Died: 8 January 2013 (aged 88); Toronto, Canada
- Spouse: Nargez Warder

Academic background
- Education: School of Oriental and African Studies, University of London
- Thesis: Pali Metre: A Study of the Evolution of Early Middle Indian Metre Based on the Verse Preserved in the Pali Canon (1954)
- Doctoral advisor: John Brough

Academic work
- Discipline: Indologist
- Institutions: University of Edinburgh; University of Toronto
- Main interests: Early Buddhism; Indian philosophy; Kāvya literature; Pali; Sanskrit
- Notable works: Introduction to Pali (1963); Indian Buddhism (1970); Indian Kāvya Literature (1972–2011)

Anthony Kennedy Warder (8 September 1924 – 8 January 2013) was a British Indologist. His best-known works are Introduction to Pali (1963), Indian Buddhism (1970), and the eight-volume Indian Kāvya Literature (1972–2011).

== Life ==
Warder was born in England on 8 September 1924.

He studied Sanskrit and Pali at the School of Oriental and African Studies, and received his doctorate from there in 1954. His thesis, supervised by John Brough, was entitled Pali Metre: A Study of the Evolution of Early Middle Indian Metre Based on the Verse Preserved in the Pali Canon. (When it was published in 1967, the title was changed to Pali Metre: A Contribution to the History of Indian Literature.)

For a number of years, he was an active member of the Pali Text Society, which published his first book, Introduction to Pali, in 1963. He based this popular primer on extracts from the Dīgha Nikāya, and took the then revolutionary step of treating Pali as an independent language, not just a derivative of Sanskrit.

His began his academic career at the University of Edinburgh in 1955, but in 1963 moved to the University of Toronto. There, as Chairman of the Department of East Asian Studies, he built up a strong programme in Sanskrit and South Asian studies. He retired in 1990.

Studies on Buddhism in Honour of Professor A. K. Warder was published in 1993, edited by Narendra K. Wagle and Fumimaro Watanabe.

He and his wife, Nargez, died of natural causes almost simultaneously on 8 January 2013. He was eighty-eight, and she was ninety. They had no children. They were buried together following a Buddhist service.

== Notable works ==
- Introduction to Pali (1st ed. 1963, 2nd ed. 1974, 3rd ed. 1991)
- Pali Metre: A Contribution to the History of Indian Literature (1967)
- Indian Buddhism (1st ed. 1970, 2nd ed. 1980, 3rd ed. 2000)
- A Course in Indian Philosophy (1st ed. 1971, 2nd ed. 1998) (Note: First edition published as Outline of Indian Philosophy.)
- An Introduction to Indian Historiography (1972)
- Indian Kāvya Literature: Volumes I–VIII (1972–2011)
  - Volume 1: Literary Criticism
  - Volume 2: Origins and Formation of the Classical Kāvya
  - Volume 3: The Early Medieval Period (Śūdraka to Viśākhadatta)
  - Volume 4: The Ways of Originality (Bāṇa to Dāmodaragupta)
  - Volume 5: The Bold Style (Śaktibhadra to Dhanapāla)
  - Volume 6: The Art of Storytelling
  - Volume 7: The Wheel of Time
  - Volume 8: The Performance of Kāvya in the +14
