= Vaibhāṣika =

School of Buddhist philosophy

Sarvāstivāda-Vaibhāṣika (Sanskrit: सर्वास्तिवाद-वैभाषिक) or simply Vaibhāṣika (वैभाषिक) was an ancient Buddhist tradition of Abhidharma (scholastic Buddhist philosophy), which was very influential in North India, especially Kashmir. In various texts, they referred to their tradition as Yuktavāda (the doctrine of logic), and another name for them was Hetuvāda (the doctrine of causes). The Vaibhāṣika school was an influential subgroup of the larger Sarvāstivāda school. They were distinguished from other Sarvāstivāda sub-schools like the Sautrāntika and the "Western Masters" of Gandhara and Bactria by their orthodox adherence to the doctrines found in the Mahāvibhāṣa, from which their name is derived (Vaibhāṣa is a vṛddhi derivative of vibhāṣa, meaning "related to the vibhāṣa"). Vaibhāṣika thought significantly influenced the Buddhist philosophy of all major Mahāyāna Buddhist schools of thought and also influenced the later forms of Theravāda Abhidhamma (though to a much lesser extent).

The Sarvāstivāda tradition arose in the Mauryan Empire during the second century BCE, and was possibly founded by Kātyānīputra (c. 150 BCE). During the Kushan era, the "Great Commentary" (Mahāvibhāṣa) on Abhidharma was compiled, marking the beginning of Vaibhāṣika as a proper school of thought. This tradition was well-supported by Kanishka, and later spread throughout North India and Central Asia. It maintained its own canon of scriptures in Sanskrit, which included a seven-part Abhidharma Piṭaka collection. Vaibhāṣika remained the most influential Buddhist school in Northwest India from the first century CE until the seventh century.

Despite numerous variations and doctrinal disagreements within the tradition, most Sarvāstivāda-Vaibhāṣikas were united in their acceptance of the doctrine of "sarvāstitva" (all exists), which says that all phenomena in the three times (past, present and future) can be said to exist. Another defining Vaibhāṣika doctrine was that of simultaneous causation (sahabhū-hetu), hence their alternative name of "Hetuvāda".

== Sources ==
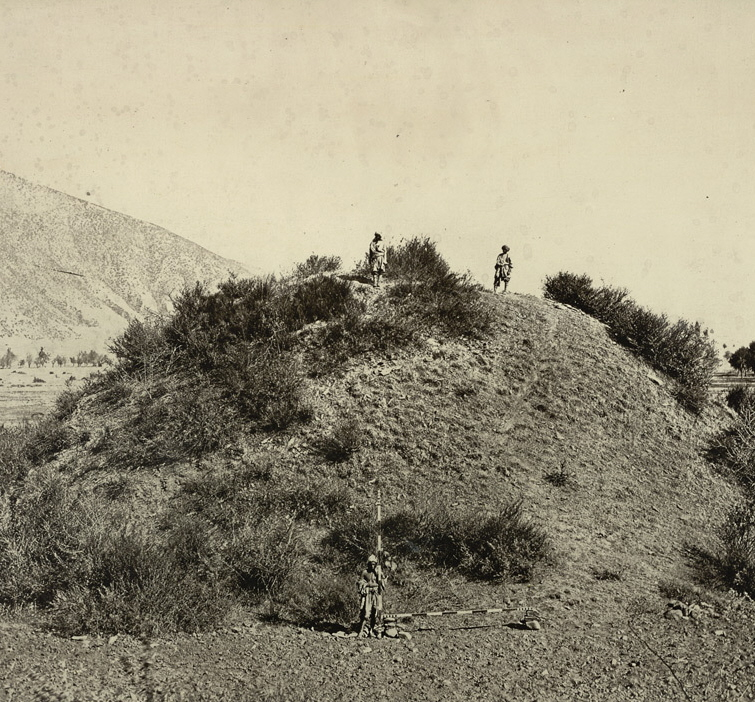
Stupa of Jayendra Vihar at Ushkur (Huṣkapur) near Baramulla, Jammu and Kashmir, during excavations in 1869. Jayendra was known as great center of learning and Xuanzang is said to have studied Sarvāstivāda Abhidharma here.

=== Canonical texts ===
The main source of this tradition is the Sarvāstivāda Abhidharma Piṭaka.

The texts of the Sarvāstivādin Abhidharma Piṭaka are:

- Sangītiparyāya ('Discourses on Gathering Together'), essentially a commentary on the Samgiti Sūtra (T. 9, Dīgha Nikāya No. 33).
- Dharmaskandha ('Aggregation of Dharmas'), a list of key doctrinal topics.
- Prajñāptiśāstra ('Treatise on Designations'), a list of doctrinal topics followed by question and answer sections.
- Dhātukāya ('Collection of Elements'), similar to the Dhātukathā, though it uses a different doctrinal list of dharmas.
- Vijñānakāya ('Collection of Consciousness'), attributed to master Devasarman. It is here that the existence of all dharmas through past, present and future, is first found.
- Prakaraṇapāda ('Exposition')

Together, these comprise the Six Treatises (Chinese: 六足論; Sanskrit: षड्पादशास्त्र, Ṣaḍ-pāda-śāstra). The seventh text is the Jñānaprasthāna ('Foundation of Knowledge'), also known as Aṣṭaskandha or Aṣṭagrantha, said to be composed by Kātyāyanīputra.

Yaśomitra is said to have likened this text to the body of the above six treatises, referring to them as its legs (pādas).

=== Exegetical texts ===
The Jñānaprasthāna became the basis for Sarvastivāda exegetical works called vibhāṣa, which were composed in a time of intense sectarian debate among the Sarvāstivādins in Kashmir. These compendia not only contain sūtra references and reasoned arguments but also contain new doctrinal categories and positions. The most influential of these was the Abhidharma Mahāvibhāṣa Śāstra ("Great Commentary"), a massive work which became the central text of the Vaibhāṣika tradition who became the Kashmiri Sarvāstivāda orthodoxy under the patronage of the Kushan Empire.

There are also two other extant vibhāṣa compendia, though there is evidence for the existence of many more of these works which are now lost. The Vibhāṣa Śāstra of Sitapani and the Abhidharma Vibhāṣa Śāstra translated by Buddhavarman c. 437 and 439 CE are the other extant Vibhāṣa works. Though some scholars claim the Mahāvibhāṣa dates to the reign of Kanishka during the first century CE, this dating is uncertain. However, we at least know it was translated into Chinese by the late 3rd or early 4th century.

=== Treatises ===
In addition to the canonical Sarvāstivādan Abhidharma, a variety of expository texts or treatises were written to serve as overviews and introductions to the Abhidharma. The best known belonging to the Sarvāstivāda tradition are:

- Abhidharma-hṛdaya-śāstra (The Heart of Abhidharma), by the Tocharian Dharmasresthin, circa 1st. century BCE, Bactria. It is the oldest example of a systematised Sarvāstivāda treatise.
- Abhidharma-āmrtaṛasa (The Taste of the Deathless) by the Tocharian Ghoṣaka, 2nd century, based on the above work.
- Abhidharma-hṛdaya-śāstra (The Heart of Abhidharma) by Upasanta, also based on Dharmasresthin's Abhidharma-hṛdaya-śāstra.
- Samyuktabhidharma-hṛdaya by Dharmatrata, also based on Dharmasresthin's Abhidharma-hṛdaya-śāstra.
- Abhidharmakośa-bhāsya (Treasury of Higher Knowledge) by Vasubandhu (4th or 5th century) – a highly influential series of verses and accompanying commentary by Vasubandhu. It often critiques Vaibhāṣika views from a Sautrantika perspective. This is the main text used to study Abhidharma in Tibet and East Asia. It remains influential in Chinese and Tibetan Buddhism. However, K. L. Dhammajoti notes that this work sometimes presents the Vaibhāṣika views unfairly.
- Abhidharmakośopāyikā-ṭīkā, a commentary on the Kośa by Śamathadeva.
- Nyāyānusāra (Conformance to Correct Principle) by Saṃghabhadra, an attempt to criticise Vasubandhu and defend orthodox Vaibhāṣika views.
- Abhidharma-samaya-pradīpikā, a compendium of the above by Saṃghabhadra.
- Abhidharmavatara ("Descent into the Abhidharma"), an introductory treatise by master Skandhila (5th century).
- Abhidharma-dipa and its auto-commentary, the Vibhāṣa-prabha-vrtti, a post-Saṃghabhadra Vaibhāṣika treatise which follows closely the Abhidharmakośa verses and attempts to defend Vaibhāṣika orthodoxy.

The most mature and refined form of Vaibhāṣika philosophy can be seen in the work of master Saṃghabhadra (c. 5thcentury), "undoubtedly one of the most brilliant Abhidharma masters in India". His two main works, the *Nyāyānusāra (Shun zhengli lun 順正理論) and the *Abhidharmasamayapradīpikā (Apidamo xian zong lun 阿毘達磨顯宗論), are very important sources for late Vaibhāṣika thought. His work was referenced and cited by various important figures, such as Xuanzang and Sthiramati.

== Dharmas ==
=== Dharmas and their characteristics ===
All Buddhist schools of Abhidharma divided up the world into "dharmas" (phenomena, factors, or "psycho-physical events"), which are the fundamental building blocks of all phenomenal experience. Unlike the sūtras, the Abhidharma analyses experience into these momentary psycho-physical processes. Dharmas refers to the discrete and impermanent instances of consciousness along with their intentional objects that rapidly arise and pass away in sequential streams. They are analogous to atoms, but are psycho-physical. Hence, according to Noa Ronkin, "all experiential events are understood as arising from the interaction of dharmas."

From the Vaibhāṣika perspective, "Abhi-dharma" refers to analysing and understanding the nature of dharmas and the wisdom (prajñā) that arises from this. This systematic understanding of the Buddha's teaching was seen by Vaibhāṣikas as the highest expression of the Buddha's wisdom which was necessary to practice the Buddhist path. It is seen as representing the true intention of the Buddha on the level of absolute truth (paramārtha-satya). According to the Mahāvibhāṣa, "Abhidharma is [precisely] the analysis of the intrinsic characteristics and common characteristics of dharmas."

For Vaibhāṣikas, dharmas are the "fundamental constituents of existence" which are discrete and real entities (dravya). K. L. Dhammajoti states:

A dharma is defined as that which holds its intrinsic characteristic (svalakṣaṇadhāraṇād dharmaḥ). The intrinsic characteristic of the dharma called rūpa, for example, is the susceptibility of being molested (rūpyate), obstructability and visibility; that of another dharma called vedanā is sensation, etc. And for a dharma to be a dharma, its intrinsic characteristic must be sustainable throughout time: A rūpa remains a rūpa irrespective of its various modalities. It can never be transformed into another different dharma (such as vedanā). Thus, a uniquely characterizable entity is a uniquely real (in the absolute sense) entity, having a unique intrinsic nature (svabhāva): “To be existent as an absolute entity is to be existent as an intrinsic characteristic (paramārthena sat svalakṣaṇena sad ityarthaṛ).”

This idea is seen in the Jñānaprasthāna which states: "Dharmas are determined with respect to nature and characteristic... Dharmas are determined, without being co-mingled. They abide in their intrinsic natures, and do not relinquish their intrinsic natures (T. 26, 923c)."

According to Vaibhāṣikas, the svabhāvas of dharmas are those things that exist substantially (dravyasat) as opposed to those things which are made up of aggregations of dharmas and thus only have a nominal existence (prajñaptisat). This distinction is also termed the doctrine of the two truths, which holds that there is a conventional truth (saṁvṛti) that refers to things which can be further analysed, divided or broken up into smaller constituents and an ultimate truth (paramārtha) referring to that which resists any further analysis.

Thus, a dharma's intrinsic characteristic (svalakṣaṇa) and the very ontological existence of a dharma (i.e. svabhāva, "intrinsic nature", or dravya, "substance") is one and the same. For the Vaibhāṣika school, this "own nature" (svabhāva) was said to be the characteristic of a dharma that persists through the three times (past, present and future).

Vaibhāṣika Abhidharma also describes dharmas as having "common characteristics" (sāmānya-lakṣaṇa), which applies to numerous dharmas (for example, impermanence applies to all material dharmas and all feelings, etc.). Only the mental consciousness can cognise common characteristics.

However, the intrinsic characteristics of a dharma have a certain kind of relativity due to the relationship between various dharmas. For example, all rūpa (form) dharmas have the common characteristic of resistance, but this is also an intrinsic characteristic with respect to other dharmas like vedanā (feeling).

Also, various sources state that the intrinsic nature of a dharma is "weak" and that they are interdependent with other dharmas. The Mahāvibhāṣa states that "conditioned dharmas are weak in their intrinsic nature, they can accomplish their activities only through mutual dependence" and that "they have no sovereignty (aisvarya). They are dependent on others." Thus, an intrinsic nature (svabhāva) arises due to dependently originated processes or relationships between various dharmas and therefore, a svabhāva is not something which is completely ontologically independent.

=== Classification of dharmas ===
Abhidharma thought can be seen as an attempt at providing a complete account of every type of experience. Therefore, an important part of Vaibhāṣika Abhidharma comprises the classification, definition and explanation of the different types of dharma as well as the analysis of conventional phenomena and how they arise from the aggregation of dharmas. Thus there is the element of dividing up things into their constituents as well as the element of synthesis, i.e. how dharmas combine to make up conventional things.

The Vaibhāṣikas made use of classic early Buddhist doctrinal categories such as the five skandhas, the sense bases (āyatanas) and the "eighteen dhātus". Beginning with the Pañcavastuka of Vasumitra, the Vaibhāṣikas also adopted a five group classification of dharmas which outlined a total of 75 types of phenomena.

The five main classifications of dharmas are:

- Rūpa (11 dharma types), refers to matter or physical phenomena/events.
- Ćitta (1 type), refers to thought, intentional consciousness or the bare phenomenon of consciousness. Its main characteristic is cognising an object.
- Ćaitasikas (46 types) refers to "thought-concomitants", mental events or "associated mentality".
- Ćittaviprayuktasaṃskāras (14 types) refers to "conditionings disjoined from thought" or "factors disassociated from thought". This category is unique to Vaibhāṣika and not shared with other Abhidharma schools. It groups together various experiential events that are not associated with thought but are also not physical.
- Asaṃskṛta dharmas (3 types) refers to the three unconditioned dharmas: space and two states of cessation (nirodha).

Dharmas are also classified and divided into further taxonomical categories providing further aids to understanding the Buddhist view and path. Some of the major ways that the Vaibhāṣikas classified dharmas include the following:

- Skillful, wholesome or useful on the path (kuśala), unskillful (akuśala) or non-defined/non-determined (avyākṛta). Skillful dharmas generate desirable and good outcomes, unskillful ones are the opposite. Non-defined dharmas are neither good nor bad.
- Saṃskṛta (conditioned, fabricated), or asaṃskṛta (unconditioned). According to the Mahāvibhāṣa, a dharma is conditioned "if it has arising and ceasing, cause and effect, and acquires the characteristics of the conditioned."
- Sāsrava (with āsravas, which are the "outflows" or mental impurities, a synonym for defilement) and anāsrava (without āsravas).
- Darśana-heya are sāsrava dharmas abandonable by vision (into the Four Noble Truths), bhāvanā-heya are sāsrava dharmas abandonable by cultivation of the Buddhist path, and aheya dharmas are anāsrava dharmas that are not to be abandoned.

=== Rūpa (matter) ===
Matter is that which is "subject to deterioration or disintegration." As Vasubandhu says, it is what "is repeatedly molested/broken" by contact. The main way of defining matter for Vaibhāṣikas is that it has two main distinctive natures: resistance (sa-pratighātatva), which is “the hindrance to the arising of another thing in its own location,” and visibility (sa-nidarśanatva), which allows one to locate matter since "it can be differently indicated as being here or being there" (Saṃghabhadra).

The primary material dharmas are the four Great Elements (mahābhūta, "Great Reals") — earth (pṛthivī), water (ap), fire (tejas), air (vāyu). All other dharmas are "derived matter" (upādāya-rūpa/bhautika) which arise on the basis of the Great Realities. According to Dhammajoti: "The four Great Elements exist inseparably from one another, being co-existent causes (sahabhū-hetu) one to another. Nevertheless, rūpa-dharmas are manifested and experienced in diverse forms because of the difference in intensity or substance of one or more of the four Elements."

Vaibhāṣika also had a theory of atoms. However, these atoms (paramāṇu) were not seen as eternally immutable or permanent and instead are seen as momentary. For Vaibhāṣika, an atom is the smallest unit of matter, which cannot be cut, broken up and has no parts. They come together (without touching each other) to form aggregations or "molecules". They held that this is "known through mental analysis".

=== Mind and mental factors ===
In Vaibhāṣika Abhidharma, the mind is a real entity, which is referred to by three mostly synonymous terms: ćitta, manas (thinking) and vijñāna (cognition), which are sometimes seen as different functional aspects of the mind. As defined by Dhammajoti, ćitta "is the general discernment or apprehension with respect to each individual object. This discernment is the mere grasping of the object itself, without apprehending any of its particularities." Saṃghabhadra defines it as what "grasps the characteristic of an object in a general manner."

Ćitta never arises by itself, it is always accompanied by certain mental factors or events (ćaittas or ćaitasikas), which are real and distinct dharmas that make a unique contribution to the mental process. Therefore, a moment of thought always has a specific nature and content. Ćittas and ćaittas always arise together simultaneously in mutually dependent relationships.

The doctrine which said that these two always arise and operate together is called "conjunction" (saṃprayoga). What conjunction meant was a disputed topic among the early masters. (Note: According to Dhammajoti: "For Vasumitra, saṃprayoga means mutually giving rise to each other and having the same basis (āśraya). For Dharmatrāta, it is companionship or association. The vijñāna and caittas are saṃprayukta only if they mutually accommodate each other, co-arise and take the same object. For Ghoṣaka, it refers to the sameness (samatā) of the citta and the caittas with regard to basis, object (ālambana), mode of activity (ākāra), and action (kriyā)." Dhammajoti 2009 p. 225.) Later, it came to be accepted that for ćitta and ćaittas to be conjoined, the following had to be true: both must be supported by the same basis (āśraya i.e. sense organ), they must have the same object (ālambana), mode of activity (ākāra), same time (kāla), and the same substance (dravya). This doctrine was repudiated by the Sautrāntika, who held that dharmas only arise successively, one after the other.

As seen in their list of dharmas, the Vaibhāṣikas classified ćaittas into various sub-categories based on various qualities. For example, the first classification, the universal dharmas (mahābhūmika), are so called because they exist in all types of ćitta. Then there are also universal good dharmas (kuśala mahābhūmikā) and universal defilements (kleśa).

One of the major controversies in Abhidharma Buddhism dealt with the question of the original nature of ćitta. Some, like the Mahāsāṃghika, held the view that it retains an originally pure nature. Vaibhāṣikas like Saṃghabhadra rejected this view, holding that the nature of ćitta can also be defiled.

=== Ćittaviprayuktasaṃskāras ===
Unlike other Abhidharma schools, the Vaibhāṣikas added another ultimate classification termed ćitta-viprayukta-saṃskāra, “conditionings (forces) disjoined from thought.” These "are real entities which are neither mental nor material in nature, which yet can operate on both domains" and can be seen as laws of nature. Dhammajoti notes however that the Abhidharma works of other schools like the *Śāriputrābhidharma also contain this category, just not as one of the main ultimate classifications. He also notes that there was never full agreement on how many dharmas are found in this category and that the Sautrāntikas did not accept their reality. Thus it was a much debated topic in northern Abhidharma traditions.

Perhaps the most important of these conditionings are acquisition (prāpti) and non-acquisition (aprāpti). Acquisition:

Is a force that links a dharma to a particular serial continuity (santati/santāna), i.e., the individual. Non-acquisition is another real entity whose function and nature are just opposed to those of acquisition: It acts to ensure that a given dharma is delinked from the individual serial continuity... It was at a relatively later stage that acquisition came to be defined generally as the dharma that effects the relation of any dharma to a living being (santāna).

These conditionings are particularly important because, due to their theory of tri-temporal existence, acquisition is central to the Vaibhāṣika understanding of defilement and purification. Since a defilement is a real dharma that exists always (sarvadā asti); it cannot be destroyed, however it can be de-linked from an individual by disrupting the acquisition-series. This also helps to explain how one can obtain a pure dharma such as nirvāṇa, since it is only through acquisition that one experiences nirvāṇa.

Another doctrinally important set of conditionings are "the four characteristics of the conditioned (saṃskṛta-lakṣaṇa)". Dharmas are said to have the production-characteristic (jāti-lakṣaṇa) which allows them to arise, the duration-characteristic (sthiti-lakṣaṇa) which is what enables it to temporarily remain and the decay-characteristic (jarā‑lakṣaṇa) which is the force which impairs its activity so that it can no longer continue projecting another distinct effect. A dharma also has the impermanence or disappearance characteristic (anityatā/vyayalakṣaṇa) which is what causes it to enter into the past.

=== Asaṃskṛta (the unconditioned) ===
Unconditioned dharmas are those which exist without being dependently co-arisen (pratītya-samutpanna), they are also not temporal or spatial. They transcend arising and ceasing, and are real existents that possess a unique efficacy (though not a temporal causal efficacy like other dharmas).

The Vaibhāṣika school taught three types of unconditioned dharmas: space (ākāśa), cessation through deliberation (pratisaṃkhyā-nirodha), and cessation independent of deliberation (apratisaṃkhyā-nirodha).

In the MVŚ, some disagreement among Sarvāstivāda masters regarding these dharmas can be seen. Some like "the Bhadanta" (Dharmatrāta) denied the reality of space. Meanwhile, Dārṣṭāntikas denied the ontological reality of all three.

According to Dhammajoti, cessation through deliberation refers to "the cessation of defilements acquired through the process of discriminative or deliberative effort." There are just as many of these cessations as there are with-outflow dharmas. Cessation independent of deliberation meanwhile "are those acquired simply on account of the deficiency in the required assemblage of conditions for the particular dharma‑s. They are so called because they are independent of any deliberative effort." There are as many of these cessations are there are conditioned dharmas.

Cessation through deliberation is also the technical term for the Buddhist goal of nirvāṇa, which is also defined as "a disjunction (visaṃyoga) from with-outflow dharma‑s acquired through the process of discrimination/deliberation (pratisaṃkhyāna) which is a specific outflow-free prajñā." Nirvāṇa is the absolute absence of karma and the defilements, the escape from the skandhas and all saṃsāric existence which attained by an arhat.

==== Nirvāṇa's real existence ====
In Sarvāstivāda, nirvāṇa is a "distinct positive entity" (dravyāntara). It is "an ontologically real force that is acquired by the practitioner when a given defilement is completely abandoned." This force ensures that the defilement's acquisition will never arise again. Master Skandhila's definition indicates how this real entity has a positive presence, which is said to be "like a dike holding back the water or a screen blocking the wind."

Vaibhāṣika holds that the real existence of nirvāṇa is supported both by direct perception and by scripture which depict the Buddha stating that "There is definitely the unborn." Sautrāntikas disagree with this interpretation of scripture, holding that the unborn simply refers to the discontinuity of birth (janmāpravṛtti), and thus it is a mere concept referring to the absence of suffering due to the abandoning of the defilements and thus it is only relatively real (prajñaptisat). However, Saṃghabhadra argues that "It is only when the unborn is conceded to be a distinct real entity that it is meaningful to say 'There is.' Besides, if there were no such entity, the Buddha should have simply said 'There is the discontinuity of the born.'"

According to Vaibhāṣika, nirvāṇa must be an ultimately real existent because no real supporting phenomena can be found which could serve as the basis on which to designate nirvāṇa as a relative existent (as the aggregates serve to designate the self as relative, for example). Also, if nirvāṇa is not a real force, then beings could not give rise to delight in nirvāṇa and disgust towards saṃsāra, for nirvāṇa would be inferior in terms of existence. It would also mean that the Buddha had been deluding everyone by speaking of non-existents in the same way that he spoke of the existents.

Furthermore, if nirvāṇa was unreal, it could not be one of the four noble truths, since a non-existent cannot be said to be true or false. An ārya is said to directly see the four truths, including the third truth of duḥkhanirodha (the end of suffering, i.e. nirvāṇa) and wisdom cannot arise with regard to a non-existent object.

== Time and Ontology ==
=== Existence ===
The name Sarvāstivāda literally means "all exists" (sarvām asti), referring to their doctrine that all dharmas, past present and future, exist. This doctrine of tri-temporal existence has been described as an eternalist theory of time.

What does it mean for a dharma to exist? For the Sarvāstivāda Abhidharmikas, the main reasons that something is real or existent is causal efficacy and the fact that it abides in its own nature (svabhāva). The Vaibhāṣika philosopher Saṃghabhadra defines an existent as follows: "The characteristic of a real existent is that it serves as an object-domain for generating cognition (buddhi)." Each cognition is intentional and it has a distinctive character which is caused by the intrinsic characteristic (svalakṣaṇa) of the object of cognition. If there is no object of cognition (viṣaya), there is no cognition. (Note: Saṃghabhadra elucidates this notion as follows: Cognition (buddhi) is vis-à-vis the cognized, for cognition can only be accomplished where a cognitive object exists. That is to say, a cognition is so called only when its object (viṣaya) can be apperceived (upa-labh). If the apperceived does not exist, of what is that which apperceives? (I.e., it is an apperception of what?). Moreover, the intrinsic nature of consciousness is the discerning of an object; if the object of consciousness does not exist, what does consciousness discern? Hence, the consciousness of a non-existent object conceded by the [Sautrāntika] ought not to be called consciousness, since there is nothing to discern. A non-existent is an absolute non-entity and necessarily without (lit., ‘going beyond’ — 越) an intrinsic characteristic and common characteristics (sāmānya-lakṣaṇa), what is it that is said to be the object of cognition or consciousness? Should one say that non-existence itself is the object of consciousness — no, for a consciousness necessarily has an object. That is: All mental elements (citta-caitta-dharmas) have intrinsic and common characteristics as their objects; it is not the case that an absolutely non-existent dharma arises as an object. Dhammajoti 2009 pp. 72–73.)

Furthermore, according to Saṃghabhadra, only if there are true existent forms can there be a difference between correct and incorrect cognitions regarding material things.

Saṃghabhadra further adds that they are of two types of existents:

What exists truly (dravyato’sti) and what exists conceptually (prajñaptito’sti), the two being designated on the basis of conventional truth and absolute truth. If, with regard to a thing, a cognition (buddhi) is produced without depending on anything else, this thing exists truly — e.g., rūpa, vedanā, etc. If it depends on other things to produce a cognition, then it exists conceptually/relatively — e.g., a vase, army, etc.

Furthermore, things that truly exist are also of two types: those things that just have their own nature and those things that have both their own nature and also have activities (kāritra). Additionally, this last type is divided into two: "with or without function (sāmarthya/vyāpara/śakti)". Lastly, relative existents are also of two types, "having existence on the basis of something real or on something relative, like a vase and an army, respectively."

=== Arguments in favor of temporal eternalism ===
According to Jan Westerhoff, one reason they had for holding this theory was that moments of consciousness are intentional (are directed, "about something") and thus if there are no past entities which exist, thoughts about them would be objectless and could not exist. Another argument is that to account for past actions (karma) which have effects at a later time. If an act of karma no longer exists, it is difficult, argues the Vaibhāṣika, to see how they can have fruits in the present or future. Finally, past, present and future are mutually interdependent ideas. If past and future are non-existent, argued the Vaibhāṣikas, how can one make sense of the existence of the present?

In the Samyukta-abhidharma-hrdaya, a fourth century Gandharan Sarvāstivāda text, the core Sarvāstivāda theory is defended thus:

"If there were no past and future, then there would be no present period of time; if there were no present period of time, there would also be no conditioned factors (samskrta dharma). That is why there are the three periods of time (trikala). Do not state that there is a mistake. When stating that [the fact that] what is remote is past and that what will exist is future, does not exist, and that there only is the present, this is not right. Why? Because there is retribution (vipaka) of action. The World-honored One has been saying: "There is action and there is retribution." It is not the case that this action and retribution are both present. When action is present, it should be known that retribution is future; when retribution is present, it should be known that action is already past. [ ... ] As has been said: "If there are no such five faculties as faith (sraddhendriya), I say that this is the generation of worldlings (prthagjana)." When the seeker (saiksa) is the one who is bound by envelopers (paryavasthana), such five faculties as faith are not present; because the path is not together with defilement (kleśa). That is why it should be known that there is past and future. If it were different, noble persons (aryapudgala) would have to be worldlings."

Vasubandhu outlines the main arguments based on scripture and reason for all exists as follows:

- a. For, it has been said by the Buddha: “O bhikṣus, if past rūpa did not exist, the learned noble disciple could not have become disgusted with regard to the past rūpa. It is because past rūpa exists that the learned noble disciple becomes disgusted with regard to the past rūpa. If future rūpa did not exist, the learned noble disciple could not have become free from delight with regard to the future rūpa. It is because future rūpa exists that…”
- b. It has been said by the Buddha, “Conditioned by the two [— sense organ and the object —], there is the arising of consciousness…”
- c. Consciousness arises when there is an object, not when there is no object. This is a fixed principle. If past and future [dharmas] were non-existent, there would be a consciousness having a non-existent object. Hence, in the absence of an object, consciousness itself would not exist.
- d. If past [dharmas] were non-existent, how could there be in the future the fruit of pure or impure karma? For it is not the case that at the time of the arising of the fruit a present retribution-cause exists!

=== Temporality ===
Regarding time (adhvan), for Vaibhāṣikas, it is just a superimposition on the activity of these different types of dharmas and does not exist independently. Because of this, there was a need to explain how one experiences time and change. Among the different Sarvāstivāda thinkers, there were different ideas on how dharmas change so as to give rise to the experience of time. The Mahāvibhāṣa (MVŚ) speaks of four major theories which attempt to do this:

- The theory which says there is a change in mode of being (bhāva-anyathātva).
- The theory which says there is a change in characteristic (lakṣaṇa-anyathātva).
- The theory which says there is a change in state or condition (avasthā-anyathātva).
- The theory which says there is a change in [temporal] relativity (anyathā-anyathātva).

The positions are further outlined by Vasubandhu as follows:

1. "The Bhadanta Dharmatrata defends change in mode of being, that is, he affirms that the three time periods, past, present, and future, are differentiated by their non-identity of existence (bhava). When a dharma goes from one time period to another its nature is not modified, but its existence is."
2. "The Bhadanta Ghosaka defends change in characteristic, that is, the time periods differ through the difference in their characteristics. A dharma goes through the time periods. When it is past, it is endowed with past characteristics (laksana), but it is not deprived of its present and future characteristics..." [and so on with present and future].
3. "The Bhadanta Vasumitra defends change in state/condition, that is, the time periods differ through the difference of condition (avastha). A dharma, going through the time periods, having taken up a certain condition, becomes different through the difference of its condition, not through a difference in its substance. Example: a token placed on the square of ones, is called one; placed on the square of tens, ten; and placed on the square of hundreds, one hundred."
4. "The Bhadanta Buddhadeva defends change in [temporal] relativity, that is, the time periods are established through their mutual relationships. A dharma, going throughout the time periods, takes different names through different relationships, that is, it is called past, future, or present, through a relationship with what precedes and with what follows. For example, the same woman is both a daughter and a mother."

In the Abhidharmakośa, Vasubandhu argues that: "The best system is that of Vasumitra." The Samyukta-abhidharma-hrdaya agrees.

Later Sarvāstivāda developed a combination of the first and third views. This can be seen in Saṃghabhadra, who argues that while a dharma's essential nature does not change, its function or activity (kāritra) and its existence (bhāva) changes:

The essential nature of a dharma remains eternally; its bhāva [existence] changes: When a saṃskṛta [conditioned] dharma traverses through adhvan [time], it gives rise to its kāritra [activity] in accordance with the pratyayas [conditions], without abandoning its substantial nature; immediately after this, the kāritra produced ceases. Hence it is said that the svabhāva exists eternally and yet it is not permanent, since its bhāva changes.

Thus, for Saṃghabhadra, "a dharma is present when it exercises its kāritra, future when its kāritra is not yet exercised, past when it has been exercised." The term kāritra is defined as "a dharma’s capability of inducing the production of its own next moment". When the right set of conditions come together, a dharma becomes endowed with activity (which vanishes in a single moment). When it does not have activity, a dharma's own nature still has the capacity to causally contribute to other dharmas.

=== Svabhāva in time ===
Regarding the essential nature (svabhāva) or reality (dravya) of a dharma, all Vaibhāṣika thinkers agreed that it is what remains constant and does not change as a dharma moves throughout the three times. However, as noted by Dhammajoti, this does not necessarily mean that a dharma's svabhāva "is immutable or even permanent, for a dharma’s mode of existence and its essential nature are not different, so that when the former is undergoing transformation, so is its svabhāva."

From the Vaibhāṣika perspective this is not a contradiction, since it is the same process that remains (even while changing) throughout time. Thus, in this particular sense, there is no change in the svabhāva or svalakṣaṇa. This is said to be the case even though a dharma is always being transformed into different modes of being. Each of these is actually a new occasion or event in a causal stream (though it is not different in terms of its nature than previous dharmas in that stream). Thus according to Dhammajoti, there is a way in which the essential natures are transformed, and yet, one can say that they remain the same ontologically. Dharmatrāta used the example of a piece of gold that is transformed into different things (cups, bowl, etc). While there are different entities, the essential nature of gold remains the same.

This perspective is expressed by Saṃghabhadra who argues that svabhāva is not permanent since it goes through time and its existence (bhāva) varies through time. Saṃghabhadra also notes that a dharma is produced by various causes (and is part of a causal web which has no beginning), and once a dharma has ceased, it does not arise again. However, for Saṃghabhadra, one can still say that dharmas do not lose their svabhāva. He uses the example of vedanās (sensation). Even though we speak of various modes of sensation, all the types of sensation in a person's mindstream have the same nature of being sensitive phenomena (prasāda rūpa). Saṃghabhadra then states:

It is not the case that since the function is different from the existence, that there can be the difference in the functions of seeing, hearing, etc. Rather, the very function of seeing, etc., is none other than the existence of the eye, etc. On account of the difference in function, there is definitely the difference in the mode of existence… Since it is observed that there are dharmas that co-exist as essential substances and whose essential characteristics do not differ but that [nevertheless] have different modes of existence, we know that when dharma‑s traverse the three times, their modes of existence vary while their essential characteristics do not change.

He also states:

[Our explanations] also have properly refuted the objection that [our theory of sarvāstitva] implies the permanence of [a dharma’s] essential nature, for, while the essential nature remains always [the same], its avasthā [condition] differs [in the stages of time] since there is change. This difference of avasthā is produced on account of conditions and necessarily stays no more than one kṣaṇa [moment]. Accordingly, the essential nature of the dharma too is impermanent, since it is not distinct from the difference [that arises in it]. [But] it is only in an existent dharma that changes can obtain; there cannot be change in a non-existent. In this way, therefore, we have properly established the times.

According to Dhammajoti, what the Vaibhāṣikas had in mind with this view was that even though the different dharmas in a causal series are different entities, there is an overall "individuality or integrity", and the series thus remains "dynamically identical". This is a relationship of identity-in-difference (bhedābheda). In this sense, a svabhāva is not a static entity, it is impermanent and undergoes change and yet "ontologically it never becomes a totally different substance." Saṃghabhadra claimed that it is only when understood in this way that the doctrine of "all exists" is logically compatible with the doctrine of impermanence.

=== Momentariness ===
Orthodox Sarvāstivāda also defended the theory of moments (kṣaṇavāda). This doctrine held that dharmas last only for a moment, this measure of time is the smallest measure of time possible, it is described in the Samyukta-abhidharma-hrdaya as:

The smallest [period of] time is one kṣaṇa. Time is extremely small with one instant. That is why a kṣaṇa is said to be the limitation in time. Concerning the measure of a kṣaṇa, some say that it is as a powerful man who, looking around hurriedly, observes the multitude of stars: according to the going of time, one star is one kṣaṇa. Moreover, some say that it is as a powerful man who, during a long time, snaps with the fingers: sixty-four kṣaṇas pass! Moreover, some say that it is as a powerful man who cuts thin silk thread of Kasi with a very sharp knife: cutting one thread is one kṣaṇa. Moreover, some say that the World-honored One did not pronounce [the word] kṣaṇa."

== Theory of Causality ==
An important topic covered in Vaibhāṣika Abhidharma was the investigation of causes, conditions and their effects. Vaibhāṣikas used two major schemes to explain causality: the four conditions (pratyaya) and the six causes (hetu). In this system, the arising of dharmas is totally dependent on specific causes. Causal force is what makes a dharma real and thus they are also called saṃskāras (conditioning forces). Because of this, all dharmas belong to some kind of causal category, and are said to have causal efficacy. Indeed, it is only through examining their causes that the intrinsic nature manifests in a cognisable way. In the Vaibhāṣika system, the activities of dharmas arises through the mutual interdependence of causes. Thus, their intrinsic natures are said to be "feeble", which means they are not able to act on their own, and their activity is dependent on other dharmas.

A particularly unique feature of the Vaibhāṣika system is their acceptance of simultaneous causation. These "co-existent causes" are an important part of the Sarvāstivāda understanding of causality. It allowed them to explain their theory of direct realism, that is to say, their affirmation that we perceive real external objects. It also was used in their defense of temporal eternalism. Thus, it was central to their understanding of cause and effect. For thinkers like Saṃghabhadra, a sense organ and its object must exist at the same moment together with its effect, the perception. Thus, for a cause to be efficacious, it must exist together with its effect. This view of simultaneous causation was rejected by the Sautrāntikas, but later adopted by the Yogācāra school.

=== The Six Causes ===
- Efficient cause (kāraṇa-hetu). According to Dhammajoti, "It is any dharma that either directly or indirectly — by not hindering — contributes to the arising of another dharma." Vasubandhu defines it as: "A conditioned dharma has all dharma‑s, excepting itself, as its efficient cause, for, as regards its arising, [these dharma‑s] abide in the state of non-obstructiveness." This is type of cause is rejected by Sautrāntikas like Śrīlāta.
- Homogeneous cause (sabhāga-hetu). This refers to the kind of causality in which an effect is of the same moral type as the previous cause in a series. Thus, in the series c1 → c2 → c3, if c1 is skillful, it is the homogeneous cause for c2 which is also skillful, and so on. According to Vaibhāṣika, this form of causality exists among mental and material dharmas, but Sautrāntikas deny that it can apply to material dharmas.
- Universal cause (sarvatraga-hetu). This is similar to the homogeneous cause in that it is a cause that produces the same kind of effect, however, it only applies to defiled dharmas. Another way it is distinct from the homogeneous is that there is "no necessary homogeneity in terms of category of abandonability". This is because, as Saṃghabhadra says in the Nyāyānusāra, "they are the cause of [defiled dharma‑s] belonging to other categories as well, for, through their power, defilements belonging to categories different from theirs are produced."
- Retribution cause (vipāka-hetu). This is the skill or unskillful dharmas that are karmic causes, and thus lead to good or bad karmic retribution. For Vaibhāṣikas, retribution causes and their fruits comprise all five aggregates. Sautrāntikas held that retribution cause is only volition (cetanā), and retribution fruit comprises only sensation (vedanā).
- Co-existent cause (sahabhū-hetu). This is a new causal category developed by Sarvāstivāda. The Mahāvibhāṣa states that the intrinsic nature of the co-existent cause is "all the conditioned dharma‑s". Saṃghabhadra's Nyāyānusāra states that this refers to those causes "that are reciprocally virile effects, on account of the fact that they can arise by virtue of mutual support… For example: the four Great Elements are co-existent cause mutually among themselves … for it is only when the four different kinds of Great Elements assemble together that they can be efficacious in producing the derived matter (upādāya rūpa)... In this way, the whole of the conditioned, where applicable (i.e., where a mutual causal relationship obtains) are co‑existent causes." Another sense in which they are co-existent is because they come together to produce a common effect, they function together as causes at the time of the arising of a dharma.
- Conjoined cause (saṃprayuktaka-hetu). This refers to co-existent causes in the mental domain of ćitta-ćaittas. According to Saṃghabhadra: "This [conjoined] cause is established because thought and thought concomitants, being conjoined, accomplish the same deed by grasping the same object."

=== The Four Conditions ===
Saṃghabhadra argues that even though the arising of dharmas depends on numerous conditions, the Buddha taught only four conditions in the sūtras. Against the Sautrāntikas, who held that these were mere conceptual designations, Vaibhāṣikas assert that they are real existents.

The four conditions are first found in Devaśarman’s Vijñānakāya (c. 1st century CE) and they are:

- Condition qua cause (hetu-pratyaya). According to Dhammajoti, "This is the condition in its capacity as direct cause in the production of an effect — it is the cause functioning as the condition." This condition subsumes all causes, except the efficient cause.
- Equal-immediate condition (samanantara-pratyaya). This refers to a mental process (a ćitta or ćaitta) that is a condition for the arising of the next mental process. Dhammajoti: "It both gives way to and induces the arising of the next citta-caitta in the series." For Vaibhāṣikas, this does not apply to matter, but Sautrāntikas argued that it does.
- Condition qua object (ālambana-pratyaya). This refers to the fact that cognition cannot arise without an object and thus "in this sense, the object serves as a condition for the cognition." Since the mind can take any object, "the condition qua object is none otherthan the totality of dharmas" (Saṃghabhadra).
- Condition of dominance (adhipati-pratyaya). Dhammajoti defines it thus: "This is the most comprehensive or generic condition, corresponding to efficient cause: It is whatever serves as a condition, either in the sense of directly contributing to the arising of a dharma, or indirectly through not hindering its arising. From the latter perspective, the unconditioned dharmas — although transcending space and time altogether — are also said to serve as conditions of dominance."

=== Five Fruits ===
The Sarvāstivāda also taught that there are five fruits i.e. causal effects:

- Disconnection fruit (visaṃyoga-phala). This refers to disconnection from the defilements, and is acquired through the practice of the noble path which leads to the acquisition of the dharma "cessation through deliberation" (pratisaṃkhyā-nirodha).
- Virile fruit (puruṣakāra-phala). This is related to the co-existent cause and the conjoined cause. According to Vasubandhu it is "That which is the activity or efficacy (kāritra) of a dharma; [so called] because it is like a virile action."
- Fruit of dominance (adhipati-phala). This is the most generic fruit, they are produced by efficient causes. According to Dhammajoti, "the fruits commonly shared by a collection of beings by virtue of their collective karmas belong to this category. Thus, the whole universe with all its planets, mountains and oceans, etc., is the result — the fruit of dominance — of the collective karmas of the totality of beings inhabiting therein."
- Uniform-emanation fruit (niṣyanda-phala). This is a fruit issued from a cause of a similar nature, it is correlated to the homogeneous cause and the universal cause.
- Retribution fruit (vipāka-phala). This fruit only deals with individual sentient beings (sattvākhya), and is correlated with the retribution cause.

== Epistemology ==
The Vaibhāṣika epistemology defended a form of realism that is established through experience. Their theory of knowledge held that one could know dharmas as unique forces with unique characteristics by two means of knowledge (pramāṇa): direct perception (which includes spiritual vision) or inference (anumāna), which relies on direct experience.

For Vaibhāṣikas like Saṃghabhadra “the characteristic of an existent (sal-lakṣaṇa) is that it can serve as an object producing cognition (buddhi).” Because of this, an object of knowledge is necessarily existent, though it can be either a true existent (dravyata) or a conceptual existent (prajñapti). As Dhammajoti notes, "the possibility of knowing an object necessarily implies the true ontological status of the object."

This view was rejected by Sautrāntikas like Śrīlāta, who argued that a cognitive object could be unreal, pointing to examples such as optical illusions, dreams, the false cognition of a self or really existent person (pudgala), and so on. The Vaibhāṣika response to this is that even in the case of such mistaken cognitive constructs, there is a real basis which acts as part of the causal process. As explained by Dhammajoti:

An absolute non-existent (atyantam asad) has no function whatsoever and hence can never engender a consciousness. Thus, in the case of the perception of the unreal pudgala, the perceptual object is not the pudgala which is superimposed, but the five skandhas which are real existents.

Furthermore, as noted by Dhammajoti: "sensory perception as a pratyakṣa experience is fully accomplished only in the second moment on recollection." This is because the external object must first be experienced by "direct perception supported by a sense faculty" (indriyāśrita-pratyakṣa) before a discerning perception (buddhi-pratyakṣa) can arise, since the discerning perception uses the previous sense faculty perception as a cognitive support (ālambana).

Vaibhāṣika defended the real existence of external objects by arguing that mental defilements arise in different ways because of the causal force of the mind's intentional object. Likewise, sensory perception (pratyakṣa) is said to arise due to various causes and conditions, one of which is a real external object. According to Dhammajoti, for Vaibhāṣikas like Saṃghabhadra, "a sensory consciousness necessarily takes a physical assemblage or agglomeration of atoms (he ji 和集; *saṃcaya, *saṃghāta, *samasta). What is directly perceived is just these atoms assembled together in a certain manner, not a conceptualised object such as a jug, etc."

For Vaibhāṣika knowledge (jñāna) is a ćaitta (mental factor) that has the distinguishing characteristic of being "understanding that is decisive or definite (niścita)." There are various kinds of knowledge, for example, dharma-knowledge (dharma-jñāna), is the knowledge that realises the true nature of dharmas, conventional-knowledge (saṃvṛti-jñāna) deals with conventional (not ultimate) things and knowledge of non-arising (anutpāda-jñāna) refers to the knowledge one has when one knows nirvāṇa has been achieved.

== Defilement (kleśa) ==
The goal of Buddhism is often seen as the freedom from suffering which arises from the complete removal of all defilements (kleśa). This is a state of perfection that is known by an arhat or Buddha through the "knowledge of the destruction of the outflows" (āsravakṣaya-jñāna). Ābhidharmikas saw the Abhidharma itself, which in the highest sense is just wisdom (prajñā), as the only means to end the defilements.

Kleśa is commonly defined as that which "soils" or defiles as well as that which disturbs and afflicts a psycho-physical series. Another important synonym for defilement is anuśaya, which is explained by Vaibhāṣikas as a subtle or fine (aṇu) dharma that adheres and grows with an object, "like the adherence of dust on a wet garment or the growth of seeds in an irrigated field." This is in contrast to other interpretations of anuśaya, such as that of the Sautrāntikas, who saw them as "seeds" (bīja) of kleśas. Thus, for Vaibhāṣikas there is no such thing as a latent defilement.

The defilements are seen as the root of existence (mūlaṃ bhavasya), since they produce karma, which in turn leads to further rebirths. The most fundamental defilements are known as the three unskillful roots (akuśala-mūla), referring to greed (rāga), hostility (pratigha) and ignorance (avidyā). Out of these, ignorance is the most fundamental of all. It is defined by Saṃghabhadra as "a distinct dharma which harms the capability of understanding (prajñā). It is the cause of topsy-turvy views and obstructs the examination of merits and faults. With regard to dharmas to be known it operates in the mode of disinclination, veiling the thought and thoughtconcomitants."

According to Dhammajoti, other major terms used to describe defilements are: 1. fetter (saṃyojana); 2. bondage (bandhana); 3. envelopment (paryavasthāna); 4. outflow (āsrava); 5. flood (ogha); 6. yoke (yoga); 7. clinging (upādāna); 8. corporeal tie (kāya-grantha); 9. hindrance (nivaraṇa). These numerous categories are used to describe various doctrinal topics and create a taxonomy of dharmas. For example, all dharmas are either with or without outflows (āsrava), which are dharmas that keep sentient beings flowing on through existence and also cause impurities to flow through the sense fields.

These are also further divided into sub-categories. For example, there are three āsrava types: sensuality-outflow (kāmāsrava), existence-outflow (bhavāsrava) and ignorance-outflow (avidyāsrava); there are four clingings: sensuality-clinging (kāmopādāna), view-clinging (dṛṣṭy-upādāna), clinging to abstentions and vows (śīlavratopādāna), and soul-theory-clinging (ātmavādopādāna); and there are five hindrances: (i) sensual-desire, (ii) malice, (iii) torpor-drowsiness (styāna-middha), (iv) restlessness-remorse (auddhatyakaukṛtya), and (v) doubt.

For Vaibhāṣikas, the elimination of the defilements thus begins with an investigation into the nature of dharmas (dharma-pravicaya). This examination is carried out in various ways, such as investigating how defilements arise and grow, what its cognitive objects are, and whether a defilement is to be abandoned by insight into the four noble truths (darśanapraheya) or by cultivation (bhāvanāpraheya).

In the Vaibhāṣika system, the abandonment of a defilement is not the complete destruction of it, since all dharmas exist throughout the three times. Instead, one becomes defiled when the dharma of acquisition links one with the defilement (saṃyoga), and one abandons the defilement when there is both the ceasing of the dharma of acquisition as well as the arising of the acquisition of disconnection (visaṃyoga-prāpti). While the abandonment of a dharma happens at once and is not repeated, the acquisition of disconnection can take place over and over again, reflecting deeper and firmer spiritual progress.

This is important because as Dhammajoti notes, Vaibhāṣikas affirm that "freedom from duḥkha must be gained by gradually and systematically abandoning the defilements" and reject the view that awakening happens abruptly. There are four methods of abandoning a defilement, the first three deal with abandonment by insight (darśana-heya):

1. ālambana-parijñāna: Complete understanding of the nature of the object due to which the defilement arises.
2. tadālambana-saṃkṣaya: The destruction of a defilement which is the object of another defilement along with the destruction of the latter (the subject).
3. ālambana-prahāṇa: The abandonment of a defilement that takes as object another defilement by abandoning the latter — the object.
4. pratipakṣodaya: The abandonment of a defilement on account of the arising of its counteragent. This is specifically applied to the defilements that are abandoned by cultivation (bhāvanā-heya).

== Karma ==
While the Vaibhāṣikas acknowledge the profound and ultimately inconceivable nature of karma, they still attempted to give a rational account of its basic workings and to show how it was a middle way between determinism and absolute freedom. The Mahāvibhāṣa (MVŚ) notes that there are different but related ways in which the term karma is used. It can refer to actions in a general sense and it can refer specifically to ethical actions which have desirable or undesirable effects.

Karma is also used to refer to the actual retribution causes (vipāka‑hetu) of actions, which according to Dhammajoti, play a crucial role "in determining the various spheres (dhātu), planes (gati) and modes of birth (yoni) of a sentient being’s existence and in differentiating the various types of persons (pudgala) with their various life-span, physical appearances, social status, etc."

Karma is not the only contributing factor to rebirth, as Vasubandhu states: "It is not karma alone which is the projector of a birth (janman)." Karma is also related to the defilements since the defilements act as the generating cause and supporting condition for karma.

=== Classifications ===
There are three main types of karma: bodily, vocal and mental. Out of all the different elements of karma, it is the volitional aspect (abhisaṃ-kṛ, cetanā), which comprises all mental karma, that is the most central and fundamental, since it originates and assists the other types of karma. Saṃghabhadra, citing the sūtras, states that volition (i.e. mental karma) is karma "in the proper or specific sense inasmuch as it is the prominent cause (*viśiṣṭa-hetu) in projecting a sentient existence."

The Vaibhāṣikas also had further classifications of the different types of karma. For example, there are:

- Volitional karma (cetanā) and karma subsequent to willing (cetayitvā).
- Informative (vijñapti) and non‑informative (avijñapti) karma. This refers to bodily and vocal actions which inform others of the corresponding mental state.
- Skillful (kuśala), unskillful (akuśala) and morally neutral (avyākṛta) karmas.
- Karmas which are with-outflow (sāsrava) and outflow-free (anāsrava) karmas.
- Determinate (niyata) and indeterminate (aniyata) karma.
- Karma that is done (kṛta) and karma that is accumulated (upacita).
- Projecting (ākṣepaka) and completing (paripūraka) karmas.

The informative and non-informative category is particularly important. For the Vaibhāṣika, both types are real entities and are included as cetayitvā karma. Also, the nature of informative karma is material, it is the specific bodily shape at the time of the accomplishment of an action (which includes sound). Saṃghabhadra defends this by arguing that if all karma is mere volition (as held by Sautrāntika), then as soon as one has the intention to kill, this is the same as committing the deed. Vaibhāṣikas also held that non-informative karma was a kind of subtle "non-resistant" matter which preserved karmic efficacy, a view that was vigorously attacked by the Sautrāntikas.

Like other Buddhist schools, the Vaibhāṣikas taught the ten paths of karma as a major ethical guide to what should be avoided and what should be cultivated. It should be emphasised that volition remains the core of this teaching, that is, even if one avoids acting on one's harmful intentions, the intention itself remains an unskillful karma.

=== Karma through time ===
The Vaibhāṣika theory of karma is also closely related to their theory of tri-temporal existence, since karmas also exist in the past and in the future. Indeed, the efficacy of past karma is part of their argument for "all exists", since, for the Vaibhāṣika, if a past karmic retributive cause ceases to exist completely, it cannot lead to the karmic effect or fruit. As Dhammajoti explains:

At the very moment when a retributive cause arises, it determines the causal connection with the fruit-to-be; i.e., ‘it grasps the fruit.’ At a subsequent time, when the necessary conditions obtain, it, although past, can causally actualize the fruit by dragging it, as it were, out of the future into the present; i.e., ‘it gives the fruit.’

This was of course rejected by the Sautrāntikas, who posited a competing theory, known as the theory of seeds, which held that a volition creates a chain of momentary dharmas called seeds, which are continuously transmitted in the mind stream until they sprout, producing the karmic effect.

Saṃghabhadra critiques this theory by pointing out that when a seed turns into a plant, there is no interruption in the process. But in the Sautrāntika view, there can be an interruption, as when a person has thoughts of a different ethical type or when they enter into meditations that completely interrupt mental activity (such as asaṃjñi-samāpatti or nirodha-samāpatti). And since Sautrāntikas are presentists, the past karma has also ceased to exist at this point and thus cannot be a cause for its fruit.

=== Karmic retribution ===
In Vaibhāṣika Abhidharma, the nature of karmic retribution, i.e. how a person experiences the results of their actions, is not fixed and depends on different conditions, such as the spiritual status and wisdom of the person. (Note: Vasubandhu's AKB has the following stanza: The ignorant, committing even a small evil goes below. The wise, although committing a great one, leaves behind the bad [abodes]. A compacted [piece of] iron, although small, sinks into water; The same made into a bowl, although great, floats. Dhammajoti 2009 p. 409.) There are six factors that effect the gravity of karmic retribution (and subsequently, how bad one's future rebirth is):

1. The actions performed after the major karmic act.
2. The status of the ‘field’ (kṣetra-viśeṣa), referring to the ethical and spiritual status of the person.
3. The basis (adhiṣṭhāna), which is the act itself.
4. The preparatory action (prayoga) leading up to the main act.
5. Volition (cetanā), the intentional mental force behind the act.
6. The strength of the intention (āśaya-viśeṣa).

There are also said to be some karmas that may or may not lead to retribution at all, these are indeterminate (aniyata) karmas which are contrasted with determinate karmas, i.e. those that necessarily cause retribution (whether in this life, in the next or in some further life). These indeterminate karmas can be rendered weak or fruitless through the practice of the spiritual path. The "Salt Cristal Sūtra" (Loṇaphala Sutta) is cited in support of this. Determinate karmas are particularly dark acts, such as killing one's parents, which cannot be so transformed.

Another important distinction here is that between karma that is done (kṛta) which refers to preparatory and principal actions, and karma that is accumulated (upacita) which refers to the consecutive actions which "complete" the action. For example, one may prepare to kill someone and attempt to do so, but fail. In this sense, the action is not accumulated. Also, an action not done intentionally is not accumulated. Though the preparation is still a bad karma, it is not necessarily retributive. If however, something willed and accomplished is necessarily retributive.

Yet another key distinction is that between projecting (ākṣepaka) and completing (paripūraka) karmas. A projecting karma is a single act which is the principal cause that projects one's future existence (as well as for the intermediate existence, the antarā-bhava), while completing karmas are responsible for specific experiences within that one existence, such as lifespan.

Finally, in this system, karma is primarily individual. That is to say, one person's karma will not cause a retribution fruit to be experienced by another person.

However, there is a karmic fruit which is experienced by a collective of individuals, which is the fruit of dominance (adhipati-phala), which affects the vitality and durability of external things, such as plants and planets. This is used to explain how, when persons do good actions, the external world is affected by the "four increases": "of lifespan, of sentient beings, of external items of utility and enjoyment (pariṣkāra), and of skillful dharmas". In this sense then, there is "collective karma." Thus, for the Vaibhāṣikas, the whole universe is the collective karma (i.e. the fruit of dominance) of all beings living in it.

== Dependent Origination ==
The Sarvāstivāda Abhidharma interpretation of the key Buddhist doctrine of Dependent Origination (pratītya-samutpāda) focuses on how the 12 links (nidāna) contribute to rebirth from the perspective of three periods of existence (past, present, future). This is explained in the following way:

- Past causes
  - 1. ignorance (avidyā), represents all the defilements in one's past life, since all defilements are conjoined with and caused by ignorance.
  - 2. conditionings (saṃskāra), this refers to all past karmic constructions driven by ignorance.
- Present effects
  - 3. consciousness (vijñāna), this specifically refers to the consciousness that enters the womb at the moment of rebirth.
  - 4. psycho-physical complex (nāma-rūpa), represents the body and mind, particularly as it develops in the womb.
  - 5. six sense fields (ṣaḍāyatana), refers to the five senses and the mental sense.
  - 6. contact (sparśa), refers to contact between the sense faculties and their objects.
  - 7. sensation (vedanā), refers to different pleasant, unpleasant and neutral sensations.
- Present causes
  - 8. craving (tṛṣṇā), refers to craving for sensuality, desire for material things and sex.
  - 9. grasping (upādāna), strong clinging for the objects of craving.
  - 10. existence (bhava), refers to all present karmas that project a future existence.
- Future effects
  - 11. birth (jāti), represents the first re-linking consciousness in a future birth.
  - 12. old-age-and-death (jarā-maraṇa), represents everything that happens from future rebirth until death.

Though presented in a linear way in the form of a list, these factors are said to be mutually conditioning among each other in various interconnected ways.

Though the three life model, also called "prolonged" (prākarṣika), is the most widely used way of understanding dependent origination, Sarvāstivāda Abhidharmikas also accepted three other ways of explaining it:

- Momentary (kṣaṇika): the 12 links are explained as being present within a single mind moment.
- Pertaining to states (āvasthika): This model states that the five aggregates are present in each of the 12 links. Each link is so named because it is the predominant force among the aggregates at that moment, and thus the entire collection of aggregates is given the name ignorance (and so on) at that point in time.
- Connected (sāṃbandhika): Refers to how the 12 links are conjoined with the entire field of causes and effects, i.e. "all conditioned dharmas" or the whole of phenomenal existence.

== Spiritual path ==
The study of the nature and function of spiritual paths is important to Abhidharma. For the Vaibhāṣikas the spiritual path is a gradual process of abandoning the defilements; there is no "sudden enlightenment". The analysis of the various spiritual paths provided by the Vaibhāṣika Abhidharma correspond to the abandoning of various defilements.

The beginning of the path consists of preliminary practices: approaching "true persons", listening to the Dharma, contemplating the meaning and practicing the Dharma and what accords with the Dharma. Preparatory practices also include the observance of the ethical precepts (śīlaṃ pālayati), giving, and studying the Abhidharma.

The Mahāvibhāṣa (MVŚ) contains the following succinct explanation of the stages leading up to stream entry:

At the beginning, because of his aspiration for the fruit of liberation, he diligently practices [i] giving (dāna) and the pure precepts (śīla); [ii] the understanding derived from listening, the contemplation of the impure, mindfulness of breathing and the foundations of mindfulness (smṛtyupasthāna); and [iii] warmth, summits, receptivities and the supreme mundane dharma‑s; and [then he enters into] [iv] the 15 moments of the path of vision. This is collectively said to be “firmly on one’s feet”.

=== Stages of the path ===
Vaibhāṣika developed an influential outline of the path to awakening, one which was later adapted and modified by the scholars of the Mahāyāna tradition into the schema of the "five paths" (pañcamārga). The original Vaibhāṣika schema is divided into seven stages of preparatory effort (prayoga) and four stages of spiritual fruits (phala):

Seven prayogas: (Note: According to Dhammajoti: "It is further stated that the practitioner can acquire these roots only at the stages of the ‘not-yet-arrived’ (anāgamya), the intermediate meditation (dhyānāntara) and the four meditations (dhyāna). This means that he must have acquired the degree of concentration of the ‘not-yet arrived’ stage. This stage is a ‘neighborhood’ (sāmantaka), i.e., a meditative state bordering the dhyāna stage proper into which its power of concentration is strong enough to lead. There is one such ‘neighborhood’ stage bordering each of the meditative attainments (samāpatti). Since there are eight meditative attainments — four dhyānas (also called the four ‘fundamental or principal meditations’, maula‑dhyāna) of the fine‑material sphere and four meditative attainments of the non-material sphere (ārūpya) — there are corresponding eight ‘neighborhood’ stages, the first of which, bordering the first dhyāna, is called the ‘not‑yet-arrived’ stage." Dhammajoti 2009 p. 445.)

- Mokṣabhāgīya ("conducing to liberation") refers to meditations which are causes for liberation, mainly calm and insight. These are not completely separate and can exist together in the same thought. They are also said to constitute the wisdom (prajñā) derived from cultivation. These are outlined as follows:
  - Śamatha (calming meditation) practices, mainly contemplation on the impure (aśubha-bhāvanā) and mindfulness of breathing (ānāpānasmṛti), but also includes other meditations such as loving kindness (maitrī).
  - Vipaśyana (insight meditation), consisting of the fourfold application of mindfulness (smṛtyupasthānas) practiced one at a time, contemplating how they are impure, unsatisfactory, impermanent and without a self.
  - In a more advanced stage of vipaśyana, one meditates on the four smṛtyupasthānas at the same time.
- Nirvedhabhāgīya ("conducing to penetration") refers to the "four skillful roots" (kuśalamūla) of the arising of out-flow free knowledge. It thus refers to that which leads stream entry, the first noble (ārya) stage of liberation. They are said to be the wisdom derived from reflection. Each one serves as a cause for the next one:
  - Uṣmagata (warmth) is the initial arising of "the warmth of the noble knowledge capable of burning the fuels of defilements" (MVŚ). This is a lengthy stage, where one gradually accumulates wisdom through study, contemplation and meditation on the Dharma, especially the 16 aspects of the four noble truths. At this point, one may still retrogress.
  - Mūrdhan (summits). One continues to contemplate the 16 modes of the four noble truths, but at the highest level of excellence, their "summit" or "peak". At this point, one may still retrogress.
  - Kṣānti (receptivities) is the stage of the highest level of receptivity or acceptance of the four noble truths. One is so receptive to them that one can no longer retrogress from accepting them. There are various receptivities covering the sense sphere as well as the upper spheres of existence.
  - Laukikāgradharma (supreme mundane dharmas). These dharmas contemplate the unsatisfactoriness of the sphere of sensuality and refer to those dharmas that are a condition for the arising of the darśana-mārga (path of vision).

Four phalas:

Each has two stages, the candidacy stage and the fruit stage.

- Srotaāpatti (stream-enterer).
  - The candidate for the fruit of stream-entry (srotaāpatti-phalapratipannaka), also known as the darśana-mārga (path of vision).
  - The “abider in the fruit of stream entry” (srotaāpatti-phala-stha). At this point, one has entered the bhāvanā-mārga (path of cultivation), where one gradually eliminates all the remaining defilements.
- Sakṛdāgāmin (once-returner), both stages fall within the bhāvanā-mārga.
- Anāgāmin (non-returner), both stages also fall within the bhāvanā-mārga.
- Arhat. Its candidacy stage is part of the bhāvanā-mārga, but the phala stage is known as aśaikṣa-mārga (path of no more learning).

In the prayoga stages, the contemplation of the four noble truths was done with knowledge that are with-outflow (sāsrava). Immediately after the last prayoga stage, one is able to access outflow-free knowledges (anāsrava-jñāna), and must apply these to the noble truths. This is known as direct realisation (abhisamaya), direct spiritual insight into the intrinsic and common characteristics of the four truths. This takes 16 thought moments. Insight into the truths is achieved in two moments called "paths". Dhammajoti explains them as follows:

In the first moment, called the unhindered path (ānantarya-mārga), the outflow-free understanding that arises is called a receptivity (kṣānti) to knowledge, and with this, the defilements abandonable by vision into the particular truth are abandoned. In the following moment, called the path of liberation (vimukti-mārga), knowledge proper arises through the induction of which the acquisition (prāpti) of the cessation through deliberation (pratisaṃkhyā-nirodha) of the defilements arises. In this way, for the whole contemplative process covering the sphere of sensuality followed by the two upper spheres, there arise eight receptivities and eight knowledges, all being prajñā in their intrinsic nature.

From the first moment of insight, which is the first moment of receptivitity, one is said to be an ārya, a noble being. This is because the out-flow free path has arisen in them and thus they are no longer an ordinary worldling (pṛthagjanatva). Also, according to this system, when one has entered into stream entry, there is no going back, no retrogression. Regarding arhatship, some arhats can retrogress, mainly those who, due to their weak faculties, entered the path as a "pursuer through faith" (śraddhānusārin). Those who have sharp faculties and have studied and understood the teachings (dharmānusārins) are not retrogressible, they are ‘ones liberated through wisdom’ (prajñā-vimukta).

=== The three vehicles and noble beings ===
The Vaibhāṣika Sarvāstivādins are known to have employed schema of the three vehicles, which can be seen in the Mahāvibhāṣā:

1. Śrāvakayāna – The vehicle of the disciples, who reach the attainment of an Arhat.
2. Pratyekabuddhayāna – The vehicle of the "Solitary Buddhas".
3. Bodhisattvayāna – The vehicle of the beings who are training to become a fully enlightened buddha (Samyaksambuddha).

The Vaibhāṣikas held that though arhats have been fully liberated through the removal of all defilements, their wisdom (prajñā) is not fully perfected and thus inferior to a Buddha's wisdom. Also, arhats have subtle traces (vāsanā) that the defilements have left behind after they have been abandoned. Thus, for Vaibhāṣikas, arhats are said to have a certain non-defiled ignorance (akliṣṭājñāna), which Buddhas lack. Furthermore, a Buddha has both omniscience (sarvajñā) and ‘wisdom of all modes’ (sarva‑ākāra‑jñāna), i.e. a knowledge of all the spiritual paths.

The inferiority of the arhat attainment can be seen in texts such as the Sarvāstivādin Nāgadatta Sūtra, which critiques the Mahīśāsaka view of women in a narrative about a bhikṣuṇī named Nāgadatta. Here, the demon Māra takes the form of her father, and tries to convince her to work toward the lower stage of an arhat. Nāgadatta rejects this, saying, "A Buddha's wisdom is like empty space of the ten-quarters, which can enlighten innumerable people. But an Arhat's wisdom is inferior."

However, against the docetic view of the Mahāsāṃghikas, the Sarvāstivādins viewed the Buddha's physical body (Skt. rūpakāya) as being impure and improper for taking refuge in, and they instead regarded taking refuge in the Buddha as taking refuge in bodhi itself (awakening) and also in the Dharmakāya (body of the teaching).

The Sarvāstivādins also admitted the path of a bodhisattva as a valid one. References to the bodhisattva path and the practice of the six pāramitās are commonly found in Sarvāstivāda works. The Mahāvibhāṣā of the Vaibhāṣika Sarvāstivādins includes a schema of four pāramitās: generosity (dāna), discipline (śīla), energy (vīrya), and wisdom (prajñā), and it says that the four pāramitās and six pāramitās are essentially equivalent (seeing patience as a kind of discipline and meditation as a kind of intuitive wisdom).
