= Vasumitra (Buddhism) =

Translations of Vasumitra
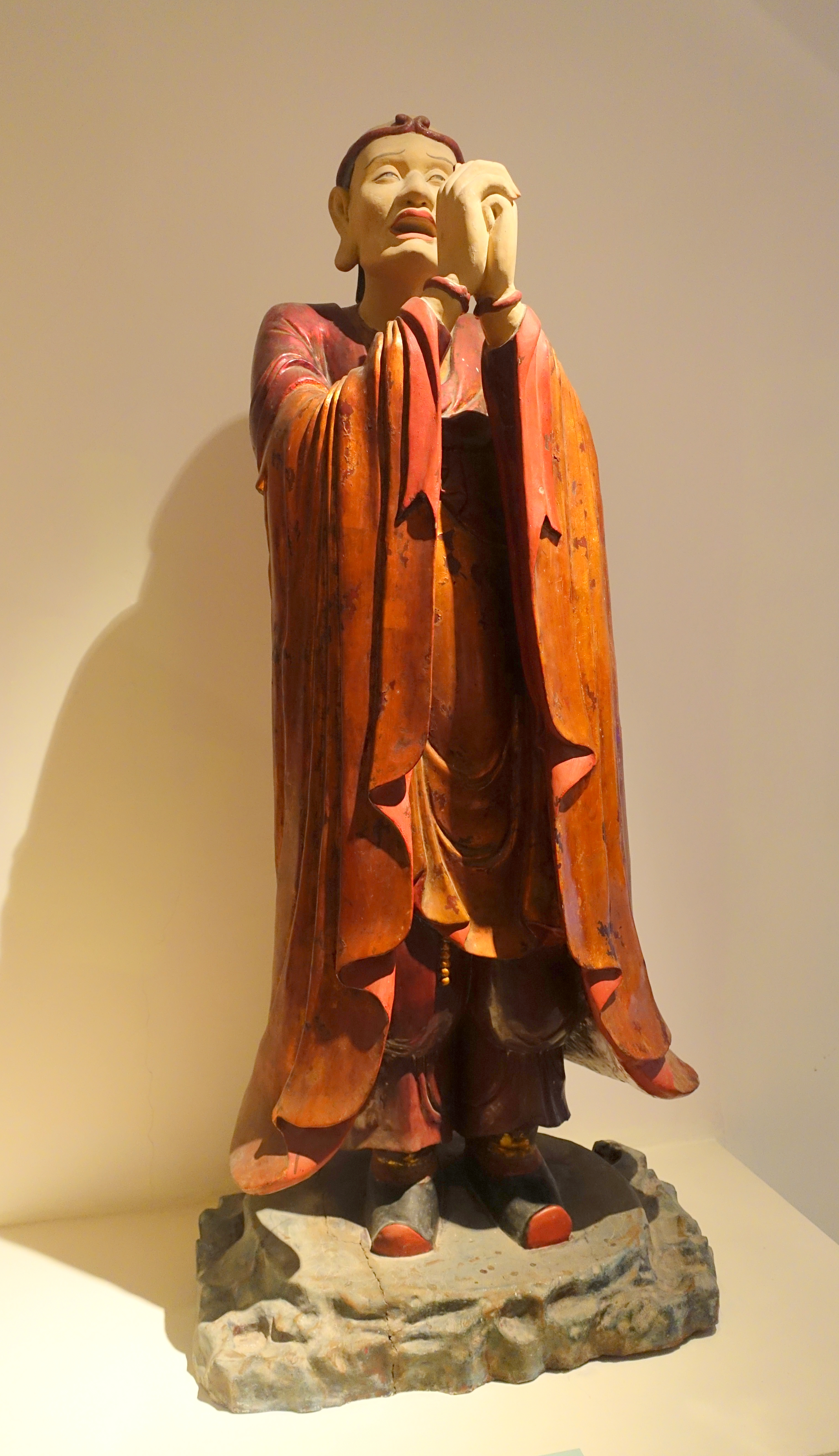
- Vasumitra statue, Tây Phương Temple, Vietnam, 1794 AD
- Sanskrit: Vasumitra
- Chinese: 世友 or 婆須蜜多
- Japanese: 世友 (Rōmaji: Seu)
- Vietnamese: Bà Tu Mật

Vasumitra was a Buddhist monk of the Sarvastivada school who flourished in the 2nd century CE. A native of Gandhāra, he presided over the 4th Buddhist council in Kashmir, administered by Kanishka I. He is credited as contributing to the Mahāvibhāṣā.

== Contribution ==
Vasumitra put forward a thesis to defend the tenet of the Sarvastivada school that dharmas exist in the past and future as well as the present. According to this argument, dharmas exist in a noumenal or latent state in the future until they attain a moment of causal efficacy (karitra) in the present. This marks their entry into a functional relationship with other phenomena. When this moment is past, they reenter into a noumenal state that is understood as "past." Vasumitra's theory of temporality was accepted in preference to the views posited by other monks such as Dharmatrāta, Ghoṣa, and Buddhadeva.

== Ancestor ==
Vasumitra is the eighth zen ancestor. According to Soto Zen tradition, Vasumitra "always wore clean clothing. He used to wander around the villages carrying a wine vessel, whistling and singing. People thought he was crazy."
