= Udanavarga =

The Udānavarga is an early Buddhist collection of topically organized chapters (Sanskrit: varga) of aphoristic verses or "utterances" (Sanskrit: udāna) attributed to the Buddha and his disciples. While not part of the Pali Canon, the Udānavarga has many chapter titles, verses and an overall format similar to those found in the Pali Canon's Dhammapada and Udāna. At this time, there exist one Sanskrit recension, two Chinese recensions and two or three Tibetan recensions of the Udānavarga.

== Content ==
The Udānavarga has around 1100 verses in 33 chapters. The chapter titles are:

1. Anityavarga
2. Kāmavarga
3. Tṛṣṇāvarga
4. Apramādavarga
5. Priyavarga
6. Śīlavarga
7. Sucaritavarga
8. Vācavarga
9. Karmavarga
10. Śraddhāvargas
11. Śramaṇavarga
12. Mārgavarga
13. Satkāravarga
14. Drohavarga
15. Smṛtivarga
16. Prakirṇakavarga
17. Udakavarga
18. Puṣpavarga
19. Aśvavarga
20. Krodhavarga
21. Tathāgatavarga
22. Śrutavarga
23. Ātmavarga
24. Peyālavarga
25. Mitravarga
26. Nirvāṇavarga
27. Paśyavarga
28. Pāpavarga
29. Yugavarga
30. Sukhavarga
31. Cittavarga
32. Bhikṣuvarga
33. Brāhmaṇavarga

Comparatively, the most common version of the Dhammapada, in Pali, has 423 verses in 26 chapters. Comparing the Udānavarga, Pali Dhammapada and the Gandhari Dharmapada, Brough (2001) identifies that the texts have in common 330 to 340 verses, 16 chapter headings and an underlying structure.

== History ==
The Udānavarga is attributed by Brough to the Sarvāstivādins.

Hinüber suggests that a text similar to the Pali Canon's Udāna formed the original core of the Sanskrit Udānavarga, to which verses from the Dhammapada were added. Brough allows for the hypothesis that the Udānavarga, the Pali Dhammapada and the Gandhari Dharmapada all have a "common ancestor" but underlines that there is no evidence that any one of these three texts might have been the "primitive Dharmapada" from which the other two evolved.

The Tibetan Buddhist and Chinese Buddhist canons' recensions are traditionally said to have been compiled by Dharmatrāta. (Note: While acknowledging the traditional view, Brough also refers to a statement by Nāgārjuna that might suggest that this work was initially collected at "the time of the original compilation of the canon ... immediately after the Nirvāṇa of the Buddha" while Dharmatrāta contributed the commentaries.)

== See also ==
- Dhammapada
- Udana
