= Abhidharma =

Buddhist traditions and texts dating from the 3rd century BCE onwards

Translations of Abhidharma
- English: higher teaching, meta-teaching, about dharmas [phenomena]
- Sanskrit: अभिधर्मः
- Pali: Abhidhamma
- Bengali: অভিধর্ম্ম ôbhidhôrmmô
- Burmese: အဘိဓမ္မာ (MLCTS: əbḭdəmà)
- Chinese: 阿毗達磨(T) / 阿毗达磨(S) (Pinyin: āpídámó)
- Japanese: 阿毘達磨 (Rōmaji: abidatsuma)
- Khmer: អភិធម្ម (UNGEGN: âphĭthômm)
- Korean: 아비달마 阿毗達磨 (RR: abidalma)
- Mongolian: Авидарма
- Sinhala: අභිධර්මය (abhidharmaya)
- Tagalog: ᜀᜊᜒᜇᜍ᜕ᜋ abidarma
- Tibetan: ཆོས་མངོན་པ་མཛོད།
- Thai: อภิธรรม (RTGS: aphitham)
- Vietnamese: 阿毗達磨; A-tì-đạt-ma 阿毗達磨; Vi Diệu Pháp

The Abhidharma (lit. "about the dharma") refers to a class of Buddhist texts, the first of which date from the 3rd century BCE. Abhidharma texts contain detailed scholastic presentations of Buddhist doctrine, including doctrines that appear in canonical Buddhist scriptures and commentaries. "Abhidharma" also refers to the scholastic method itself, and the knowledge (prajña) that this method is said to study and cultivate.

Bhikkhu Bodhi calls Abhidharma "an abstract and highly technical systemization of the [Buddhist] doctrine," which is "simultaneously a philosophy, a psychology and an ethics, all integrated into the framework of a program for liberation." According to Peter Harvey, the Abhidharma method seeks "to avoid the inexactitudes of colloquial conventional language, as is sometimes found in the Suttas, and state everything in psycho-philosophically exact language." In this sense, it is an attempt to best express the Buddhist view of "ultimate reality" (paramārtha-satya).

There are different types of Abhidharma literature. The early canonical Abhidharma works, such as the Pali Abhidhamma Piṭaka, are not philosophical treatises but mainly summaries and expositions of early Buddhist doctrinal lists with their accompanying explanations. These texts developed out of early Buddhist lists or matrices (mātṛkās) of key teachings.

Later post-canonical Abhidharma works were written as either large treatises (śāstra), as commentaries (aṭṭhakathā), or as smaller introductory manuals. There were numerous schools of Abhidharma in India, such as the Theravada, and the Vaibhāṣika. They are more developed philosophical works which include many innovations and doctrines not found in the canonical Abhidharma. Abhidharma remains an important field of scholarship among the Theravāda, Mahāyāna, and Vajrayāna schools of Buddhism.

== Definition ==
The Belgian Indologist Étienne Lamotte described the Abhidharma as "Doctrine pure and simple, without the intervention of literary development or the presentation of individuals" Compared to the colloquial Buddhist sūtras, Abhidharma texts are much more technical, analytic, and systematic in content and style. The Theravādin and Sarvāstivādin Abhidharmikas generally considered the Abhidharma to be the pure and literal (nippariyaya) description of ultimate truth (paramattha sacca) and an expression of perfect spiritual wisdom (prajñā), while the sutras were considered 'conventional' (sammuti) and figurative (pariyaya) teachings, given by Gautama Buddha to specific people, at specific times, depending on specific worldly circumstances. They held that Abhidharma was taught by the Buddha to his most eminent disciples, and that therefore this justified the inclusion of Abhidharma texts into their scriptural canon.

According to Collett Cox, Abhidharma started as a systematic elaboration of the teachings of the Buddhist sūtras, but later developed independent doctrines. The prominent Western scholar of Abhidharma, Erich Frauwallner, has said that these Buddhist systems are "among the major achievements of the classical period of Indian philosophy."

Two interpretations of the term "Abhi-dharma" are common. According to Bhikkhu Anālayo, the initial meaning of Abhidharma in the earliest texts (such as the Mahāgosiṅga-sutta and its parallels) was simply a discussion concerning the Dharma, or talking about the Dharma. In this sense, abhi has the meaning of "about" or "concerning," and can also be seen in the parallel term abhivinaya (which just means discussions about the vinaya). The other interpretation, where abhi is interpreted as meaning "higher" or "superior", and thus Abhidharma means "higher teaching", seems to have been a later development.

Some Western scholars have considered the Abhidharma to be the core of what is referred to as "Buddhism and psychology". Other scholars on the topic, such as Nyanaponika Thera and Dan Lusthaus, describe Abhidharma as a Buddhist phenomenology while Noa Ronkin and Kenneth Inada equate it with process philosophy. Bhikkhu Bodhi writes that the system of the Abhidhamma Piṭaka is "simultaneously a philosophy, a psychology and an ethics, all integrated into the framework of a program for liberation." According to L. S. Cousins, the Buddhist sūtras deal with sequences and processes, while the Abhidharma texts describe occasions and events.

== Origin and history ==
=== Modern scholarship ===
Modern scholars generally believe that the canonical Abhidharma texts emerged after the time of Gautama Buddha, in around the 3rd century BCE. Therefore, the canonical Abhidharma works are generally claimed by scholars not to represent the words of the Buddha himself, but those of later Buddhist thinkers. Peter Skilling describes the Abhidharma literature as "the end-product of several centuries of intellectual endeavor".

The Vinaya accounts on the compilation of the Buddhist Canon following the parinirvāṇa of Gautama Buddha (c. 5th century BCE) offer various and sometimes conflicting narratives regarding the canonical status of Abhidharma. While the Mahāsāṅghika Vinaya does not speak of an Abhidharma apart from the Sūtra Piṭaka and the Vinaya Piṭaka, the Mahīśāsaka, Theravāda, Dharmaguptaka, and Sarvāstivāda Vinayas all provide different accounts which mention that there was some kind of Abhidharma to be learned aside from the sūtras and Vinaya. According to Bhikkhu Anālayo, "the Mūlasarvāstivāda Vinaya does not explicitly mention the Abhidharma, although it reports that on this occasion Mahākāśyapa recited the mātṛkā(s)." Bhikkhu Anālayo thinks that this reflects an early stage, when what later became Abhidharma was called the mātṛkās. The term appears in some sūtras, such as the Mahāgopālaka-sutta (and its Sanskrit parallel) which says that a learned monk is one who knows the Dharma, Vinaya, and the mātṛkās.

==== The ancient core (the mātṛkās) ====
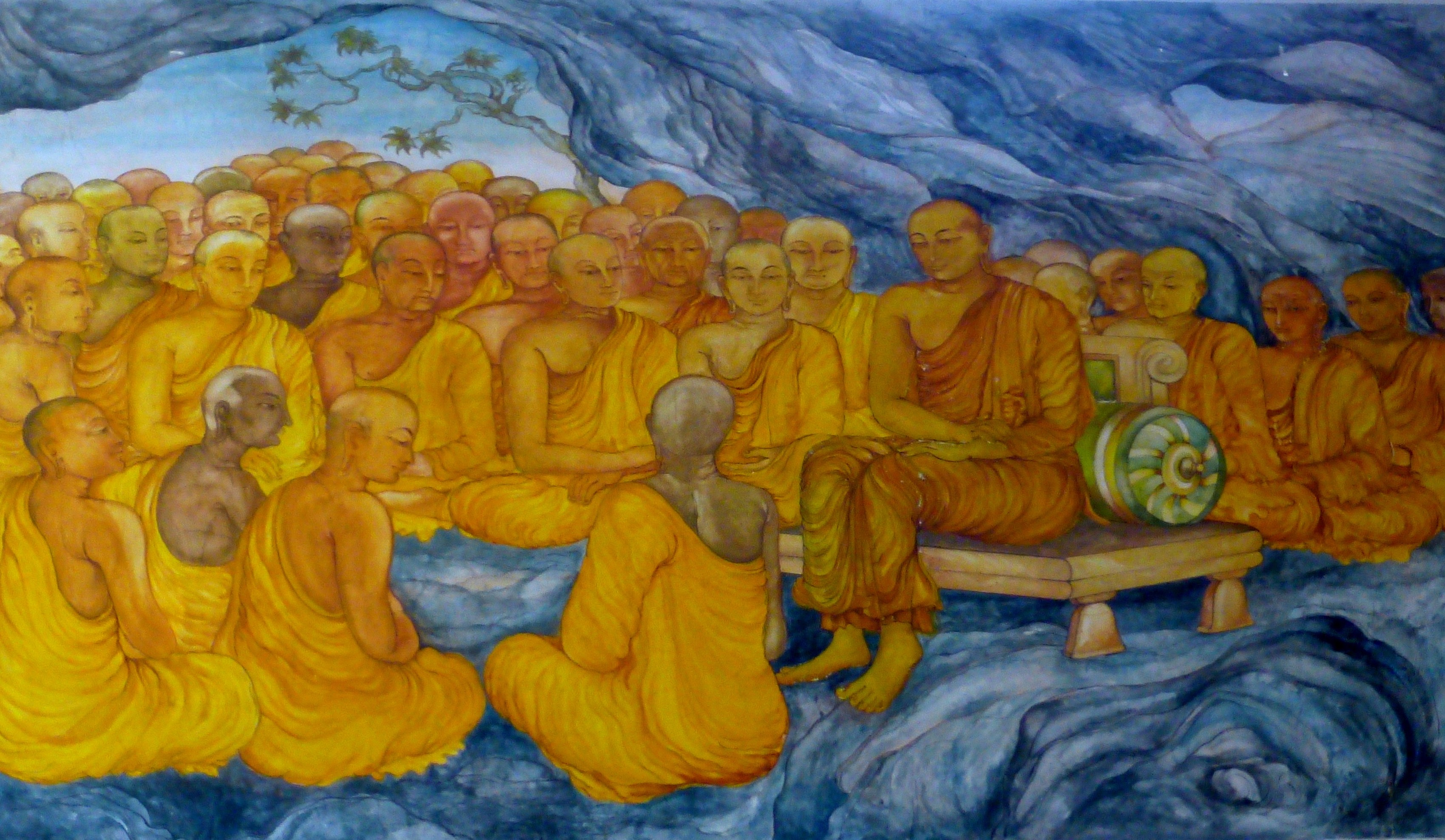
Depiction of the First Council at Rajgir, a painting at the Nava Jetavana, Shravasti.

Western scholars of Buddhist studies such as André Migot, Edward J. Thomas, Erich Frauwallner, Rupert Gethin, and Johannes Bronkhorst have argued that the Abhidharma was based on early and ancient lists of doctrinal terms which are called mātikās (Sanskrit: mātṛkā). Migot points to the mention of a "Mātṛkā Piṭaka" in the Cullavagga as the precursor to the canonical Abhidharma. Migot argues that this Mātṛkā Piṭaka, said to have been recited by Mahākāśyapa at the First Council according to the Ashokavadana, likely began as a condensed version of the Buddhist doctrine that was expanded over time. Thomas and Frauwallner both argue that while the Abhidharma texts of the different schools were compiled separately and have major differences, they are based on an "ancient core" of common material. Rupert Gethin also writes that the mātikās are from an earlier date than the Abhidharma texts themselves.

According to Frauwallner,

The oldest Buddhist tradition has no Abhidharmapitaka but only mātṛkā. What this means is that besides the small number of fundamental doctrinal statements, the Buddha's sermons also contain a quantity of doctrinal concepts. The most suitable form for collecting and preserving these concepts would have been comprehensive lists. Lists of this kind were called mātṛkā, and it was from these lists that the Abhidharma later developed.

The extensive use of mātṛkā can be found in some early Buddhist texts, including the Saṅgīti Sutta and Dasuttara Sutta of the Dīgha Nikāya, as well as the Saṅgīti Sūtra and Daśottara Sūtra of the Dīrgha Āgama. Similar lists of numerically arranged doctrinal terms can be found in AN 10.27 and AN 10.28. Tse fu Kuan also argues that certain sūtras of the Aṅguttara Nikāya (AN 3.25, AN 4.87–90, AN 9.42–51) illustrates an Abhidharma method.

Another text which contains a similar list that acts as a doctrinal summary is the Madhyama-āgama ("Discourse on Explaining the Spheres", MĀ 86) which includes a list of thirty one topics to be taught to newly ordained monastics. The last sutra of the Madhyama-āgama (MĀ 222) contains a similar doctrinal summary listing, which combines three lists into one: a list of eight activities, a list of ten mental qualities and practices, and the twelve links of dependent arising. These two do not have any parallels in Pali.

According to Bhikkhu Anālayo, another important doctrinal list which appears in the early texts is the "thirty seven qualities that are conducive to awakening" (bodhipākṣikā dharmāḥ). This mātṛkā appears in various sūtras, like the Pāsādika-sutta, the Sāmagāma-sutta (and their parallels), and in the Mahāparinirvāṇa-sūtra, where it is said to have been taught by the Buddha just before passing away.

Bhikkhu Anālayo notes that these various lists served a useful purpose in early Buddhism since they served as aids for the memorization and teaching of the Buddhist doctrine. The use of lists containing doctrinal statements can similarly be seen in Jain literature. The fact that these lists were seen by the early Buddhists as a way to preserve and memorize the doctrine can be seen in the Saṅgīti Sūtra and its various parallels, which mention how the Jain community became divided over doctrinal matters after the death of their leader. The sutta depicts Śāriputra as reciting a list of doctrinal terms and stating that the community will remain "united, unanimous, and in unison we will not dispute" regarding the teaching and also states they will recite together the doctrine. The close connection between the Saṅgīti Sūtra and Abhidharma can be seen in the fact that it became the basis for one of the seven canonical Abhidharma texts belonging to the Sarvāstivāda school, the Saṅgītiparyāya, which is effectively a commentary on the sūtra.

Frauwallner notes that basic fundamental concepts such as the 12 āyatanāni, the 18 dhatāvah, and the 5 skandhāh often occur as a group in the early Buddhist texts. He also points out another such list that occurs in various texts "comprises several groups of elements of import for entanglement in the cycle of existence" and was modeled on the Oghavagga of the Samyuttanikaya. These lists were intended as a basic way of explaining the Buddhist doctrine, and are likely to have been accompanied by oral explanations, which continued to develop and expand and were later written down.

Another related early method is called the mātṛkā ("attribute"), and refers to lists of terms divided by a dyad or triad of attributes. For example, terms could be grouped into those things that are rūpa (form, physical) or arūpa (formless), saṃskṛtam (constructed) or asaṃskṛtam, and the triad of kuśalam (wholesome), akuśalam (unwholesome), or avyākṛtam (indetermined). An early form of this method can be found in the Dasuttara Sutta.

==== Development ====
The explanations of the various elements in these lists also dealt with how these elements were connected (saṃprayoga) with each other. Over time, the need arose for an overarching way to classify all these terms and doctrinal elements, and the first such framework was to subsume or include (saṃgraha) all main terms into the schema of the 12 āyatanāni, the 18 dhatāvah, and the 5 skandhāh.

Over time, the initial scholastic method of listing and categorizing terms was expanded in order to provide a complete and comprehensive systematization of the Buddhist doctrine. According to Bhikkhu Anālayo, the beginning of Abhidharma proper was inspired by the desire "to be as comprehensive as possible, to supplement the directives given in the early discourses for progress on the path with a full picture of all aspects of the path in an attempt to provide a complete map of everything in some way related to the path." As Frauwallner explains, due to this scholastic impulse, lists grew in size, different mātṛkās were combined with each other to produce new ones, and new concepts and schemas were introduced, such as the differentiation of cittas and caitasikās and new ways of connecting or relating the various elements with each other.

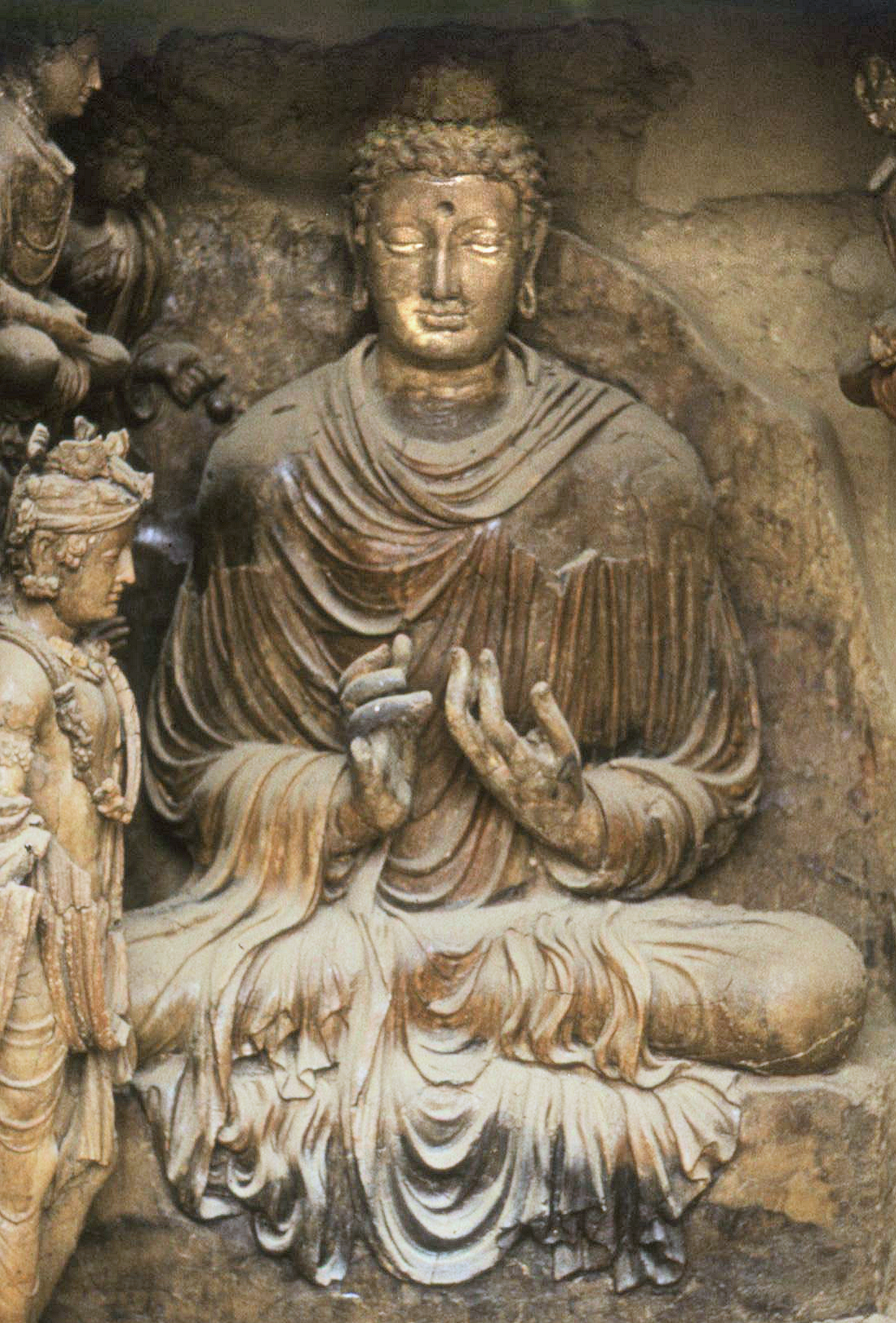
Seated Buddha from the Sarvāstivādin monastery of Tapa Shotor, 2nd century CE

According to Bhikkhu Anālayo, these various lists were also not presented alone, but included some kind of commentary and explanation which was also part of the oral tradition. Sometimes this commentary included quotations from other sutras, and traces of this can be found in the canonical Abhidharma texts. As time passed, these commentaries and their accompanying lists became inseparable from each other, and the commentaries gained canonical status. Thus, according to Bhikkhu Anālayo:

just as the combination of the prātimokṣa with its commentary was central for the development of the Vinaya, so too the combination of mātṛkās with a commentary was instrumental in the development of the Abhidharma. Thus the use of a mātṛkā together with its exegesis is a characteristic common to the Abhidharma and the Vinaya, whose expositions often take the form of a commentary on a summary list.

Therefore, the different Buddhist Abhidharma texts were developed over time as Buddhist monks and philosophers expanded their analytical methods in different ways. Since this happened in different monastic communities located in different regions, they developed in separate doctrinal directions. This divergence was perhaps enhanced by the various schisms in the early Buddhist community and also by geographic distance. According to Frauwallner, the period of the development of the canonical Abhidharma texts is between 250 and 50 BCE. By the time, the different canons began to be written down, and as a result the Abhidharma texts of the early Buddhist schools were substantially different, as can be seen in how different the canonical Abhidharma texts are in the Sarvāstivādin and Theravādin schools. These differences are much more pronounced than among the other canonical collections (Sūtras, Āgama, and Vinaya). As such, the Abhidharma collections of the various Buddhist schools are much more unique to each sect. The various Abhidharmic traditions grew to have very fundamental philosophical disagreements with each other (such as on the status of the person, or temporal eternalism). Thus, according to Frauwallner, the different Abhidharma canons contained collections of doctrines which were sometimes unrelated to each other and sometimes contradictory.

These different Abhidharmic theories were (together with differences in Vinaya) some of the various causes for the splits in the monastic Saṃgha, which resulted in the fragmented early Buddhist landscape of the early Buddhist schools. However, these differences did not mean the existence of totally independent sects, as noted by Rupert Gethin, "at least some of the schools mentioned by later Buddhist tradition are likely to have been informal schools of thought in the manner of ‘Cartesians,’ ‘British Empiricists,’ or ‘Kantians’ for the history of modern philosophy." By the 7th-century, Chinese pilgrim Xuanzang could reportedly collect Abhidharma texts from seven different Buddhist traditions. These various Abhidharma works were not accepted by all Indian Buddhist schools as canonical; for example, the Mahāsāṃghika school seems not to have accepted them as part of their Buddhist canon. Another school included most of the Khuddaka Nikāya within the Abhidhamma Piṭaka.

After the closing of the foundational Buddhist canons, Abhidharma texts continued to be composed, but now they were either commentaries on the canonical texts (like the Pāli Aṭṭhakathās and the Mahāvibhāṣa), or independent treatises (śāstra) in their own right. In these post-canonical texts, further doctrinal developments and innovations can be found. As Noa Ronkin writes, "post-canonical Abhidharma texts became complex philosophical treatises employing sophisticated methods of argumentation and independent investigations that resulted in doctrinal conclusions quite far removed from their canonical antecedents." As Frauwallner writes, these later works were attempts to build truly complete philosophical systems out of the various canonical Abhidharma texts.

Some of these texts surpassed the canonical Abhidharma in influence and popularity, becoming the orthodox summas of their particular schools' Abhidharma. Two exegetical texts, both from the 5th century, stand above the rest as the most influential. The works of Buddhaghosa (5th century CE), particularly the Visuddhimagga, remains the main reference work of the Theravāda school, while the Abhidharmakośa (4–5th century CE) of Vasubandhu remains the primary source for Abhidharma studies in both Indo-Tibetan Buddhism and East Asian Buddhism.

In the modern era, only the Abhidharma texts of the Sarvāstivādins and the Theravādins have survived as complete collections, each consisting of seven books with accompanying commentarial literature. A small number of other Abhidharma texts are preserved in the Chinese Canon and also in Sanskrit fragments, such as the Śāriputra Abhidharma Śāstra of the Dharmaguptaka school and various texts from the Pudgalavāda tradition. These different traditions have some similarities, suggesting either interaction between groups or some common ground antedating the separation of the schools.

=== Traditional views ===
In the Theravāda tradition it was held that the Abhidhamma was not a later addition, but rather was taught in the fourth week of Gautama Buddha's enlightenment. The Theravada tradition is unique in regarding its Abhidharma as having been taught in its complete form by the Buddha as a single teaching, with the exception of the Kathavatthu, which contains material relating to later disputes and was held to only have been presented as an outline.

According to their tradition, devas built a beautiful jeweled residence for the Buddha to the north-east of the Bodhi tree, where he meditated and delivered the Abhidharma teachings to gathered deities in the Trāyastriṃśa heaven, including his deceased mother Māyā. The tradition holds that the Buddha gave daily summaries of the teachings given in the heavenly realm to the bhikkhu Sariputta, who passed them on.

The Sarvāstivāda-Vaibhāṣika held that the Buddha and his disciples taught the Abhidharma, but that it was scattered throughout the canon. Only after his death was the Abhidharma compiled systematically by his elder disciples and was recited by Ananda at the first Buddhist council.

The Sautrāntika school ('those who rely on the sutras') rejected the status of the Abhidharma as being Buddhavacana (word of the Buddha), they held it was the work of different monks after his death, and that this was the reason different Abhidharma schools varied widely in their doctrines. However, this school still studied and debated on Abhidharma concepts and thus did not seek to question the method of the Abhidharma in its entirety. Indeed, there were numerous Abhidharma texts written from an Abhidharma perspective. According to K.L. Dhammajoti, the commentator Yaśomitra even states that "the Sautrantikas can be said to have an abhidharma collection, i.e., as texts that are declared to be varieties of sutra in which the characteristics of factors are described."

== Doctrine ==
The Abhidharma texts' field of inquiry extends to the entire Buddhadharma, since their goal was to outline, systematize and analyze all of the teachings. Abhidharmic thought also extends beyond the sutras to cover new philosophical and psychological ground which is only implicit in sutras or not present at all. There are certain doctrines which were developed or even invented by the Abhidharmikas and these became grounds for the debates among the different early Buddhist schools.

=== Dhamma theory ===
The "base upon which the entire [Abhidhamma] system rests" is the 'dhamma theory' and this theory 'penetrated all the early schools'. For the Abhidharmikas, the ultimate components of existence, the elementary constituents of experience were called dhammas (Pali: dhammas). This concept has been variously translated as "factors" (Collett Cox), "psychic characteristics" (Bronkhorst), "phenomena" (Nyanaponika) and "psycho-physical events" (Ronkin).

The early Buddhist scriptures give various lists of the constituents of the person such as the five skandhas, the six or 18 dhatus, and the twelve sense bases. In Abhidhamma literature, these lists of dhammas systematically arranged and they were seen as the ultimate entities or momentary events which make up the fabric of people's experience of reality. The idea was to create an exhaustive list of all possible phenomena that make up the world.

The conventional reality of substantial objects and persons is merely a conceptual construct imputed by the mind on a flux of dhammas. However, dhammas are never seen as individually separate entities, but are always dependently conditioned by other dhammas in a stream of momentary constellations of dhammas, constantly coming into being and vanishing, always in flux. Perception and thinking is then seen as a combination of various dhammas. Cittas (awareness events) are never experienced on their own, but are always intentional and hence accompanied by various mental factors (cetasikas), in a constantly flowing stream of experience occurrences.

Human experience is thus explained by a series of dynamic processes and their patterns of relationships with each other. Buddhist Abhidhamma philosophers then sought to explain all experience by creating lists and matrices (matikas) of these dhammas, which varied by school. The four categories of dhammas in the Theravada Abhidhamma are:

1. Citta (Mind, Consciousness, awareness)
2. Cetasika (mental factors, mental events, associated mentality), there are 52 types
3. Rūpa — (physical occurrences, material form), 28 types
4. Nibbāna — (Extinction, cessation). This dhamma is unconditioned it neither arises nor ceases due to causal interaction.

The Sarvastivada Abhidharma also used these, along with a fifth category: "factors dissociated from thought" (cittaviprayuktasaṃskāra). The Sarvastivadas also included three dharmas in the fourth "unconditioned" category instead of just one, the dharma of space and two states of cessation.

The Abhidharma project was thus to provide a completely exhaustive account of every possible type of conscious experience in terms of its constituent factors and their relations. The Theravada tradition holds that there were 82 types of possible dhammas – 82 types of occurrences in the experiential world, while the general Sarvastivada tradition eventually enumerated 75 dharma types.

For the Abhidharmikas, truth was twofold and there are two ways of looking at reality. One way is the way of everyday experience and of normal worldly persons. This is the category of the nominal and the conceptual (paññatti), and is termed the conventional truth (saṃvṛti-satya). However, the way of the Abhidharma, and hence the way of enlightened persons like the Buddha, who have developed the true insight (vipassana), sees reality as the constant stream of collections of dharmas, and this way of seeing the world is ultimate truth (paramārtha-satya).

As the Indian Buddhist Vasubandhu writes: "Anything the idea of which does not occur upon division or upon mental analysis, such as an object like a pot, that is a 'conceptual fiction'. The ultimately real is otherwise." For Vasubandhu then, something is not the ultimately real if it 'disappears under analysis', but is merely conventional.

The ultimate goal of the Abhidharma is Nirvana and hence the Abhidharmikas systematized dhammas into those which are skillful (kusala), purify the mind and lead to liberation, and those which are unskillful and do not. The Abhidharma then has a soteriological purpose, first and foremost and its goal is to support Buddhist practice and meditation. By carefully watching the coming and going of dhammas, and being able to identify which ones are wholesome and to be cultivated, and which ones are unwholesome and to be abandoned, the Buddhist meditator makes use of the Abhidharma as a schema to liberate his mind and realize that all experiences are impermanent, not-self, unsatisfactory and therefore not to be clung to.

=== Svabhāva ===
The Abhidharmikas often used the term svabhāva (Pali: sabhāva) to explain the causal workings of dharmas. This term was used in different ways by the different Buddhist schools. This term does not appear in the sutras. The Abhidharmakośabhāṣya states: “dharma means ‘upholding,’ [namely], upholding intrinsic nature (svabhāva)” while the Theravādin commentaries holds that: “dhammas are so called because they bear their intrinsic natures, or because they are borne by causal conditions.” Dharmas were also said to be distinct from each other by their intrinsic/unique characteristics (svalaksana). The examination of these characteristics was held to be extremely important, the Sarvastivada Mahavibhasa states "Abhidharma is [precisely] the analysis of the svalaksana and samanya-laksana of dharmas".

According to Peter Harvey, the Theravadin view of dharmas was that "'They are dhammas because they uphold their own nature [sabhaava]. They are dhammas because they are upheld by conditions or they are upheld according to their own nature' (Asl.39). Here 'own-nature' would mean characteristic nature, which is not something inherent in a dhamma as a separate ultimate reality, but arise due to the supporting conditions both of other dhammas and previous occurrences of that dhamma."

The Visuddhimagga of Buddhaghosa, the most influential classical Theravada treatise, states that not-self does not become apparent because it is concealed by "compactness" when one does not give attention to the various elements which make up the person. The Paramatthamañjusa Visuddhimaggatika of Acariya Dhammapala, a later Theravada commentary on the Visuddhimagga, refers to the fact that we often assume unity and compactness in phenomena and functions which are instead made up of various elements, but when one sees that these are merely empty dhammas, one can understand the not-self characteristic:

"when they are seen after resolving them by means of knowledge into these elements, they disintegrate like froth subjected to compression by the hand. They are mere states (dhamma) occurring due to conditions and void. In this way the characteristic of not-self becomes more evident."

The Sarvastivadins saw dharmas as the ultimately 'real entities' (sad-dravya), though they also held that dharmas were dependently originated. For the Sarvastivadins, a synonym for svabhava is avayaya (a 'part'), the smallest possible unit which cannot be analyzed into smaller parts and hence it is ultimately real as opposed to only conventionally real (such as a chariot or a person). However, the Sarvastivadins did not hold that dharmas were completely independent of each other, as the Mahavibhasa states: "conditioned dharmas are weak in their intrinsic nature, they can accomplish their activities only through mutual dependence" and "they have no sovereignty (aisvarya). They are dependent on others."

Svabhava in the early Abhidhamma texts was then not a term which meant ontological independence, metaphysical essence or underlying substance, but simply referred to their characteristics, which are dependent on other conditions and qualities. According to Ronkin: "In the early Sarvāstivāda exegetical texts, then, svabhāva is used as an atemporal, invariable criterion determining what a dharma is, not necessarily that a dharma exists. The concern here is primarily with what makes categorial types of dharma unique, rather than with the ontological status of dharmas." However, in the later Sarvastivada texts, like the Mahavibhasa, the term svabhava began to be defined more ontologically as the really existing “intrinsic nature” specifying individual dharmas.

The Sautrantika school accepted the doctrine of svabhāva as referring to the distinctive or main characteristic of a dharma, but rejected the view that they exist in all three times . The Buddhist philosopher Dharmakirti uses the concept of svabhāva, though he interprets it as being based on causal powers. For Dharmakirti, the essential nature (or ‘nature-svabhāva’) is:

“The arising of an effect that is inferred by way of a causal complex is characterized as a svabhāva of that causal complex, because [the capacity for] the effect’s production does not depend on anything else.”

Other early Buddhist schools did not accept the svabhava concept, instead positing a kind of nominalism or conceptualism (prajñaptivada). This view was widespread among the Mahasamghika Nikaya. One school was even called "Prajñaptivada" because of their denial of the ultimate reality of all dharmas and their view that all dharmas are characterized by prajñapti (provisional designation or fictitious construction). Another school called the Vainasikas also held that all dharmas were without svabhava. According to Paramārtha (499–569), another school, the Ekavyavahārikas held "that both the mundane and the supramundane factors [dharmas] are merely nominal (prajñapti). They therefore claimed that all factors have no real essence, and that hence the same name applies to all [dharmas]." This helps to explain their name as “Ekavyavahārika” (those who propound the single meaning). Paramārtha also notes that the Lokottaravāda school held "that the mundane factors have arisen from perversion (viparyāsa) and are only nominal (prajñapti)." However, in contrast to the other schools, they also held that the supramundane dharmas (nirvana etc.) were not nominal but real.

This view that dharmas are empty or void is also found in the Lokānuvartana-sūtra (‘The Sutra of Conformity with the World’, Taisho No.807) which survives in Chinese and Tibetan translation, and may have been a scripture of the Purvasailas, which was a sub-school of the Mahasamghika.

=== Causality and dependent origination ===
Another important project for the Abhidharmikas was to outline a theory of causality, especially of how momentary dharmas relate to each other through causes and conditions.

The Sarvastivadin analysis focused on six causes (hetu), four conditions (pratyaya) and five effects (phala). According to K.L. Dhammajoti, for the Sarvastivada school, 'causal efficacy is the central criterion for the reality/existence (astitva) of a dharma' and hence they were also sometimes called the 'Hetuvada' school. A dharma is real because it is a cause and it has effects, if it had no causal efficacy, it would not exist. The six causes outlined by the Sarvastivada are:

1. Efficient cause (karana-hetu) – dharma A, causes dharma B
2. Homogeneous cause (sabhäga-hetu) – dharma A(1) causes another dharma A(2)
3. Universal cause (sarvatraga-hetu) – a homogeneous cause, pertaining only to defiled dharmas
4. Retribution cause (vipäka-hetu) – leads to karmic retribution
5. Co-existent cause (sahabhu-hetu) – a cause which arises from the mutuality of all dharmas, a 'simultaneous causality.'
6. Conjoined cause (samprayuktaka-hetu)

In the Mahavibhasa treatment of dependent origination, four different types are outlined:

- Momentary (ksanika) causation, as when all twelve moments of the chain are realized in a single moment of action
- Serial (sambandhika) causation, in which dependent origination is viewed in reference to the relationship between cause and effect
- Static (avasthika) causation, in which dependent origination involves twelve distinct periods of the five aggregates
- Prolonged (prakarsika) causation, in which that sequence of causation occurs over three lifetimes

The Sarvastivada Vibhasa-sastrins accepted only static dependent origination

The last book of the Pali Abhidhamma, the Patthana, sets out the main Theravada theory on conditioned relations and causality. The Patthana is an exhaustive examination of the conditioned nature (Paticcasamupada) of all dhammas. The introduction begins with a detailed list of 24 specific types of conditioned relationships (paccaya) that may pertain between different factors. The majority of these conditions have counterparts in the Sarvāstivāda Abhidharma. The Pali Abhidhammatthasangaha reduces them all to four main types.

The Sautrāntika school used a theory of 'seeds' (bīja) in the mental continuum to explain causal interaction between past and present dharmas, this theory was later developed by the Yogacara school in their theory of “storehouse consciousness” (ālayavijñāna).

=== Temporality ===
A prominent argument between the Abhidharmikas was on the Philosophy of time. The Sarvāstivādin tradition held the view (expressed in the Vijñanakaya) that dharmas exist in all three times – past, present, future; hence the name of their school means "theory of all exists". The Sautrāntika, Vibhajyavāda and Theravada schools argued against this eternalist view in favor of presentism (only the present moment exists). This argument was so central, that north Indian Buddhist schools were often named according to their philosophical position. According to Vasubandhu:

"Those who hold 'all exists' — the past, the present and the future — belong to the Sarvāstivāda. Those, on the other hand, who hold that some exist, viz., the present and the past karma that has not given fruit but not those that have given fruit or the future, are followers of the Vibhajyaväda."

Vasubandhu initially wrote in favor of Sarvāstivāda, and later critiqued this position. The Sarvāstivāda-Vaibhāṣika also held an atomistic conception of time which divided time into discrete indivisible moments (kṣaṇa) and saw all events as lasting only for a minute instant (and yet also existing in all three times).

Theravadins also held a theory of momentariness (Khāṇavāda), but it was less ontological than Sarvāstivāda and more focused on the psychological aspects of time. The Theravada divided every dhamma into three different instants of origination (uppādakkhaṇa), endurance (ṭhitikkhaṇa) and cessation (bhaṅgakkhaṇa). They also held that only mental events were momentary, material events could endure for longer.

=== Rebirth and personal identity ===
A key problem which the Abhidharmikas wished to tackle was the question of how rebirth and karma works if there is no self to be reborn apart from the five aggregates. The Patthana includes the earliest Pali canonical reference to an important answer to this question: bhavanga, or 'life-continuum'. Bhavanga, literally, "the limb on which existence occurs" is 'that substratum which maintains the continuity of the individual throughout that life.' The Sarvastivadins had a similar term, nikayasabhagata. This concept is similar to the Yogacara doctrine of the storehouse consciousness (alayavijnana), which was later associated with the Buddha nature doctrine.

This problem was also taken up by a group of Buddhist schools termed the Pudgalavadins or "Personalists" which included the Vātsīputrīya, the Dharmottarīya, the Bhadrayānīya, the Sammitiya and the Shannagarika. These schools posited the existence of a 'person' (pudgala) or self, which had a real existence that was not reducible to streams and collections of dharmas. They also often used other terms to refer to this real 'self', such as 'Atman' and 'Jiva' which are words for the immortal soul in Hinduism and Jainism respectively. They seemed to have held that the 'self' was part of a fifth category of existence, the “inexpressible”. This was a radically different view than the not-self view held by the mainstream Buddhist schools and this theory was a major point of controversy and was thoroughly attacked by other Buddhist schools such as the Theravadins, Sarvastivadins and later Mahayanists.

The Sarvastivadin Abhidharmikas also developed the novel idea of an intermediate state between death and the next rebirth. The Purvasaila, Sammitiya, Vatsiputriya, and later Mahisasaka schools accepted this view, while the Theravadins, Vibhajyavada, Mahasanghika, and the Sariputrabhidharmasastra of the Dharmaguptakas rejected it.

=== Atomism ===
Some Abhidharmikas such as the Sarvastivadins also defended an atomic theory. However unlike the Hindu Vaisheshika school, Abhidharmic atoms (paramannu) are not permanent, but momentary. The Vaibhasika held that an atom is the smallest analyzable unit of matter (rupa), hence it is a 'conceptual atom' (prajnapti-paramanu), though this also corresponds to a real existing thing. The Mahabhivasa states:

"An atom (paramänu) is the smallest rüpa. It cannot be cut, broken, penetrated; it cannot be taken up, abandoned, ridden on, stepped on, struck or dragged. It is neither long nor short, square nor round, regular nor irregular, convex nor concave. It has no smaller parts; it cannot be decomposed, cannot be seen, heard, smelled, touched. It is thus that the paramänu is said to be the finest (sarva-süksma) of all rüpas."

== Theravāda Abhidhamma ==
The Abhidhamma Piṭaka is the third pitaka, or basket, of the Tipitaka (Sanskrit: Tripiṭaka), the canon of the Theravāda school. It consists of seven sections or books. There are also three Abhidhamma type texts which are found in the Khuddaka Nikāya (‘Minor Collection’): Paṭisambhidāmagga, Nettipakaraṇa and the Peṭakopadesa.

The Abhidhamma Piṭaka, like the rest of the Theravāda Tipiṭaka, was orally transmitted until the 1st century BCE. Due to famines and constant wars, the monks responsible for recording the oral tradition felt that there was a risk of portions of the canon being lost so the Abhidhamma was written down for the first time along with the rest of the Pāli Canon in the first century BCE. The books of the Abhidhamma Piṭaka were translated into English in the 20th century and published by the Pāli Text Society. In addition to the canonical Abhidharma, Pali literature includes a variety of Abhidhamma commentaries and introductory manuals written after the compilation of the Abhidhamma Piṭaka. These post-canonical texts attempted to expand and further clarify the analysis presented in the Abhidhamma.

The most influential of these commentaries are those of Buddhaghosa (c. 5th century) a South Indian exegete and philosopher who moved to Sri Lanka and wrote various commentaries and treatises in Pali. His Visuddhimagga ("Path of Purification") is a comprehensive manual of Buddhist practice that also contains an overview of the Abhidhamma. This text remains one of the most popular Abhidhamma influenced texts in Theravada.

Sri Lankan Theravādins also composed shorter introductory manuals to the Abhidhamma. The most popular and widely used of these remains the Abhidhammatthasangaha (Compendium of the Topics of the Abhidharma) by Anuruddha (circa 8th to 12th century). A further period of medieval Sri Lankan scholarship also produced a series of texts called the sub-commentaries (which are commentaries to the commentaries).

Abhidhamma remains a living tradition in Theravāda nations today and modern Abhidhamma works continue to be written in modern languages such as Burmese and Sinhala. Abhidhamma studies are particularly stressed in Myanmar, where it has been the primary subject of study since around the 17th century. One of the most important figures in modern Myanmar Buddhism, Ledi Sayadaw (1846–1923), was well known for his writings on Abhidhamma (especially his commentary on the Abhidhammatthasangaha, called the Paramatthadipanitika).

== Sarvāstivāda Abhidharma ==
The most influential Indian Abhidharma tradition was that of the Sarvāstivāda Vaibhāṣika school, which was dominant in North India, especially Kashmir and also in Bactria and Gandhara. This is the Abhidharma tradition that is studied in East Asian Buddhism and also in Tibetan Buddhism.

Like the Theravada Abhidharma, the Sarvāstivāda Abhidharma Pitaka also consists of seven texts, but they are quite different works, unlike the Sarvāstivāda Agamas, which are very close, often identical, to the suttas of the Theravada Sutta Pitaka. According to Frauwallner however, the two Abhidharma collections share an "ancient core", which is basically an early doctrinal list of dharmas. The core canonical work of this school, the Jñānaprasthāna ('Foundation of Knowledge'), also known as Aṣṭaskandha or Aṣṭagrantha, was said to be composed by master Kātyāyanīputra. This became the basis for the Abhidharma Mahāvibhāṣa Śāstra ("Great Commentary"), an encyclopedic work which became the central text of the Vaibhāṣika tradition who became the Kasmiri Sarvāstivāda Orthodoxy under the patronage of the Kushan Empire.

Despite numerous variations and doctrinal disagreements within the tradition, most Sarvāstivāda-Vaibhāṣikas were united in their acceptance of the doctrine of "sarvāstitva" (all exists), which says that all phenomena in the three times (past, present and future) can be said to exist. Another defining Vaibhāṣika doctrine was that of simultaneous causation (sahabhū-hetu).

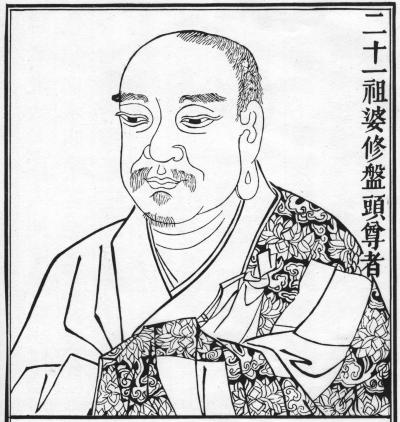
Vasubandhu's Abhidharmakośabhāsya is a major source in Tibetan and East Asian Buddhism.

In addition to the core Vaibhāṣika Abhidharma literature, a variety of expository texts or treatises were written to serve as overviews and introductions to the Abhidharma. The oldest one of these was the Abhidharma-hṛdaya-sastra (The Heart of Abhidharma), by the Tocharian Dharmasresthin, (c. 1st. century B.C.). This text became the model for most of the later treatises.

The most influential of these treatises however, is certainly the Abhidharmakośabhāsya (Treasury of Higher Knowledge, 5th century), a series of verses and accompanying commentary by Vasubandhu. It often critiques Vaibhāṣika views from a Sautrantika perspective. The Sautrantikas were a dissent group within the Sarvāstivāda tradition that rejected many of the core Vaibhāṣika views. This text remains the main source for Abhidharma in Indo-Tibetan and East Asian Buddhism.

The most mature and refined form of Vaibhāṣika philosophy can be seen in the work of master Saṃghabhadra (ca fifth century CE), "undoubtedly one of the most brilliant Abhidharma masters in India". His two main works, the *Nyāyānusāra (Shun zhengli lun 順正理論) and the *Abhidharmasamayapradīpikā (Apidamo xian zong lun 阿毘達磨顯宗論), are key sources of late Vaibhāṣika Abhidharma.

== Other Abhidharma traditions ==
The Śāriputra Abhidharma Śāstra (舍利弗阿毘曇論 Shèlìfú Āpítán Lùn) (T. 1548) is a complete abhidharma text that is thought to come from the Dharmaguptaka sect. The only complete edition of this text is that in Chinese. Sanskrit fragments from this text have been found in Bamiyan, Afghanistan, and are now part of the Schøyen Collection (MS 2375/08). The manuscripts at this find are thought to have been part of a monastery library of the Mahāsāṃghika Lokottaravāda sect.

Several Pudgalavada Abhidharma type texts also survive in Chinese, such as the Traidharmakasastra (Taisho no. 1506 pp. 15c-30a) and the Sammatiyanikayasastra. These texts contain traditional Abhidharma type lists and doctrines, but they also expound and defend the Pudgalavada doctrine of the "person" (pudgala).

Many Abhidharma texts have been lost—likely more than have survived. This includes texts brought from India by Xuanzang belonging to a variety of Indian schools that were never translated into Chinese. Many Abhidharma sastras discovered among the Gandharan Buddhist texts have no parallel in existing Indic languages or Chinese or Tibetan translation, suggesting the former breadth of Abhidharma literature.

According to some sources, abhidharma was not accepted as canonical by the Mahāsāṃghika school. The Theravādin Dīpavaṃsa, for example, records that the Mahāsāṃghikas had no abhidharma. However, other sources indicate that there were such collections of abhidharma. During the early 5th century, the Chinese pilgrim Faxian is said to have found a Mahāsāṃghika Abhidharma at a monastery in Pāṭaliputra. When Xuanzang visited Dhānyakaṭaka, he wrote that the monks of this region were Mahāsāṃghikas, and mentions the Pūrvaśailas specifically. Near Dhānyakaṭaka, he met two Mahāsāṃghika bhikṣus and studied Mahāsāṃghika abhidharma with them for several months, during which time they also studied various Mahāyāna śāstras together under Xuanzang's direction. On the basis of textual evidence as well as inscriptions at Nāgārjunakoṇḍā, Joseph Walser concludes that at least some Mahāsāṃghika sects probably had an abhidharma collection, and that it likely contained five or six books.

== Tattvasiddhi Śāstra ==
The Tattvasiddhi Śāstra ("the treatise that accomplishes reality"; Chinese: 成實論, Chéngshílun), is an extant Abhidharma text which was popular in Chinese Buddhism. This Abhidharma is now contained in the Chinese Buddhist canon, in sixteen fascicles (Taishō Tripiṭaka 1646). Its authorship is attributed to Harivarman, a third-century monk from central India. This work may belong to the Mahāsāṃghika Bahuśrutīya school or to the Sautrāntika school.

Paramārtha cites this Bahuśrutīya abhidharma as containing a combination of Hīnayāna and Mahāyāna doctrines, and Joseph Walser agrees that this assessment is correct. Ian Charles Harris also characterizes the text as a synthesis of Hīnayāna and Mahāyāna, and notes that its doctrines are very close to those in Mādhyamaka and Yogācāra works. The Tattvasiddhi Śāstra maintained great popularity in Chinese Buddhism, and even lead to the formation of its own school of Buddhism in China, the Chéngshí school (成實宗), which was founded in 412 CE. As summarized by Nan Huai-Chin:

Various Buddhist schools sprang to life, such as the school based on the three Mādhyamaka śāstras, the school based on the Abhidharmakośa, and the school based on the Tattvasiddhi Śāstra. These all vied with each other, producing many wondrous offshoots, each giving rise to its own theoretical system.

The Chéngshí School taught a progression of twenty-seven stations for cultivating realization, based upon the teachings of this text. They took Harivarman as its founder in India, and Kumārajīva as the school's founder in China. The Chéngshí School is counted among the ten schools of Tang dynasty Buddhism. From China, the Chéngshí School was transmitted to Japan in 625 CE, where it was known as Jōjitsu-shu (成實宗). This school is known as one of the six great schools of Japanese Buddhism in the Nara period (710–794 CE).

== Mahāyāna Abhidharma ==
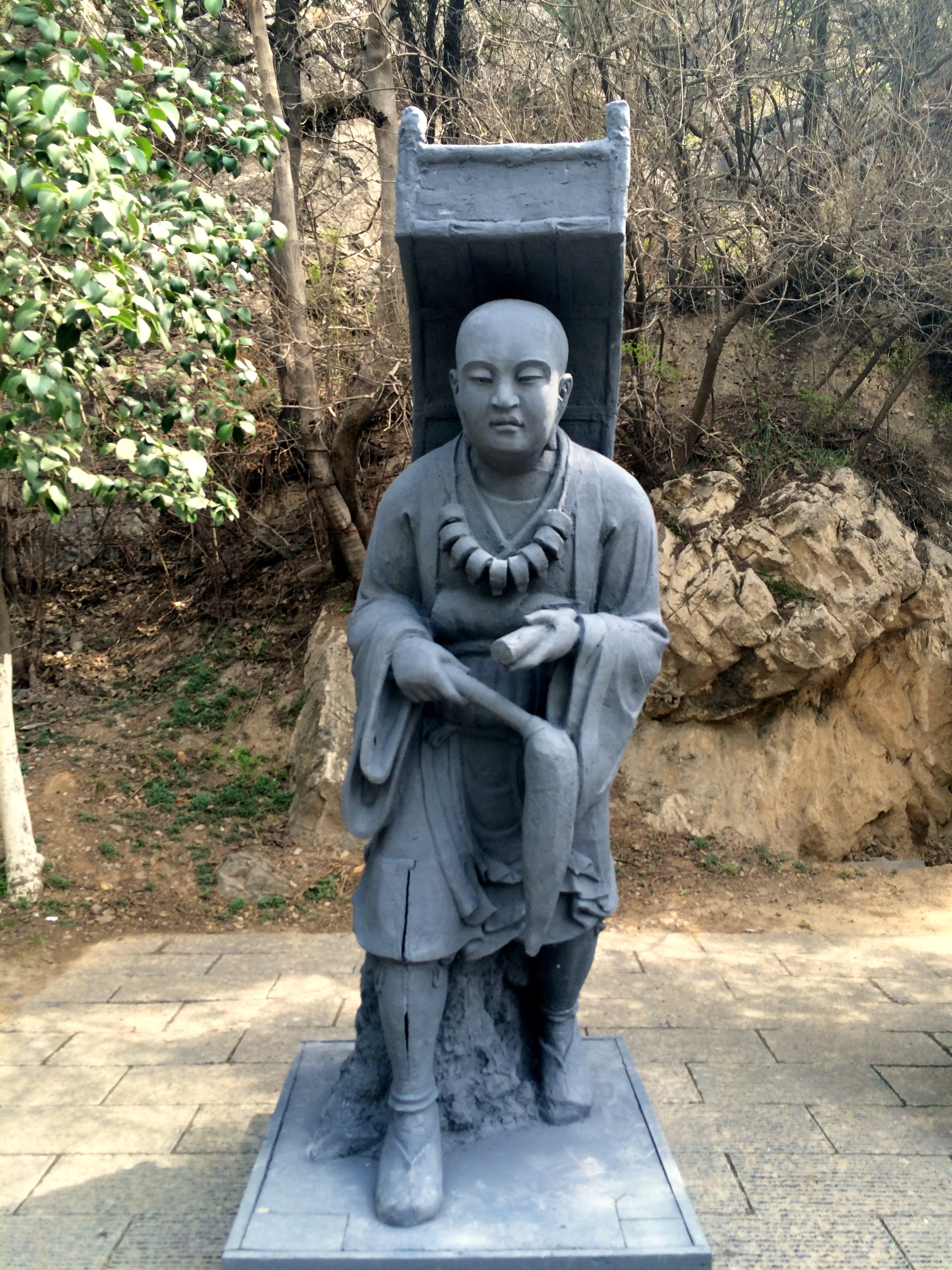
Statue of Xuanzang, the Chinese monk who brought and translated many Yogācāra Abhidharma texts to China.

Another complete system of Abhidharma thought is elaborated in certain works of the Mahāyāna Yogācāra tradition (which mainly evolved out of the Sarvāstivāda Abhidharma). This Yogācāra Abhidharma can be found in the works of figures like Asanga, Vasubandhu, Sthiramati, Dharmapāla, Śīlabhadra, Xuanzang (Hsüan-tsang), and Vinītadeva.

Yogācāra Abhidharmikas discussed many concepts not widely found in non-Mahāyāna Abhidharma, such as the theory of the eight consciousnesses (aṣṭa vijñānakāyāḥ) which includes the novel ālayavijñāna, the three natures (trisvabhāva), mere cognizance (vijñapti-mātra), the fundamental revolution of the basis (āśraya-parāvṛtti), the Mahāyāna buddhology of the three bodies of the Buddha, the ten pāramitā and the ten bhūmi.

Main Yogācāra Abhidharma works include:

- Yogācārabhūmi-Śāstra (Treatise on the Foundation for Yoga Practitioners). A compendium of doctrine and Buddhist meditation, with a strong influence from the Sarvāstivāda Abhidharma.
- Abhidharma-samuccaya ("Compendium of Abhidharma") by Asanga. It mainly discusses traditional Abhidharma concepts, with a few Mahāyāna elements added. According to Frauwallner, this text is based on the Abhidharma of the Mahīśāsaka tradition.
- Abhidharma-samuccaya-bhasyam, a commentary on the work above, possibly by Sthiramati.
- Abhidharmamahāyānasūtra
- Mahāyānasaṃgraha. This is a true compendium of Mahāyāna (Yogācāra) Abhidharma by Asanga. Its main sources are the Abhidharmamahāyānasūtra, and the Yogācārabhūmi.
- Mahāyānasaṃgraha-bhāṣya, by Vasubandhu, a commentary on the work above.
- Vijñapti-mātratā-siddhi, Ch. Cheng Weishi Lun ("Discourse on the Perfection of Consciousness-only") by Xuanzang – a commentary on Vasubandhu's Triṃśikā-vijñaptimātratā ("Thirty Verses")
- Cheng weishi lun shuji, a commentary on the above, by Xuanzang's student Kuiji.

While this Yogācārin Abhidharma is based on the Sarvāstivādin system, it also incorporates aspects of other Abhidharma systems and present a complete Abhidharma in accordance with a Mahāyāna Yogācāra view that thought (vijñapti) alone is ultimately "real." The Yogācāra Abhidharma texts served as the foundations of the East Asian "Consciousness Only school" (Wéishí-zōng).

Yogācārins developed an Abhidharma literature set within a Mahāyāna framework. John Keenan, who has translated the Saṃdhinirmocana Sūtra into English, writes:

The Yogācāra masters inherited the mystical approach of the Prajñāpāramitā texts. However, they did not reject the validity of theoretical Abhidharma. Rather they attempted to construct a critical understanding of the consciousness that underlies all meaning, both mystical and theoretical. Their focus was on doctrine, but as it flowed from the practice of meditative centering (yoga), rather than as it was understood in acts of conceptual apprehension.

=== Prajñāpāramitā texts ===
The Prajñāpāramitā sutras and associated literature are influenced by Abhidharma. These texts make use of Abhidharma categories (like the dharma theory), and adopt them or critique them in different ways. Thus, according to Johannes Bronkhorst, the Aṣṭasāhasrikā Prajñāpāramitā, "only makes sense against the historical background of the Abhidharma."

According to Edward Conze, the Prajñāpāramitā sutras were meant to be a criticism of the view held by some of the Abhidharmikas which saw dharmas as real. Conze also notes that the later Prajñāpāramitā sutras have been expanded by the insertion of various doctrinal Abhidharma lists.

There is also plenty of Abhidharma material (mainly Sarvāstivāda) in the Dà zhìdù lùn (The Treatise on the Great Prajñāpāramitā; Chinese: 大智度論, Mahāprajñāpāramitāupadeśa* Taishō Tripiṭaka no. 1509). The Dà zhìdù lùn was translated into Chinese by Kumārajīva (344–413 CE) and his student Sengrui. The work claims it is written by Nāgārjuna (c. 2nd century), but various scholars such as Étienne Lamotte and Paul Demiéville, have questioned this, holding that the author was instead a Sarvāstivāda monk learned in Abhidharma who became a Mahāyānist and wrote this text. It is a very influential text in East Asian Buddhism.

The Abhisamayālaṅkāra ("Ornament of/for Realization[s]") also includes numerous Abhidharma type listings, and according to Karl Brunnhölzl, "may be considered as a kind of highly formalized mahāyāna abhidharma presentation of the path and realization (similar to chapters five to eight of the Abhidharmakosa, which are frequently quoted in the AA commentaries)."

== See also ==
Buddhist texts
- Tipitaka
  - Abhidhamma Pitaka
  - Sutta Pitaka
  - Vinaya Pitaka

Buddhist concepts
- Pratitya-samutpada
- Skandha

- Index of Buddhism-related articles

== Sources ==
- Cox, Collett (2003). "Abidharma", in: Buswell, Robert E. ed. Encyclopedia of Buddhism, New York: Macmillan Reference Lib. ISBN 0028657187; pp. 1–7.
- Dutt, Nalinaksha (1978). Buddhist Sects in India, Delhi: Motilal Banarsidass
- Gethin, Rupert (1998), Foundations of Buddhism, Oxford University Press
- Goleman, Daniel (2004). Destructive Emotions: A Scientific Dialogue with the Dalai Lama. NY: Bantam Dell. ISBN 0-553-38105-9.
- Horner, I.B. (1963). The book of discipline Vol. V (Cullavagga), London Luzac.
- Red Pine (2004). The Heart Sutra: The Womb of the Buddhas, Shoemaker 7 Hoard. ISBN 1-59376-009-4
- Karunadasa, Y. (1996). "The Dhamma Theory Philosophical Cornerstone of the Abhidhamma" (PDF). bps.lk. Buddhist Publication Society.
- Rhys Davids, Caroline A. F. ([1900], 2003). Buddhist Manual of Psychological Ethics, of the Fourth Century B.C., Being a Translation, now made for the First Time, from the Original Pāli, of the First Book of the Abhidhamma-Piṭaka, entitled Dhamma-Sangaṇi (Compendium of States or Phenomena). Kessinger Publishing. ISBN 0-7661-4702-9. Internet Archive
- Rhys Davids, Caroline A. F. (1914). Buddhist Psychology: An Inquiry into the Analysis and Theory of Mind in Pali Literature, London: G. Bell and Sons.
- Takakusu, J. (1905). "On the Abhidhamma books of the Sarvastivadins", Journal of the Pali Text Society, pp. 67–146
- Trungpa, Chogyam (1975, 2001). Glimpses of Abhidharma: From a Seminar on Buddhist Psychology. Boston, MA: Shambhala Publications. ISBN 1-57062-764-9.
