= Sangitiparyaya =

Sangitiparyaya (Sanskrit: संगीतिपर्याय, IAST: Sangītiparyāya) or Samgiti-paryaya-sastra (संगीतिपर्याय शास्त्र, "recitation together") is one of the seven Sarvastivada Abhidharma Buddhist scriptures. It was composed by Mahakausthila (according to the Sanskrit and Tibetan sources) or Sariputra (according to the Chinese sources). The Chinese recension was translated by Xuanzang: T26, No. 1536, 阿毘達磨集異門足論, 尊者舍利子說, 三藏法師玄奘奉 詔譯, in 20 fascicles.

Structurally, the Samgiti-paryaya is similar to the Dharma-skandha, though earlier, as the latter is mentioned in the former. It is basically a matrka on the early teachings, arranged in groups of dharmas by number, similar to the Ekottarikagama.

This text, as the name implies, is essentially a commentary on the Samgiti-sutra (T 9, Digha-nikaya no. 33). This also indicates that the contents are more a gathering together and assemblage of the Buddha's Dharma, than any new theory or discussion. The background to the first recital of the Samgiti-sutra, as the Jains fell into disarray after the death of the Mahavir, and the Buddhist Samgha gathered together to recite the core teachings of the Dharma to prevent such a split in their own religion, perhaps indicates the fear of present or impending schism arising in the Samgha on the part of those who compiled this Abhidharma work, some time later. The Samgiti-sutra is also the basis of a commentarial work, in the later Yogacara-bhumi-sastra, some several hundred years later.

Yin Shun notes it being mentioned in the Mulasarvastivada Vinaya-vyakaraṇa, indicating its early inclusion in the Sarvastivada canon. As this text has some 14 references to the Dhatu-skandha, "as the Dhatu-skandha states", it is also clear that this is post-Dhatu-skandha in composition. The Chinese Taisho reverses the order of the two. Obviously they are very closely related.
