= Dharmatrāta =

Dharmatrāta (धर्मत्रात or धर्मतार) or possibly Dharmatara or Dharmatāra, is the name of successive Sarvāstivāda teachers and authors. The name is usually transliterated into Chinese as 達磨多羅 and translated as 法救, which means 'Dharma Rescuer' or 'Dharma Saviour'.

The scholar Lin Li-Kouang (1949: 314–351), who made a detailed analysis of the works attributed to Dharmatrāta and the references to him in other works, etc., concludes that there are three successive Dharmatrāta-s in the literary history of Buddhism:

The first is a master of abhidharma who lived around the second century CE, who made a commentary on the Udānavarga (出曜經, T 212), who belonged to the Dārṣtāntika branch of the Sarvāstivāda, and whose theses are cited in the great Sarvāstivāda commentary *Mahāvibhāṣa (阿毘達磨大毘婆沙論, T 1545), sometimes under the name Dharmatrāta and sometimes simply as “Venerable” (bhadanta).

The second is another master of abhidharma, an orthodox Sarvāstivādin, author of the *Saṃyuktābhidharmasāra (雜阿毘曇心論, T 1552) and commentator of the Pañcavastuka of Vasumitra (五事毘婆沙論, T 1555), who lived at the start of the 4th century CE.

The third is a yogācāra, here in the sense of meditation practitioner, who according to the Chinese was a Dhyāna or Chan master and the author of the meditation manual *Dharmatrāta-dhyānasūtra (達摩多羅禪經, T 618) translated into Chinese between 385 and 520 CE, and who can be assigned to Kashmir towards the start of the fifth century.
