= History of Buddhism in India =

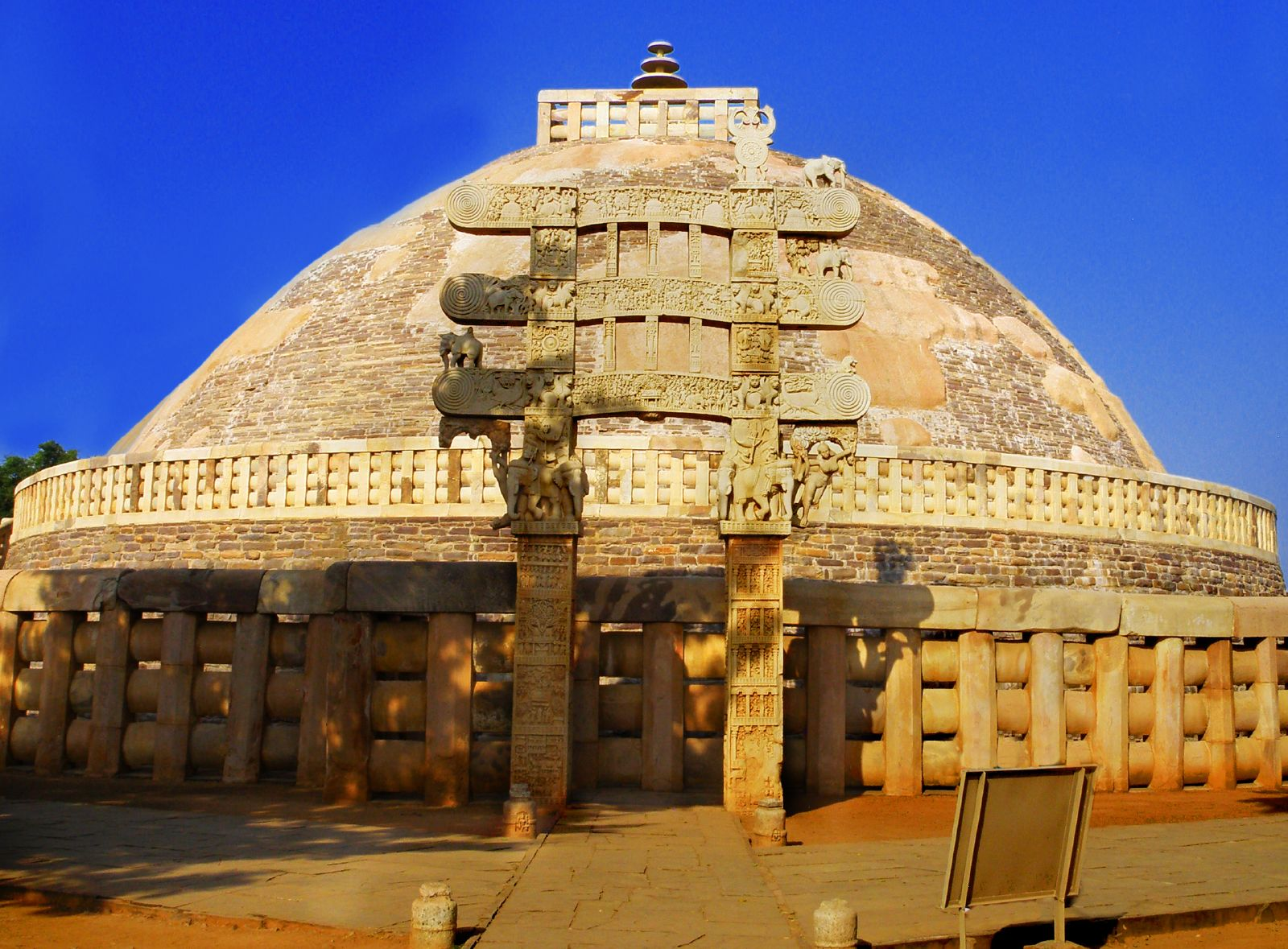
The Great Stupa at Sanchi, located in Sanchi, Madhya Pradesh, is a Buddhist shrine in India built by Ashoka in the 3rd century BCE

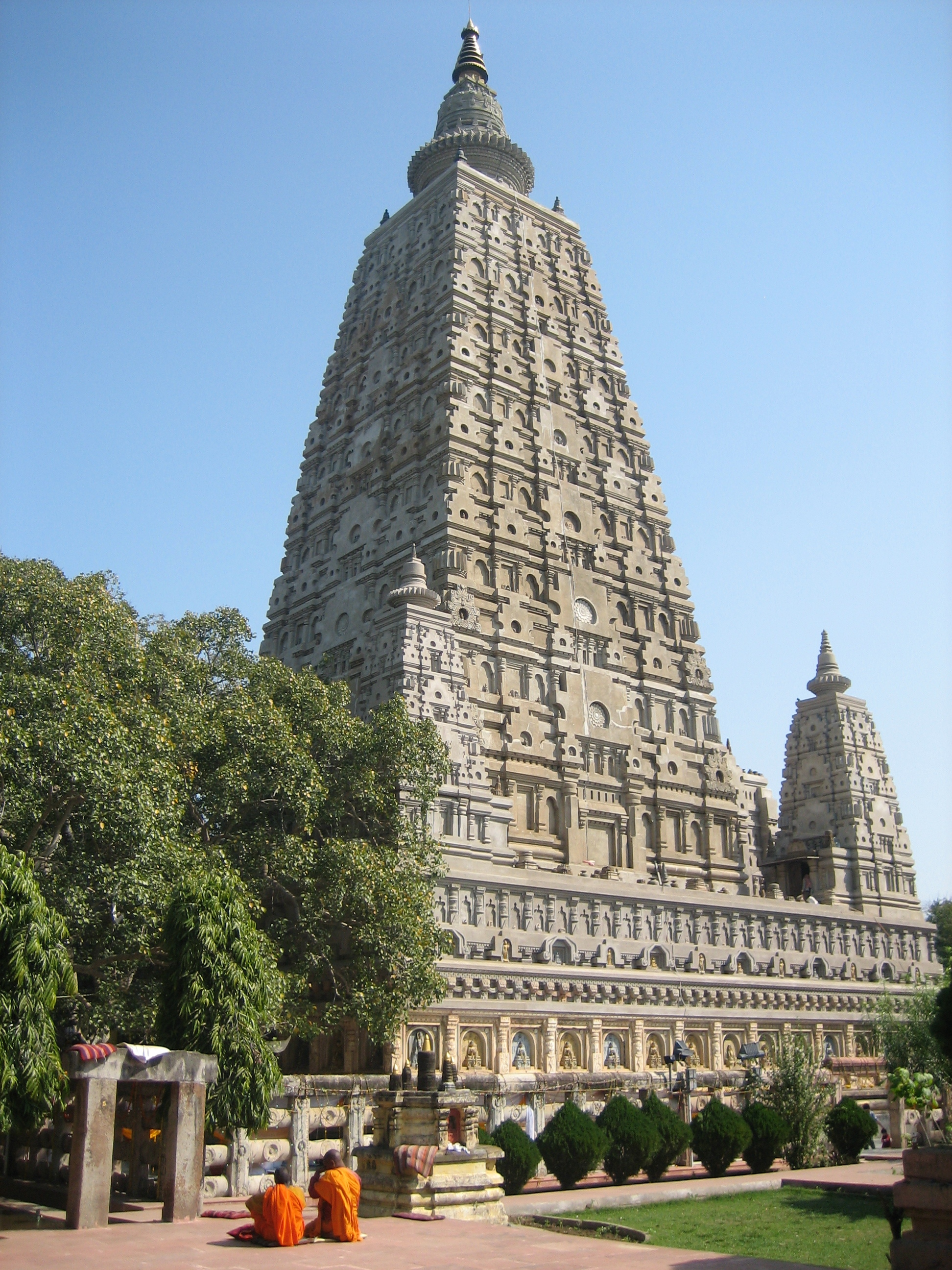
The Mahabodhi Temple, a UNESCO World Heritage Site, is a holy site related to the life of the Buddha, where he attained Enlightenment. The present temple dates from the 5th century or 6th century CE, and it is one of the earliest Buddhist temples built entirely in brick, still standing in India, from the late Gupta period.

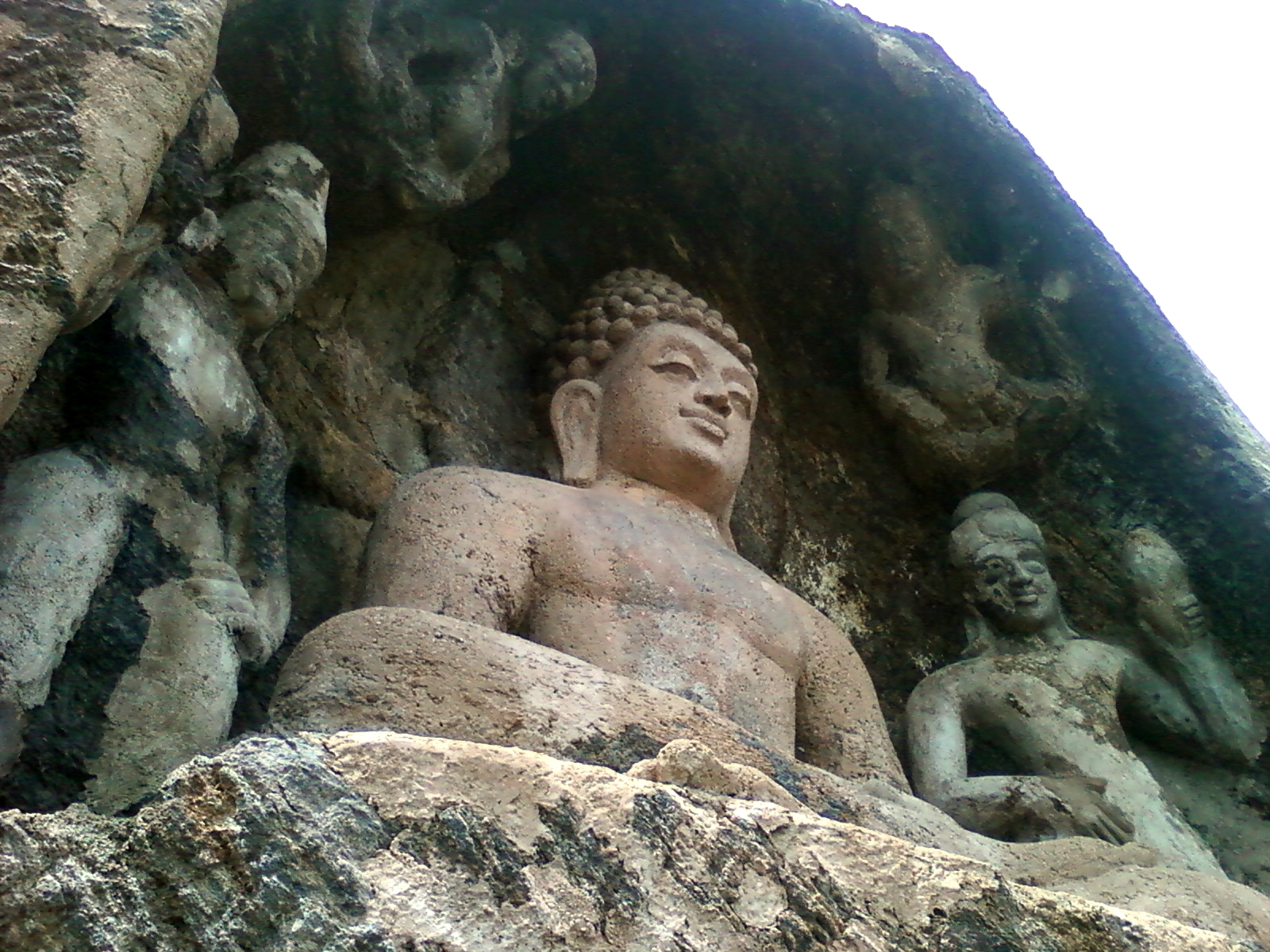
Rock-cut Buddha Statue at Bojjanakonda near Anakapalle of Visakhapatnam, Andhra Pradesh.

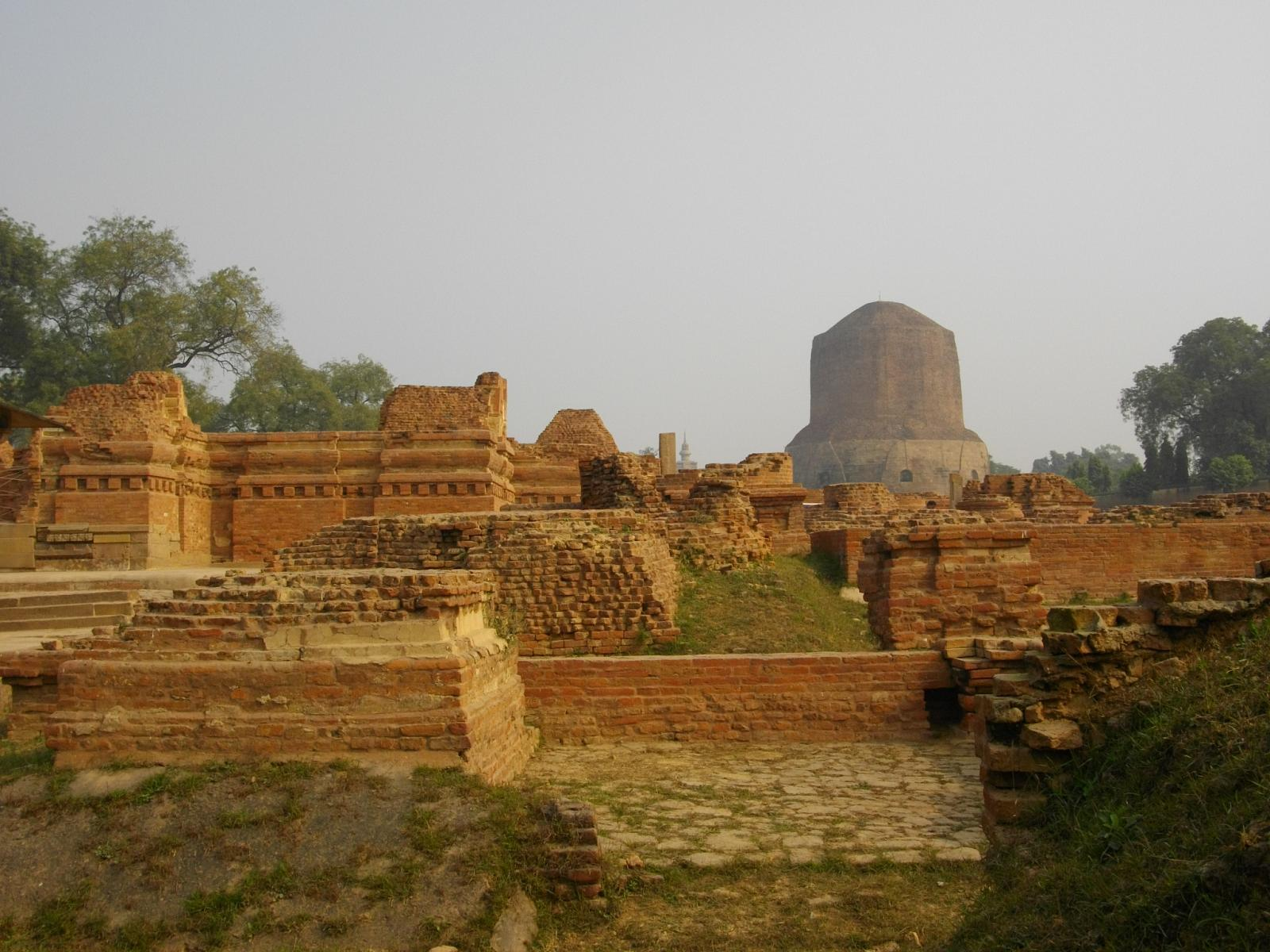
Ancient Buddhist monasteries near Dhamekh Stupa Monument Site in Deer Park at Sarnath (India)

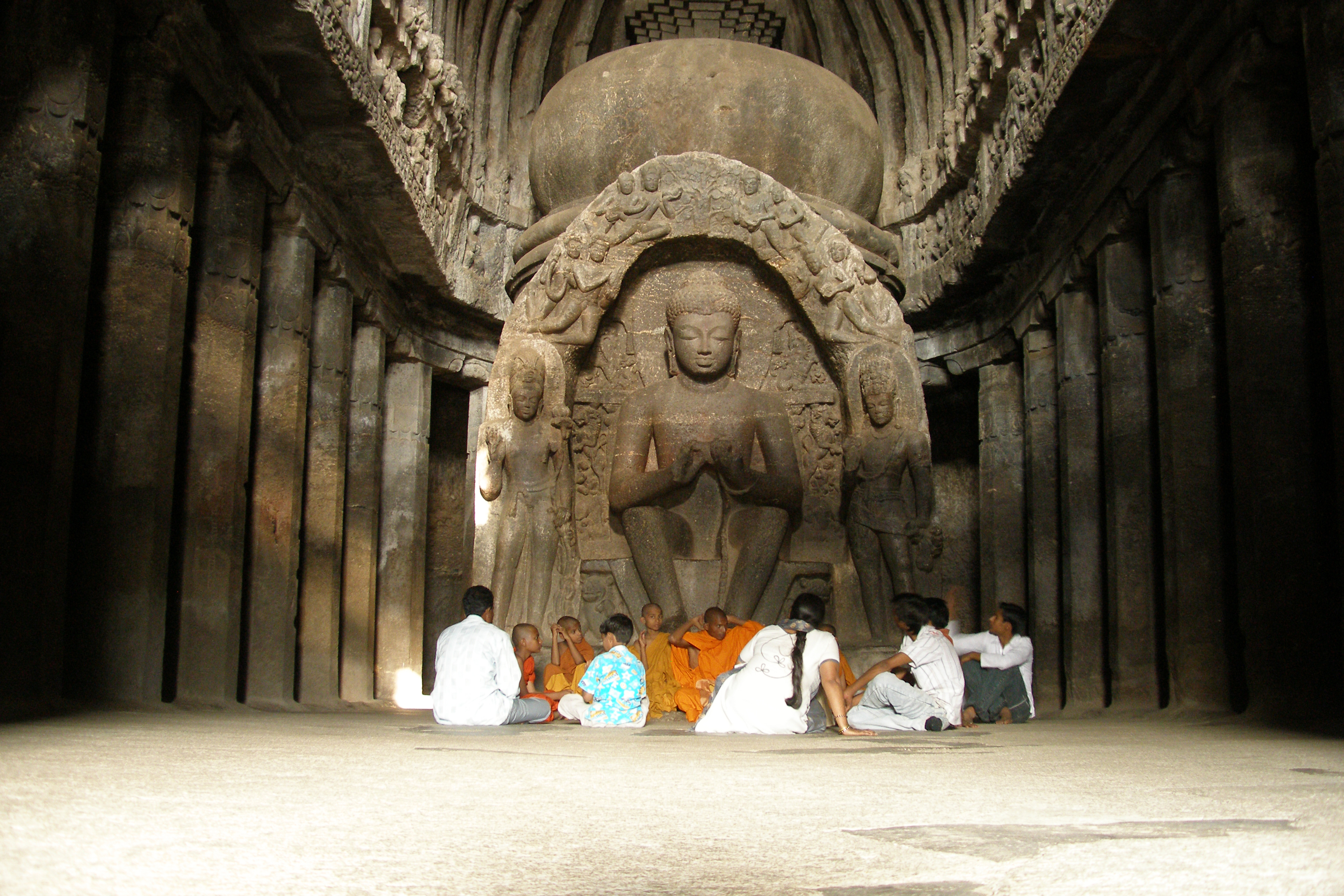
A puja at one of the Buddhist Caves in Ellora.

Buddhism is an ancient Indian religion and philosophy, which arose in and around the ancient Kingdom of Magadha (now Bihar, India). It is based on the teachings of Gautama Buddha (Note: Born as a prince of the ancient Kapilavastu kingdom in ancient India, now in Lumbini, Nepal.), who lived in the 6th or 5th century BCE and was deemed a "Buddha" or an "Awakened One".

In the 3rd century BCE and during the reign of the Mauryan Emperor Ashoka, the Buddhist community split into two schools: the Mahāsāṃghika and the Sthaviravāda, each of which spread throughout India and grew into numerous sub-schools. In modern times, three major branches of Buddhism exist: the Theravada in Sri Lanka and Southeast Asia, and the Mahayana in the Himalayas and East Asia, and the Vajrayana throughout Asia and specifically in Tibet, Nepal, and Bhutan.

The practice of Buddhism lost influence in India around the 7th century CE, after the collapse of the Gupta Empire. The last large empire to support Buddhism was the Pala Empire, that fell in the 12th century. By the end of the 12th century and after the invasions by the Turkic Muslims, Buddhism had largely disappeared from India with the exception of western and central Tibet and isolated remnants in parts of south India.

Since the 19th century, modern revivals of Buddhism have included the Maha Bodhi Society, the Vipassana movement, and the Dalit Buddhist movement spearheaded by B. R. Ambedkar. There has also been a growth in Tibetan Buddhism with the arrival of Tibetan diaspora and the Tibetan government in exile to India, following the Chinese occupation of Tibet in 1950. According to the 2011 census, there are 8.4 million Buddhists in India (0.70% of the total population).

== Background ==
=== Gautama Buddha ===
The Buddha was born to a Kapilavastu head of the Shakya republic named Suddhodana. He employed sramana practices in a specific way, denouncing extreme asceticism and sole concentration-meditation, which were sramanic practices. Instead, he propagated a Middle Way between the extremes of self-indulgence and self-mortification, in which self-restraint and compassion are central elements.

According to tradition, as recorded in the Pali Canon and the Agamas, Siddhārtha Gautama attained awakening sitting under a pipal tree, now known as the Bodhi tree in Bodh Gaya, India. Gautama referred to himself as the tathagata, the "thus-gone"; the developing tradition later regarded him to be as a Samyaksambuddha, a "Perfectly Self-Awakened One." According to tradition, he found patronage in the ruler of Magadha, emperor Bimbisāra. The emperor accepted Buddhism as a personal faith and allowed the establishment of many Buddhist "Vihāras." This eventually led to the renaming of the entire region as Bihar.

According to tradition, in the Deer Park in Sarnath near Vārāṇasī in northern India, Buddha set in motion the Wheel of Dharma by delivering his first sermon to the group of five companions with whom he had previously sought liberation. They, together with the Buddha, formed the first Saṅgha, the company of Buddhist monks, and hence, the first formation of the Triple Gem (Buddha, Dharma and Sangha) was completed.

For the remaining years of his life, the Buddha is said to have travelled in the Gangetic Plain of Northern India and other regions.

Buddha died in Kushinagar, Uttar Pradesh, India. Modern historians place his death, according to tradition at the age of 80, in the decades around 400 BC, several decades later than the date in Buddhist tradition.

=== Adherents ===
Followers of Buddhism called Buddhists in English, referred to themselves as Saugata. Other terms were Sakyans or Sakyabhiksu in ancient India. Sakyaputto was another term used by Buddhists, as well as Ariyasavako and Jinaputto. Buddhist scholar Donald S. Lopez states they also used the term Bauddha. The scholar Richard Cohen in his discussion about the 5th-century Ajanta Caves, states that Bauddha is not attested therein, and was used by outsiders to describe Buddhists, except for occasional use as an adjective.

== Early developments ==
=== Early Buddhist Councils ===
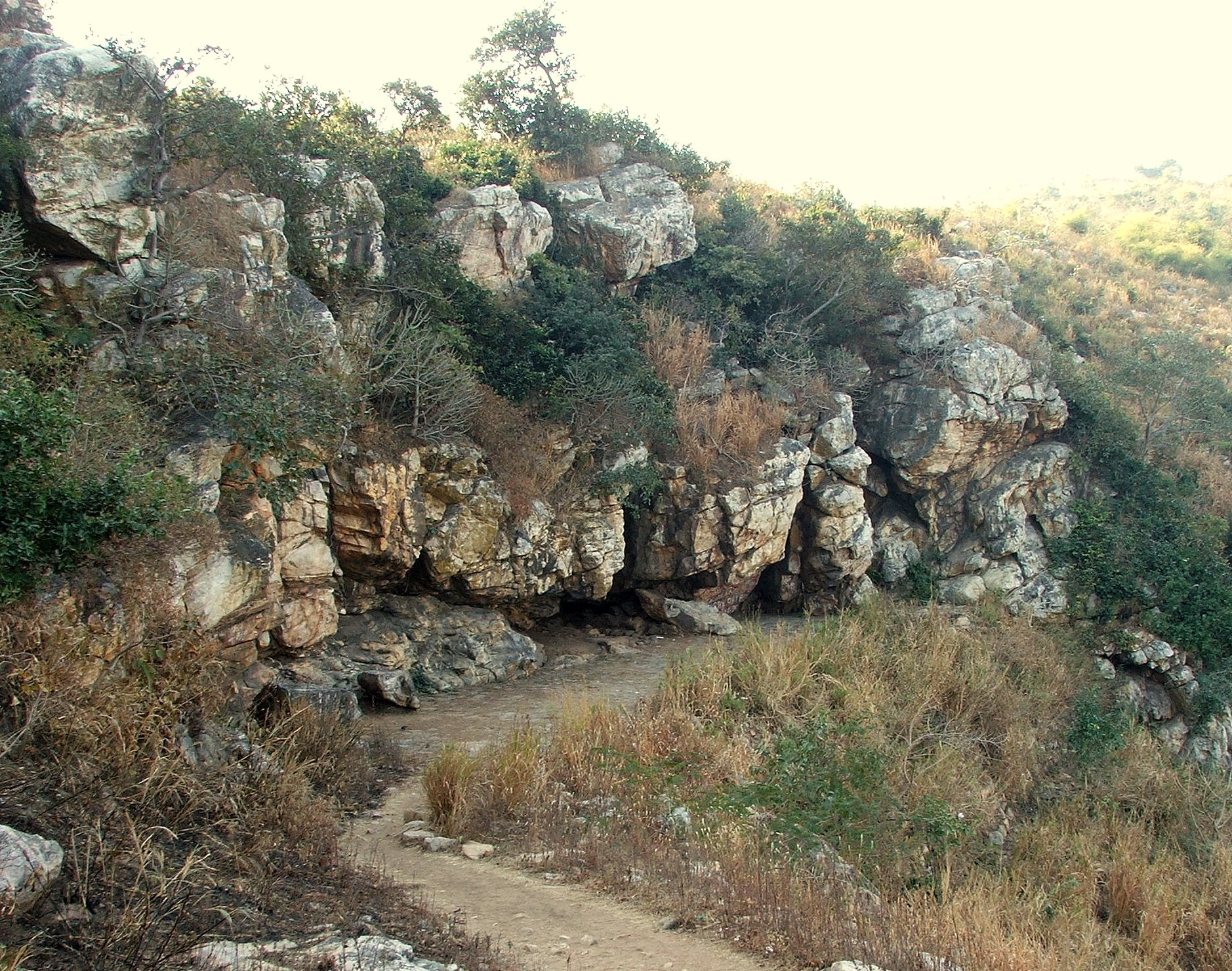
The Saptaparni Cave of Rajgir served as the location for the First Buddhist Council.

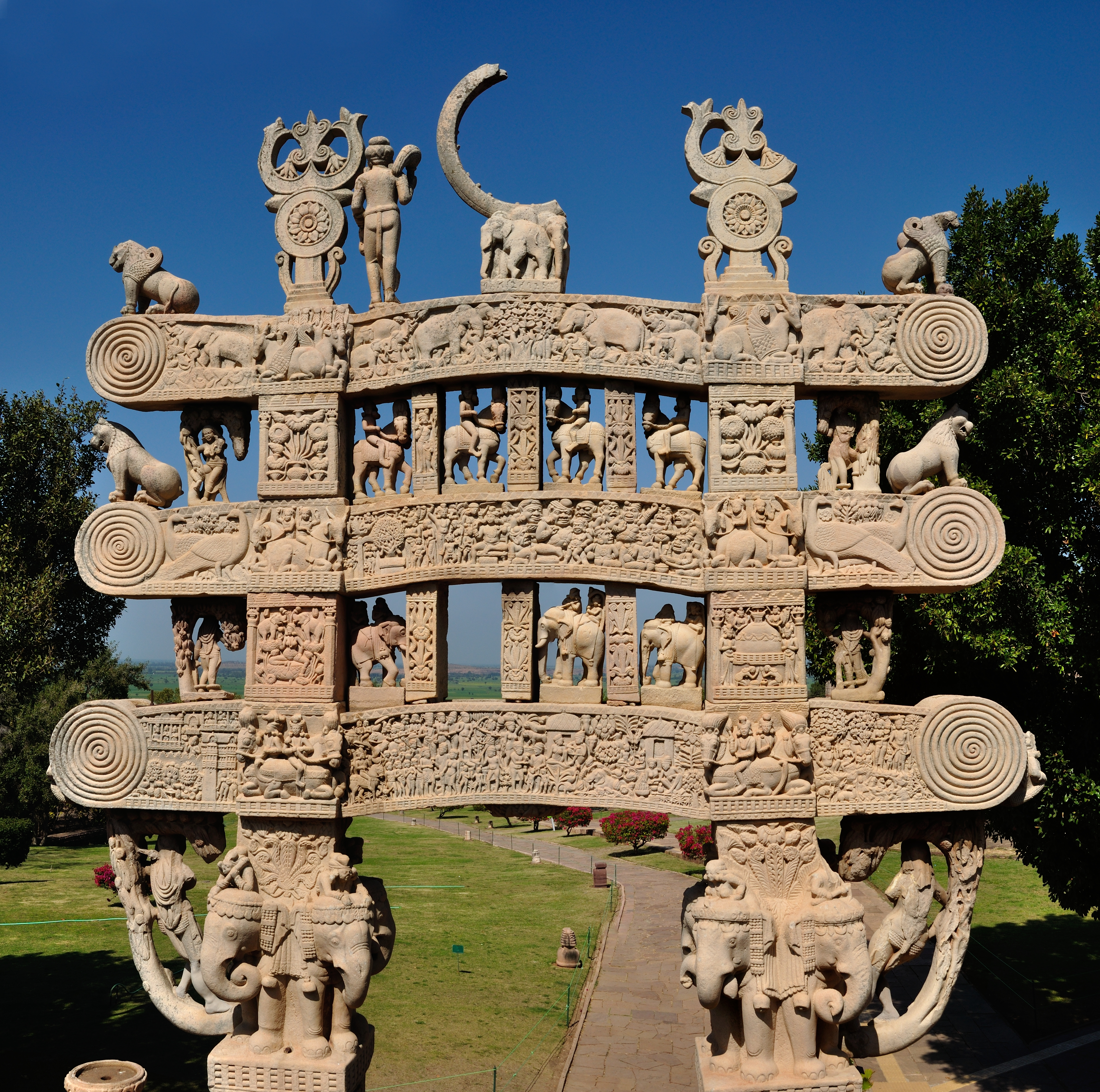
The Northern gateway to the great Stupa of Sanchi.

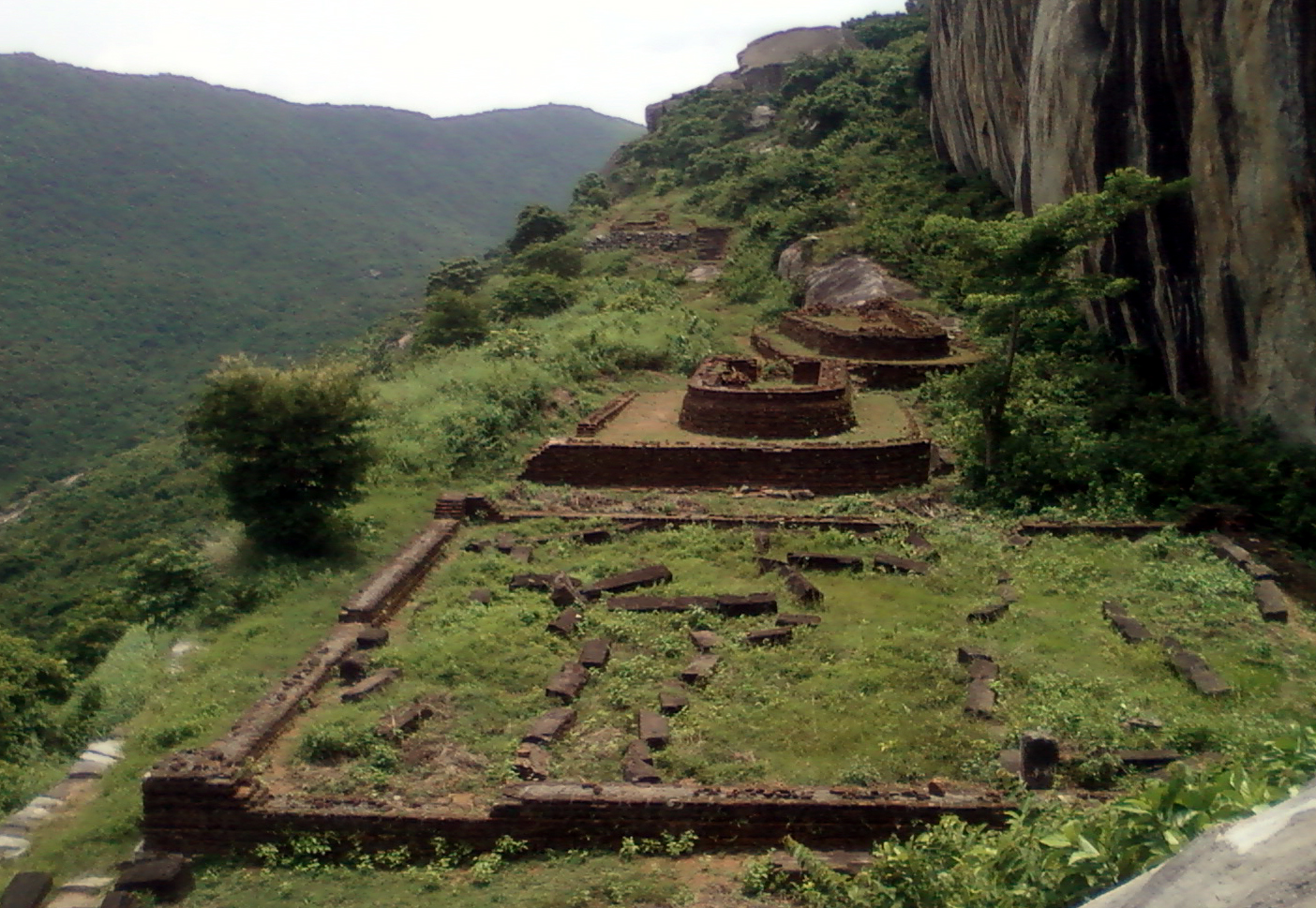
Gurubhaktulakonda Buddhist Monastery Remnants at Ramatheertham

The Buddha did not appoint any successor and asked his followers to work toward liberation following the instructions he had left. The teachings of the Buddha existed only in oral traditions. The Sangha held a number of Buddhist councils in order to reach consensus on matters of Buddhist doctrine and practice.

1. Mahākāśyapa, a disciple of the Buddha, presided over the first Buddhist council held at Rājagṛha. Its purpose was to recite and agree on the Buddha's actual teachings and monastic discipline. Some scholars consider this council fictitious.
2. The Second Buddhist Council is said to have taken place at Vaiśālī. Its purpose was to deal with questionable monastic practices like the use of money, the drinking of palm wine, and other irregularities; the council declared these practices unlawful.
3. What is commonly called the Third Buddhist Council was held at Pāṭaliputra, and was allegedly called by Emperor Aśoka in the 3rd century BC. Organized by the monk Moggaliputta Tissa, it was held in order to rid the sangha of the large number of monks who had joined the order because of its royal patronage. Most scholars now believe this council was exclusively Theravada, and that the dispatch of missionaries to various countries at about this time had nothing to do with it.
4. What is often called the Fourth Buddhist council is generally believed to have been held under the patronage of Emperor Kaniṣka in Kashmir, though the late Monseigneur Professor Lamotte considered it fictitious. It is generally believed to have been a council of the Sarvastivāda school.

=== Early schools of Buddhism ===
The Early Buddhist Schools were the various schools in which pre-sectarian Buddhism split in the first few centuries after the passing away of the Buddha (in about the 5th century BC). The earliest division was between the majority Mahāsāṃghika and the minority Sthaviravāda. Some existing Buddhist traditions follow the vinayas of early Buddhist schools.

- Theravāda: practised mainly in Sri Lanka, Myanmar, Thailand, Cambodia, Laos and Bangladesh.
- Dharmaguptaka: followed in China, Korea, Vietnam, and Taiwan.
- Mūlasarvāstivāda: followed in Tibetan Buddhism.

The Dharmaguptakas made more efforts than any other sect to spread Buddhism outside India, to areas such as Afghanistan, Central Asia, and China, and they had great success in doing so. Therefore, most countries which adopted Buddhism from China, also adopted the Dharmaguptaka vinaya and ordination lineage for bhikṣus and bhikṣuṇīs.

During the early period of Chinese Buddhism, the Indian Buddhist sects recognized as important, and whose texts were studied, were the Dharmaguptakas, Mahīśāsakas, Kāśyapīyas Sarvāstivādins, and the Mahāsāṃghikas. Complete vinayas preserved in the Chinese Buddhist canon include the Mahīśāsaka Vinaya (T. 1421), Mahāsāṃghika Vinaya (T. 1425), Dharmaguptaka Vinaya (T. 1428), Sarvāstivāda Vinaya (T. 1435), and the Mūlasarvāstivāda Vinaya (T. 1442). Also preserved are a set of Āgamas (Sūtra Piṭaka), a complete Sarvāstivāda Abhidharma Piṭaka, and many other texts of the early Buddhist schools.

Early Buddhist schools in India often divided modes of Buddhist practice into several "vehicles" (yāna). For example, the Vaibhāṣika Sarvāstivādins are known to have employed the outlook of Buddhist practice as consisting of the Three Vehicles:

1. Śrāvakayāna
2. Pratyekabuddhayāna
3. Bodhisattvayāna

=== The early spread of Buddhism ===
In the sixth and fifth centuries BC, economic development made the merchant class increasingly important. Merchants were attracted to Buddhist teachings, which contrasted with existing Brahmin religious practices. The latter focused on the social position of the Brahmin caste to the exclusion of the interests of other classes. Buddhism became prominent in merchant communities and then spread throughout the Mauryan empire through commercial connections and along trade routes. In this way, Buddhism also spread through the silk route into central Asia. Bharuka was an ancient Buddhist oasis on the northern Silk Road, located between Śrīkrīrāti and Kucha. It formed part of the trade and Buddhist neorks linking India, Central Asia and the Tarim Basin, allowing monks, texts and ideas to move across the region.

=== Ashoka and the Mauryan Empire ===
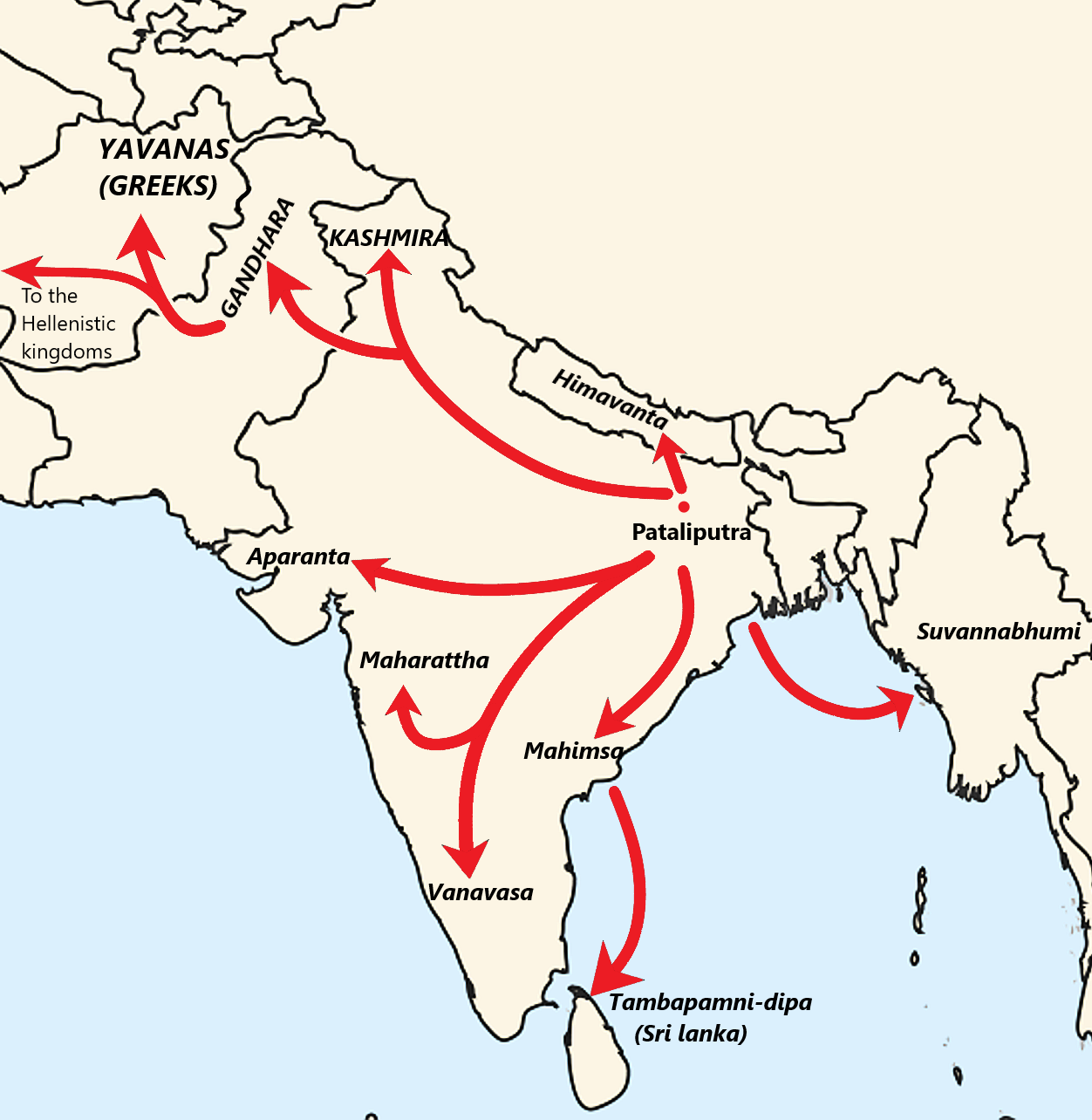
Map of the Buddhist missions in Asia during the reign of Ashoka

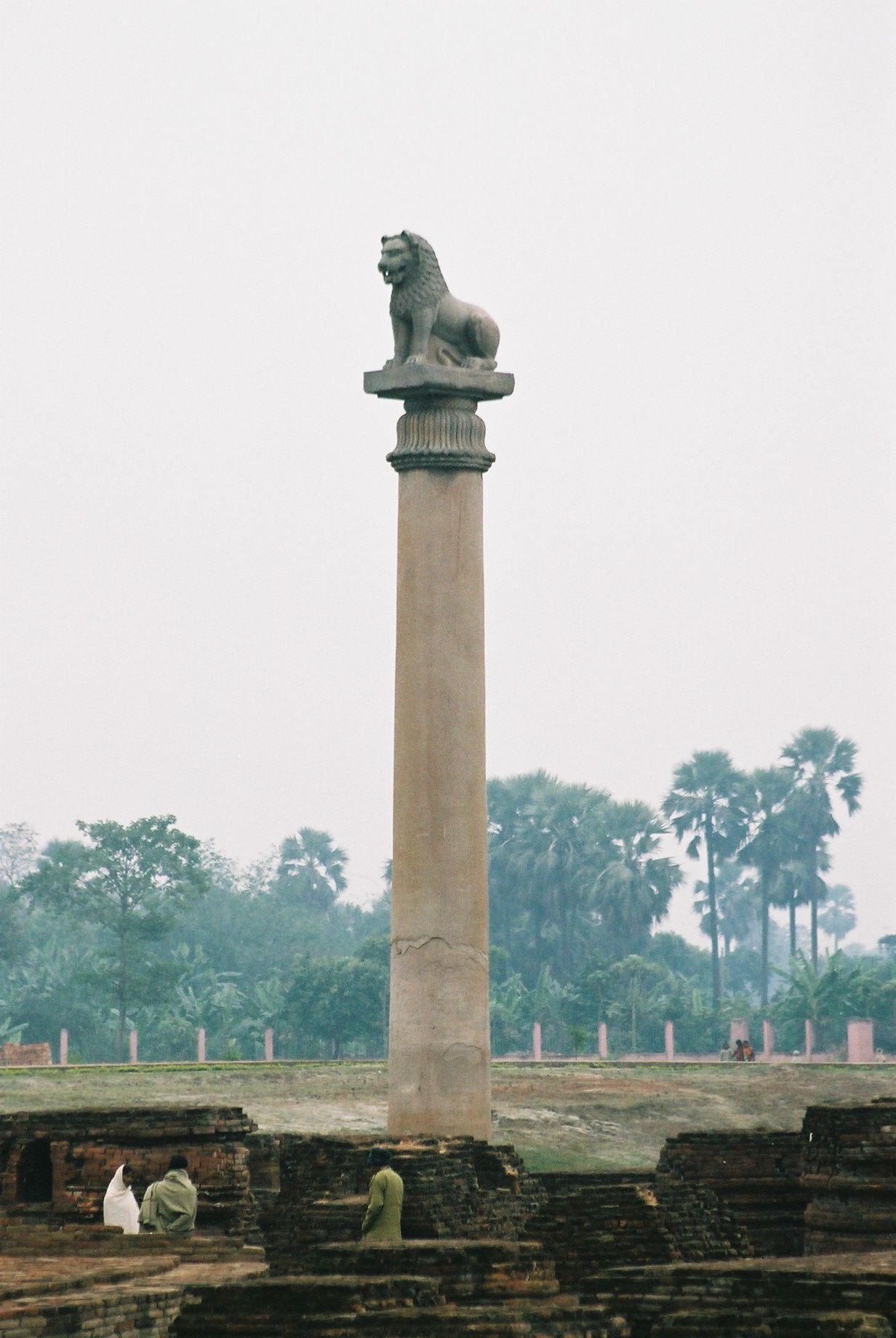
Pillar of Ashoka located in the ancient city of Vaishali, Bihar

The Mauryan Empire reached its peak at the time of emperor Ashoka, who converted to Buddhism after the Battle of Kalinga. This heralded a long period of stability under the Buddhist emperor. The power of the empire was vast—ambassadors were sent to other countries to propagate Buddhism. Greek envoy Megasthenes describes the wealth of the Mauryan capital. Stupas, pillars, and edicts on stone remain at Sanchi, Sarnath, and Mathura, indicating the extent of the empire.

Emperor Ashoka the Great (304 BC–232 BC) was the ruler of the Mauryan Empire from 273 BC to 232 BC. Ashoka reigned over most of India after a series of military campaigns. Emperor Ashoka's kingdom stretched from South Asia and beyond, from present-day parts of Afghanistan in the north and Balochistan in the west, to Bengal and Assam in the east, and as far south as Mysore.

According to legend, emperor Ashoka was overwhelmed by guilt after the conquest of Kalinga, following which he accepted Buddhism as a personal faith with the help of his Brahmin mentors Radhasvami and Manjushri. Ashoka established monuments marking several significant sites in the life of Śakyamuni Buddha, and according to Buddhist tradition was closely involved in the preservation and transmission of Buddhism.

In 2018, excavations in Lalitgiri in Odisha by the Archaeological Survey of India revealed four monasteries along with ancient seals and inscriptions which show cultural continuity from post-Mauryan period to 13 century AD. In Ratnagiri and Konark in Odisha, Buddhist history as discovered in Lalitagiri is also shared. A museum has been made to preserve the ancient history and was inaugurated in December 2018 by Prime Minister Narendra Modi.

=== Graeco-Bactrians, Sakas and Indo-Parthians ===
Menander was the most famous Bactrian king. He ruled from Taxila and later from Sagala (Sialkot). He rebuilt Taxila (Sirkap) and Puṣkalavatī. He became Buddhist and is remembered in Buddhist records due to his discussions with a great Buddhist philosopher in the book Milinda Pañha.

By 90 BC, Parthians took control of eastern Iran and around 50 BC put an end to the last remnants of Greek rule in Afghanistan. By around 7 AD, an Indo-Parthian dynasty succeeded in taking control of Gandhāra. Parthians continued to support Greek artistic traditions in Gandhara. The start of the Gandhāran Greco-Buddhist art is dated to the period between 50 BC and 75 AD.

=== Kushan Empire ===
The Kusana or Kushan Empire ruled large parts of north India from about 60 to 270 AD, as well as the strongly Buddhist region of Gandhara, including much of modern Afghanistan and Pakistan. Kushan rulers were supporters of Buddhist institutions and built numerous stupas and monasteries. Some of their coins showed an image of Buddha. During this period, Gandharan Buddhism spread through the trade routes protected by the Kushans, out through the Khyber Pass into Central Asia. Gandharan Buddhist art styles also spread outward from Gandhara to other parts of Asia.

The monarchs of the next major dynasty, the Gupta Empire, with its peak c. 319 to 467, were Hindus, and the decline of Buddhism, especially in the west of north India, probably began in this period.

== Middle period ==
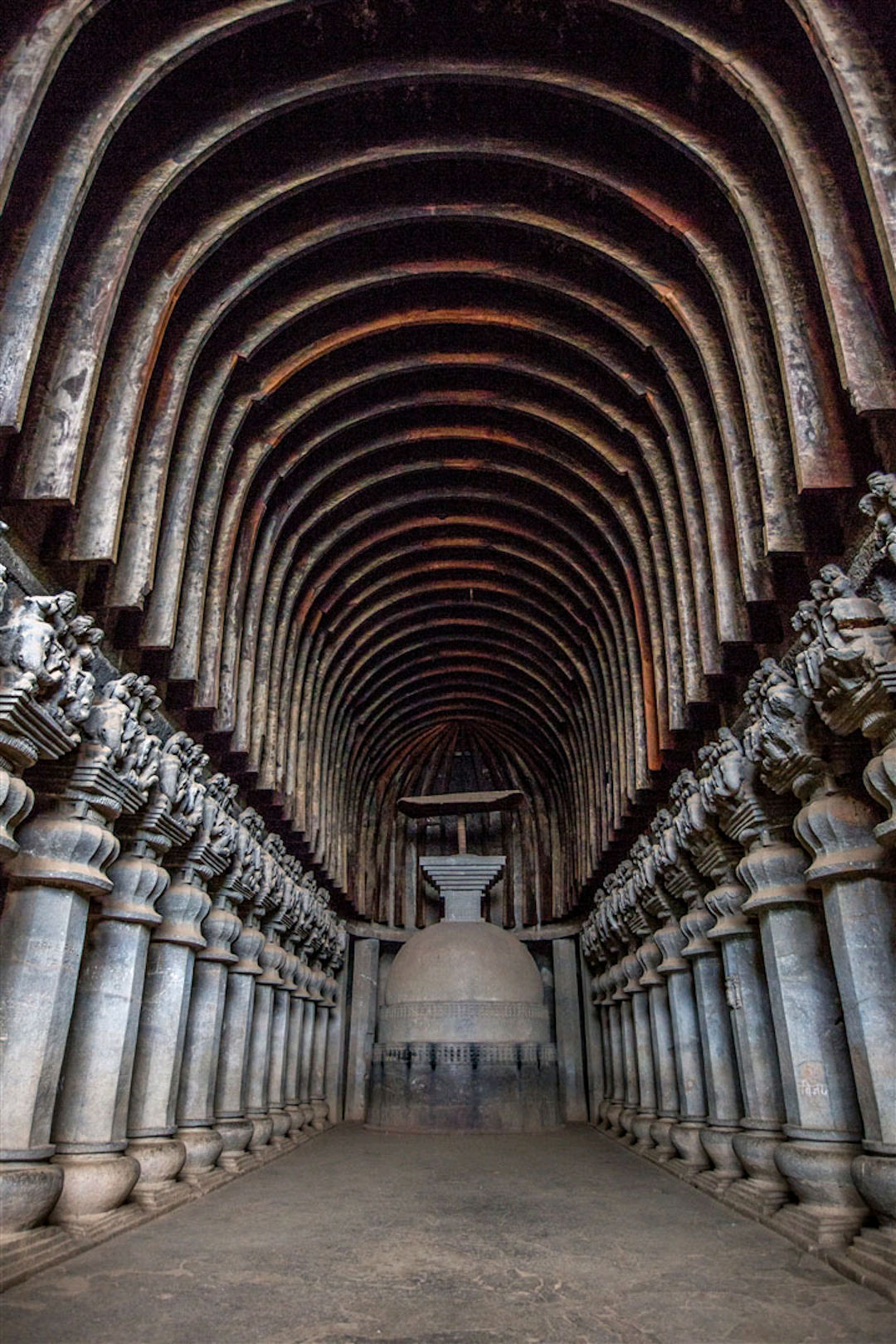
The Great Chaitya in the Karla Caves, Maharashtra. The structure dates back to the 2nd century AD

The first half of the millennium saw the increasing isolation of the Buddhist sangha from the general public as mahaviharas looked to become more self-sufficient. A new development was also the use of Buddha images with the compounds of monasteries. Politically much of North India was under the Gupta Empire and the Southern regions were under the Vakataka dynasty. Both of the kingdoms continued the patronisation of Buddhism along with nascent Hinduism and Jainism, with the fifth-century Vakataka king, Harishena, being a patron of the Ajanta Caves.

=== Emergence of Mahayana ===
Mahayana Buddhism began to gain prominence in India around the fifth century CE. Mahayana innovated on early Buddhism by adding several incarnations to the life of the Buddha while also revering Bodhisattvas. This contrasted with the early Buddhists who mainly revered the Buddha himself. A range of bodhisattvas were worshipped during this period including Avalokiteśvara, Tara and Manjushri among others. Faxian who had travelled to India in the fifth century noted that Mahayana Buddhists lived in the same monasteries as early Buddhists and they were present to varying extents in most regions. An important early philosopher of the Mahayana school was the philosopher Nagarjuna and although most details of his life are uncertain, most biographies agree that he lived in the first/second centuries in South India.

There is an ongoing debate as to the exact geographic origins of Mahayana Buddhism ranging from the Gangetic plains or among small monastic communities on the fringes of the subcontinent in the South and the North East. The number of monasteries that supported Mahayana Buddhism gradually started to increase. In the Gangetic plains, Nalanda mahavihara emerged and gradually became a centre of Mahayana Buddhism receiving patronisation not just from Indian rulers but also from foreign monarchs and monks. Within Nalanda, numerous scholars of note have been associated with it including Shantideva, Aryadeva, Dharmakirti and Chandrakirti.

Another important centre during this period was Nagarjunakonda which emerged in the region of modern-day Andhra Pradesh where numerous Buddhist monasteries have been discovered.

=== Buddha images ===
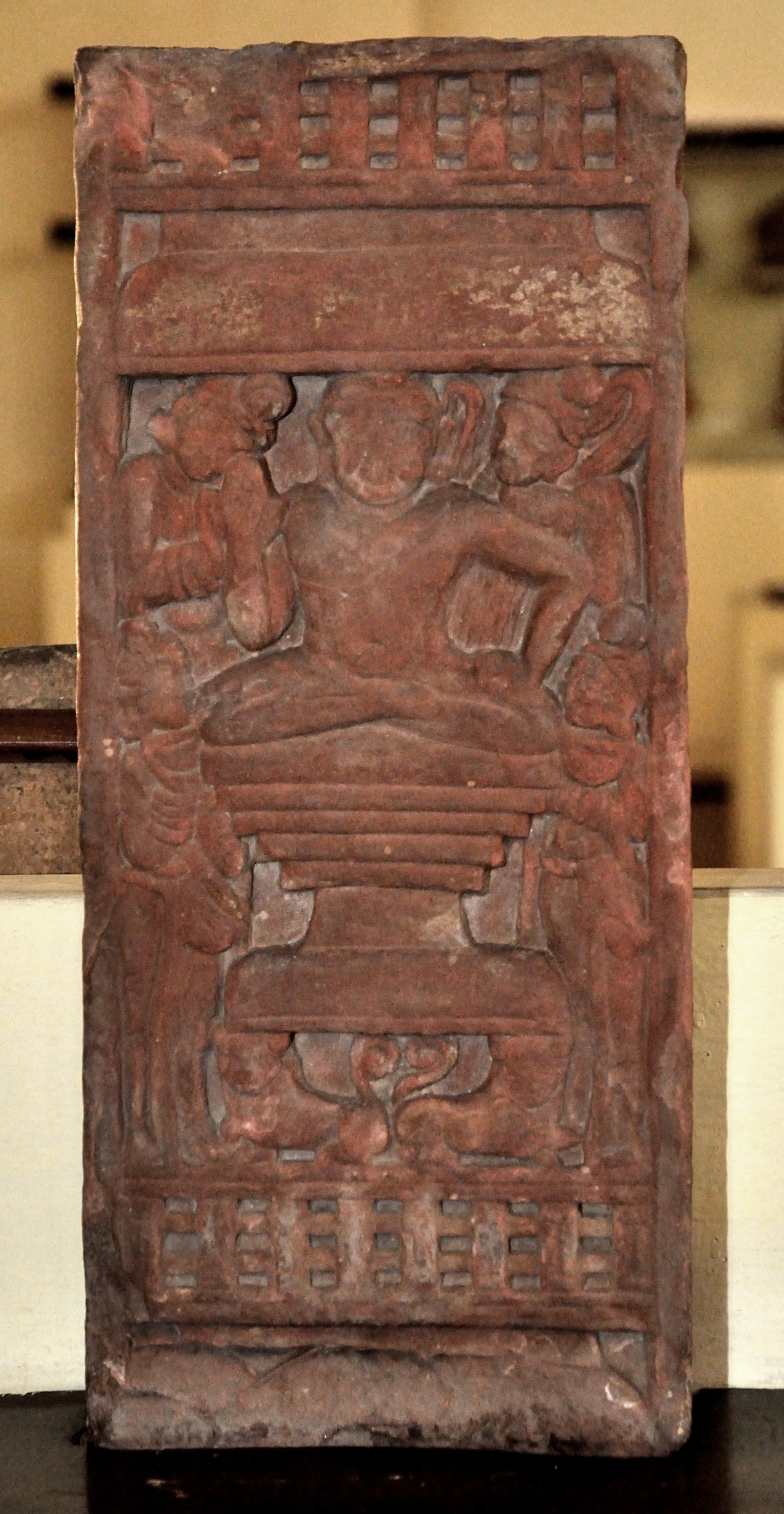
Isapur Buddha, one of the earliest physical depictions of the Buddha, c. 15 CE. Art of Mathura

The earliest Buddha images in India were sculpted in Mathura and spread to Sarnath, Sravasti and Kausambi in the second and third centuries CE. These images generally depicted scenes from the life of the Buddha and were more linked with the early schools of Buddhism than with Mahayana. Inscriptions on these images show that they were sculpted by a small group of monks who were all known to each other. It was only by the fifth century that Mahayana elements began to appear in Buddha images although it is speculated that there were earlier Mahayana images in the third-century CE. These Mahayana sculptures didn't just depict the Buddha but also Bodhisattvas and other deities.

=== Vajrayana ===
Various classes of Vajrayana literature developed as a result of royal courts sponsoring both Buddhism and Shaivism. The Mañjusrimulakalpa, which later came to classified under Kriyatantra, states that mantras taught in the Shaiva, Garuda and Vaishnava tantras will be effective if applied by Buddhists since they were all taught originally by Manjushri. The Guhyasiddhi of Padmavajra, a work associated with the Guhyasamaja tradition, prescribes acting as a Shaiva guru and initiating members into Shaiva Siddhanta scriptures and mandalas. The Samvara tantra texts adopted the pitha list from the Shaiva text Tantrasadbhava, introducing a copying error where a deity was mistaken for a place.

=== The Pala era ===
Under the kings of the Pala Empire (c. 730-1130), large mahavihars flourished in what is now Bihar and Bengal, with considerable royal patronage. Tantric Buddhism dominated in this region and period, and was spread to Tibet. According to Tibetan sources, five great Mahavihars stood out: Vikramashila, the premier university of the era; Nalanda, past its prime but still illustrious, Somapura, Odantapurā, and Jaggadala. The five monasteries formed a network; "all of them were under state supervision" and there existed "a system of co-ordination among them . . it seems from the evidence that the different seats of Buddhist learning that functioned in eastern India under the Pāla were regarded together as forming a network, an interlinked group of institutions," and it was common for great scholars to move easily from position to position among them.

During this period [Pala dynasty] Mahayana Buddhism reached its zenith of sophistication, while tantric Buddhism flourished throughout India and surrounding lands. This was also a key period for the consolidation of the epistemological-logical (pramana) school of Buddhist philosophy. Apart from the many foreign pilgrims who came to India at this time, especially from China and Tibet, there was a smaller but important flow of Indian pandits who made their way to Tibet...

— Damien Keown,

Buddhism never penetrated to deep south.There are not any monuments or records of any beyond south Andhra Pradesh, except few coastal towns where some minor remains have been found.In the 11th century CE, Chudamani Vihara, a Buddhist monastery, was built by the Sailendra king of Srivijaya Sri Mara Vijayattungavarman at Nagapattinam with the patronage of Raja Raja Chola.

== Decline ==
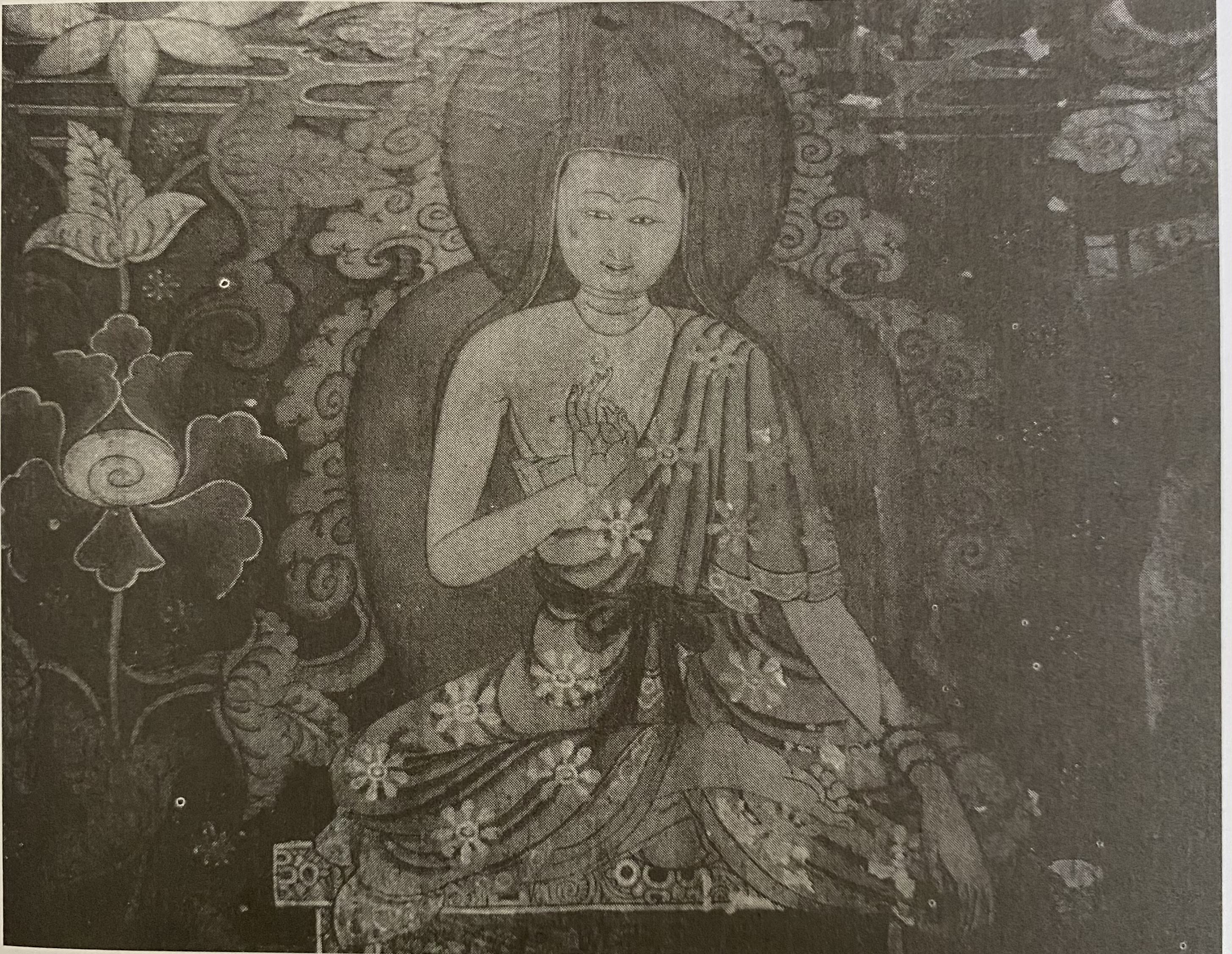
Mural of the 15th century Indian Buddhist monk, Sariputra, the last abbot of Bodh Gaya

The decline of Buddhism has been attributed to various factors. Regardless of the religious beliefs of their kings, states usually treated all the important sects relatively even-handedly. This consisted of building monasteries and religious monuments, donating property such as the income of villages for the support of monks, and exempting donated property from taxation. Donations were most often made by private persons such as wealthy merchants and female relatives of the royal family, but there were periods when the state also gave its support and protection. In the case of Buddhism, this support was particularly important because of its high level of organization and the reliance of monks on donations from the laity. State patronage of Buddhism took the form of land grant foundations.

Numerous copper plate inscriptions from India as well as Tibetan and Chinese texts suggest that the patronage of Buddhism and Buddhist monasteries in medieval India was interrupted in periods of war and political change, but broadly continued in Hindu kingdoms from the start of the common era through early 2nd millennium CE. Modern scholarship and recent translations of Tibetan and Sanskrit Buddhist text archives, preserved in Tibetan monasteries, suggest that through much of the 1st millennium CE in medieval India (and Tibet as well as other parts of China), Buddhist monks owned property and were actively involved in trade and other economic activity, after joining a Buddhist monastery.

With the Gupta dynasty (~4th to 6th century), the growth in ritualistic Mahayana Buddhism, mutual influence between Hinduism and Buddhism, The differences between Buddhism and Hinduism blurred, and Vaishnavism, Shaivism and other Hindu traditions became increasingly popular, and Brahmins developed a new relationship with the state. As the system grew, Buddhist monasteries gradually lost control of land revenue. In parallel, the Gupta kings built Buddhist temples such as the one at Kushinagara, and monastic universities such as those at Nalanda, as evidenced by records left by three Chinese visitors to India.

According to Hazra, Buddhism declined in part because of the rise of the Brahmins and their influence in socio-political process. According to Randall Collins, Richard Gombrich and other scholars, Buddhism's rise or decline is not linked to Brahmins or the caste system, since Buddhism was "not a reaction to the caste system", but aimed at the salvation of those who joined its monastic order.

The 11th-century Persian traveller Al-Biruni writes that there was 'cordial hatred' between the Brahmins and Sramana Buddhists. Buddhism was also weakened by rival Hindu philosophies such as Advaita Vedanta, growth in temples and an innovation of the bhakti movement. This rivalry undercut Buddhist patronage and popular support. The period between 400 CE and 1000 CE thus saw gains by the Vedanta school of Hinduism over Buddhism and Buddhism had vanished from Afghanistan and north India by the early 11th century as a result of the Muslim conquests of Afghanistan and incursions into India.

According to some scholars such as Lars Fogelin, the decline of Buddhism may be related to economic reasons, wherein the Buddhist monasteries with large land grants focused on non-material pursuits, self-isolation of the monasteries, loss in internal discipline in the sangha, and a failure to efficiently operate the land they owned.

=== The Hun invasions ===
Chinese scholars travelling through the region between the 5th and 8th centuries, such as Faxian, Xuanzang, I-ching, Hui-sheng, and Sung-Yun, began to speak of a decline of the Buddhist Sangha, especially in the wake of the Hun invasion from central Asia. Xuanzang, the most famous of Chinese travellers, found "millions of monasteries" in north-western India reduced to ruins by the Huns.

=== Muslim conquerors ===
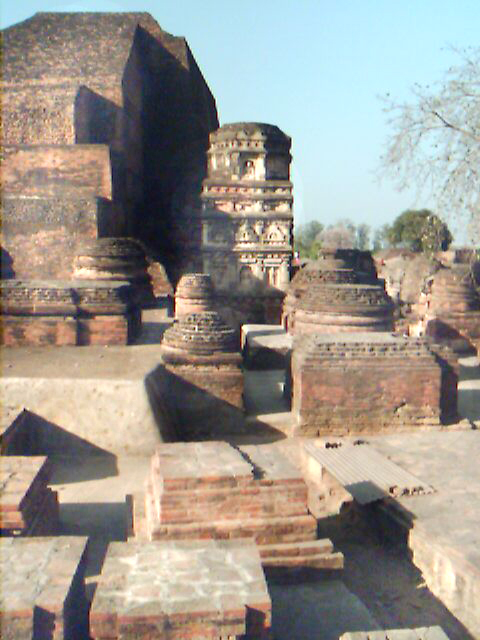
General Ikhtiar Uddin Muhammad Bin Bakhtiyar Khilji sacked the great Buddhist shrines at Nālanda.

The Muslim conquest of the Indian subcontinent was the first great iconoclastic invasion into South Asia. By the end of the twelfth century, Buddhism had mostly disappeared, with the destruction of monasteries and stupas in medieval northwest and western India (now Pakistan and north India).

In the north-western parts of medieval India, the Himalayan regions, as well as regions bordering central Asia, Buddhism had facilitated trade relations, states Lars Fogelin. With the Islamic invasion and expansion, and central Asians adopting Islam, the trade route-derived financial support sources and the economic foundations of Buddhist monasteries declined, on which the survival and growth of Buddhism was based. The arrival of Islam removed the royal patronage to the monastic tradition of Buddhism, and the replacement of Buddhists in long-distance trade by the Muslims eroded the related sources of patronage.

In the Gangetic plains, Odisha, northeast and the southern regions of India, Buddhism survived through the early centuries of the 2nd millennium. The Islamic invasion plundered wealth and destroyed Buddhist images, and consequent take over of land holdings of Buddhist monasteries removed one source of necessary support for the Buddhists, while the economic upheaval and new taxes on laity sapped the laity support of Buddhist monks.

Monasteries and institutions such as Nalanda were abandoned by Buddhist monks or destroyed from the 8th through 15th centuries, who were forced to flee to escape the invading Muslim army, after which the site decayed over the Islamic rule in India that followed.

The last empire to support Buddhism, the Pala dynasty, fell in the 12th century, and Muhammad bin Bakhtiyar Khalji, a general of the early Delhi Sultanate, destroyed monasteries and monuments and spread Islam in Bengal. According to Randall Collins, Buddhism was already declining in India before the 12th century, but with the pillage by Muslim invaders it nearly became extinct in India in the 1200s. In the 13th century, states Craig Lockard, Buddhist monks in India escaped to Tibet to escape Islamic persecution; while the monks in western India, states Peter Harvey, escaped persecution by moving to south Indian Hindu kingdoms that were able to resist the Muslim power.

=== Surviving Buddhists ===
Recent evidence has uncovered the existence of many late Indian Buddhist travellers and scholars who were active into the 15th and 16th centuries. The last abbot of the Bodh Gaya mahavihara in Bihar was Śāriputra who was active into the 1400s when he left India to travel in Tibet and China. Dhyānabhadra was another figure who was previously a student at Nalanda and left India in the early 1300s to travel to China and Korea. Other names of later Indian Buddhist figures include Vanaratna and Buddhaguptanātha. Many Indian Buddhists fled south. It is known that Buddhists continued to exist in India even after the 14th century from texts such as the Chaitanya Charitamrita. This text outlines an episode in the life of Chaitanya Mahaprabhu (1486–1533), a Vaishnava saint, who was said to have entered into a debate with Buddhists in Tamil Nadu.

The Tibetan Taranatha (1575–1634) wrote a history of Indian Buddhism, which mentions Buddhism as having survived in some pockets of India during his time. He mentions the Buddhist sangha as having survived in Konkana, Kalinga, Mewad, Chittor, Abu, Saurastra, Vindhya mountains, Ratnagiri, Karnataka etc. The Jain author Gunakirti (1450-1470) wrote a Marathi text, Dhamramrita, where he gives the names of 16 Buddhist orders. Vidyadhar Johrapurkar noted that among them, the names Sataghare, Dongare, Navaghare, Kavishvar, Vasanik and Ichchhabhojanik still survive in Maharashtra as family names. The mahavihara at Ratnagiri, Odisha seems to have continued with a reduced community, and some renovation of buildings, until the 16th century, perhaps funded by foreign pilgrims as it is near the coast accessible from South-East Asia.

Buddhism also survived to the modern era in Himalayan regions such as Ladakh, with close ties to Tibet. A unique tradition survives in Nepal's Newar Buddhism. The most important Buddhist pilgrimage sites in India, in particular Bodh Gaya, continued to receive pilgrims from outside India throughout the medieval and modern periods, which are now greatly increased with easier air travel.

In Bihar and Bengal, many Buddhist shrines and temples have remained intact with the Buddha or Bodhisattva inside, being appropriated and worshipped as a Brahmanical deity. Around the neighbourhood of Nalanda, the remains of votive stupas are worshipped as Shiva lingas. An image of the Buddha in bhūmisparśa mudrā at the village of Telhara receives full-fledged pūjā as Hanuman during Rama Navami. A sculpture of the Buddha has ended up as Vāsudeva at Gunaighar in Comilla.

Abul Fazl, the courtier of the Mughal emperor Akbar, states, "For a long time past scarce any trace of them (the Buddhists) has existed in Hindustan." When he visited Kashmir in 1597, he met with a few old men professing Buddhism, however he 'saw none among the learned'. This is can also be seen from the fact that Buddhist priests were not present amidst learned divines that came to the Ibadat Khana of Akbar at Fatehpur Sikri.

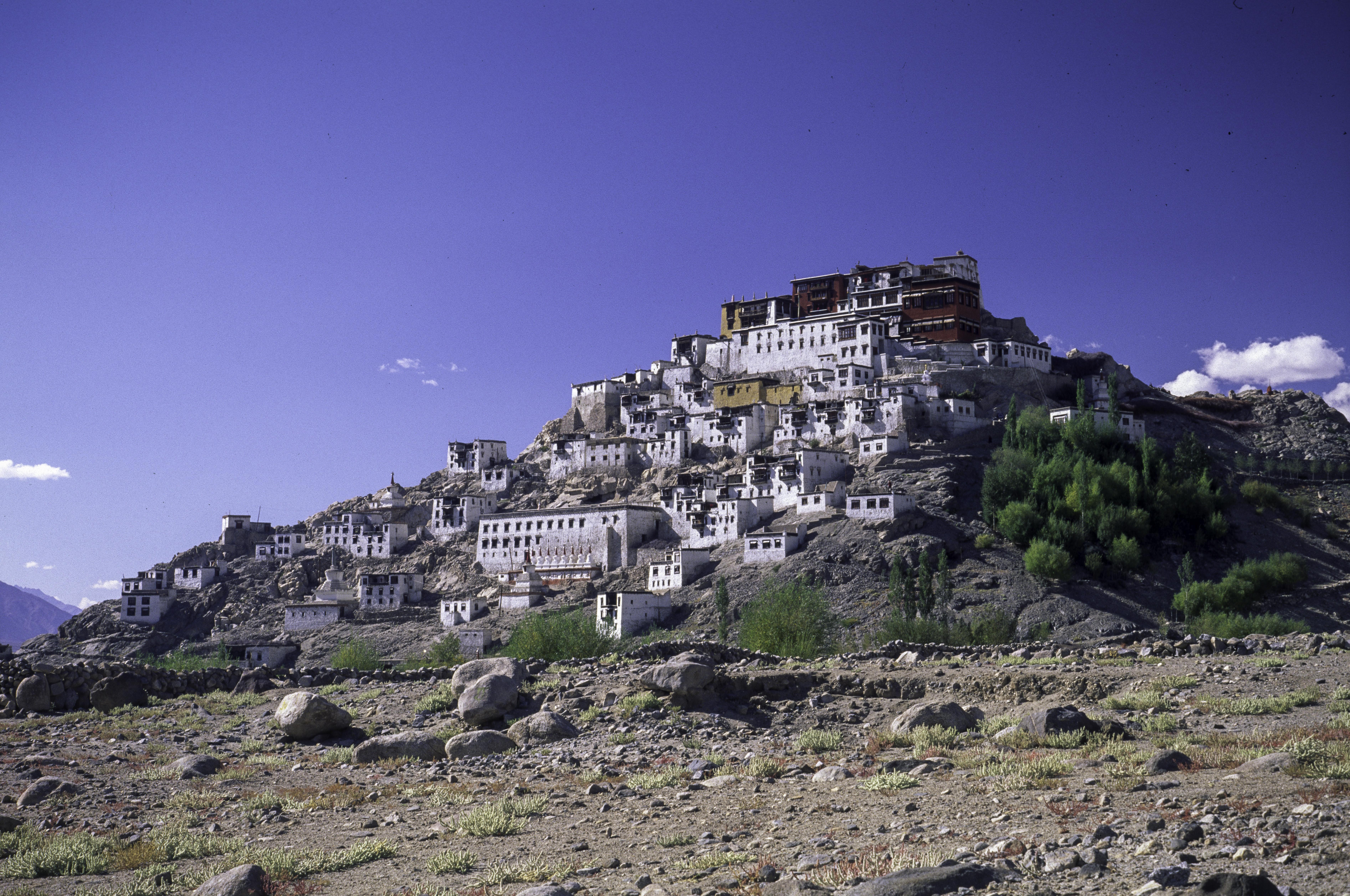
Thikse Monastery is the largest gompa in Ladakh, built in the 1500s.

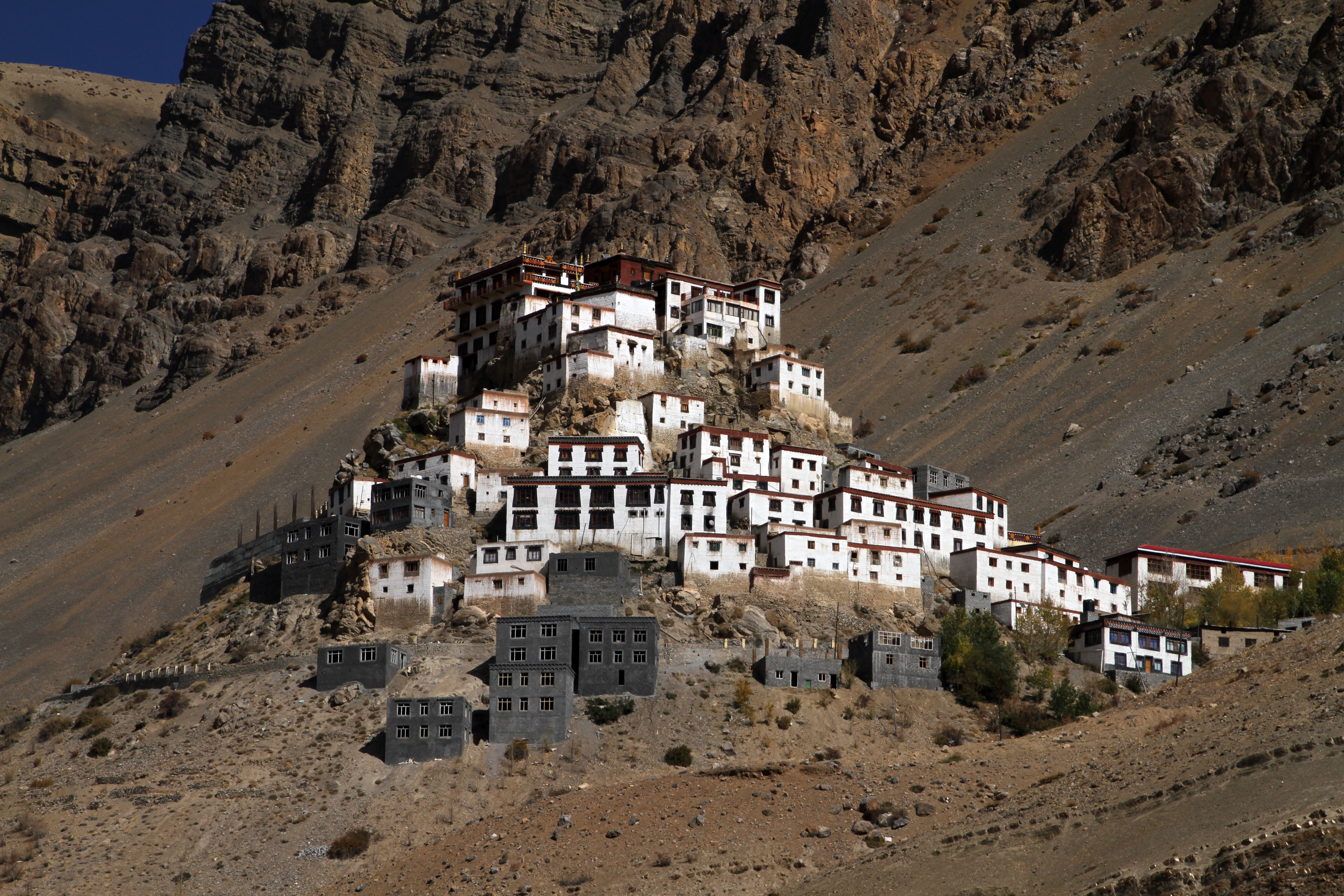
Key Gompa in the Spiti Valley of Himachal Pradesh.

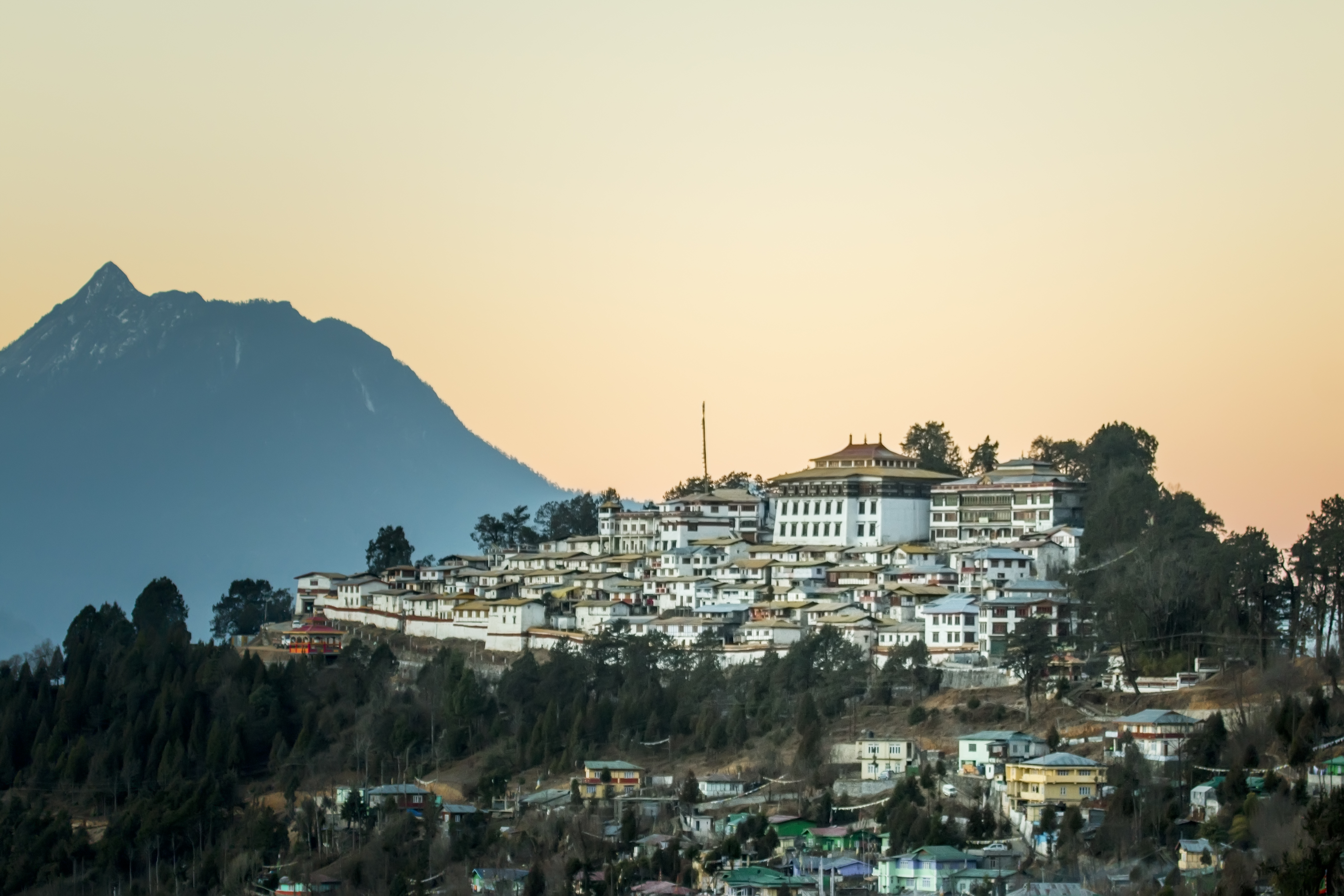
Tawang Monastery in Arunachal Pradesh, was built in the 1600s, is the largest monastery in India and second largest in the world after the Potala Palace in Lhasa, Tibet.

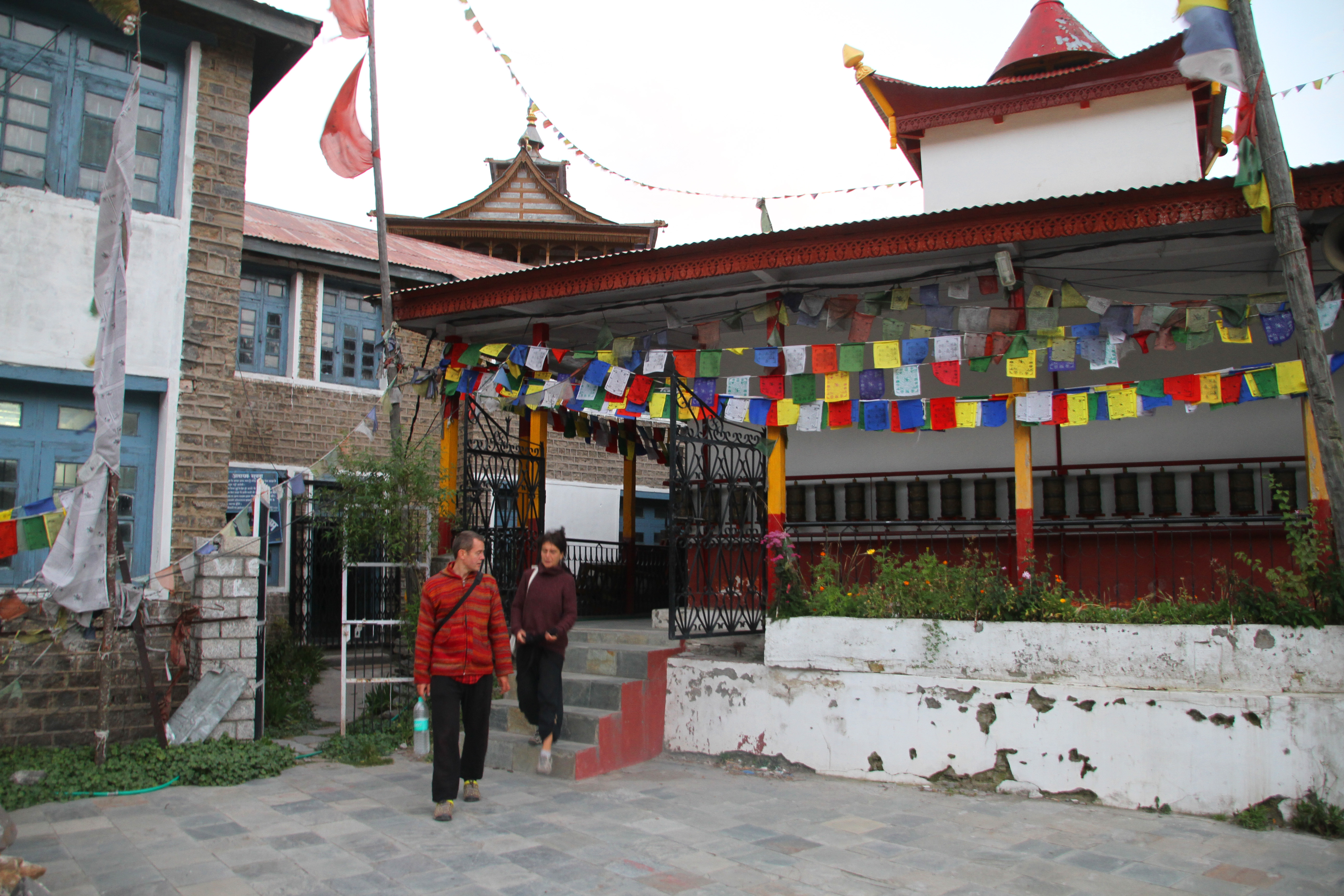
A temple in Kalpa, Kinnaur. The local Kinnauri follow a syncretism of Hinduism and Buddhism.

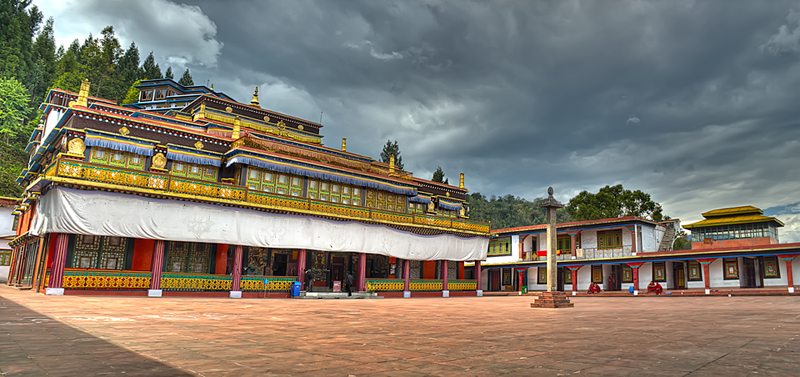
Rumtek Monastery in Sikkim was built under the direction of Changchub Dorje, 12th Karmapa Lama in the mid-1700s.

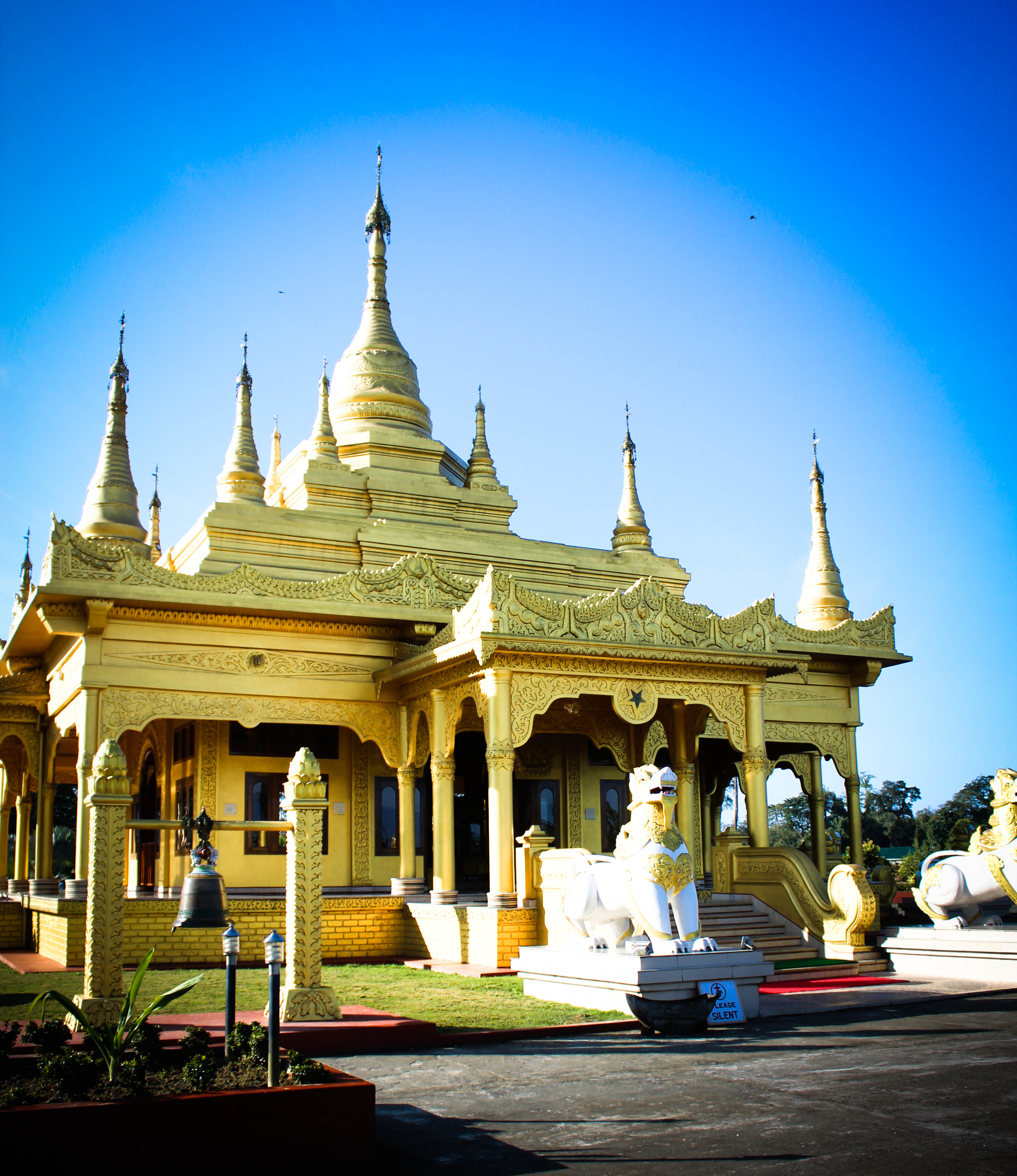
The Golden Pagoda of Namsai is a temple of the Buddhist Khamti people in Namsai District of Arunachal Pradesh.

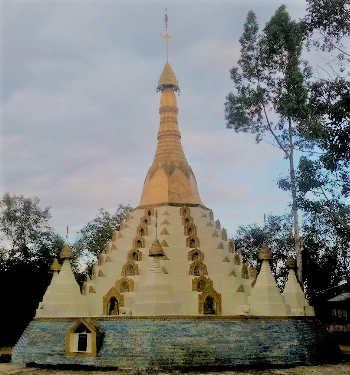
A stupa in Kamalanagar, Mizoram. The local Chakmas are Mahayana Buddhists.

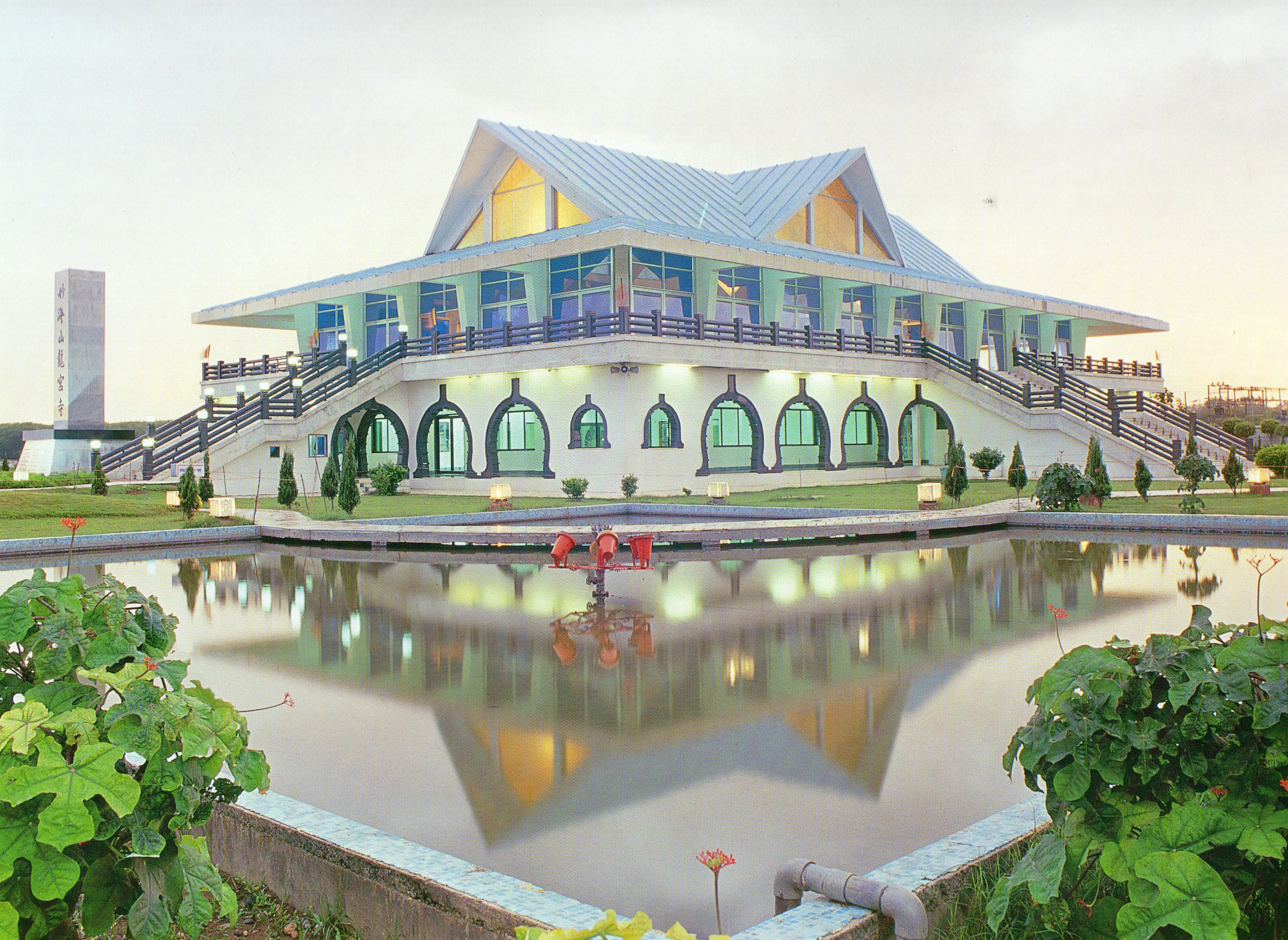
The Lotus Temple of Nagpur. Nagpur Division is home to more than a million Buddhist Dalits.

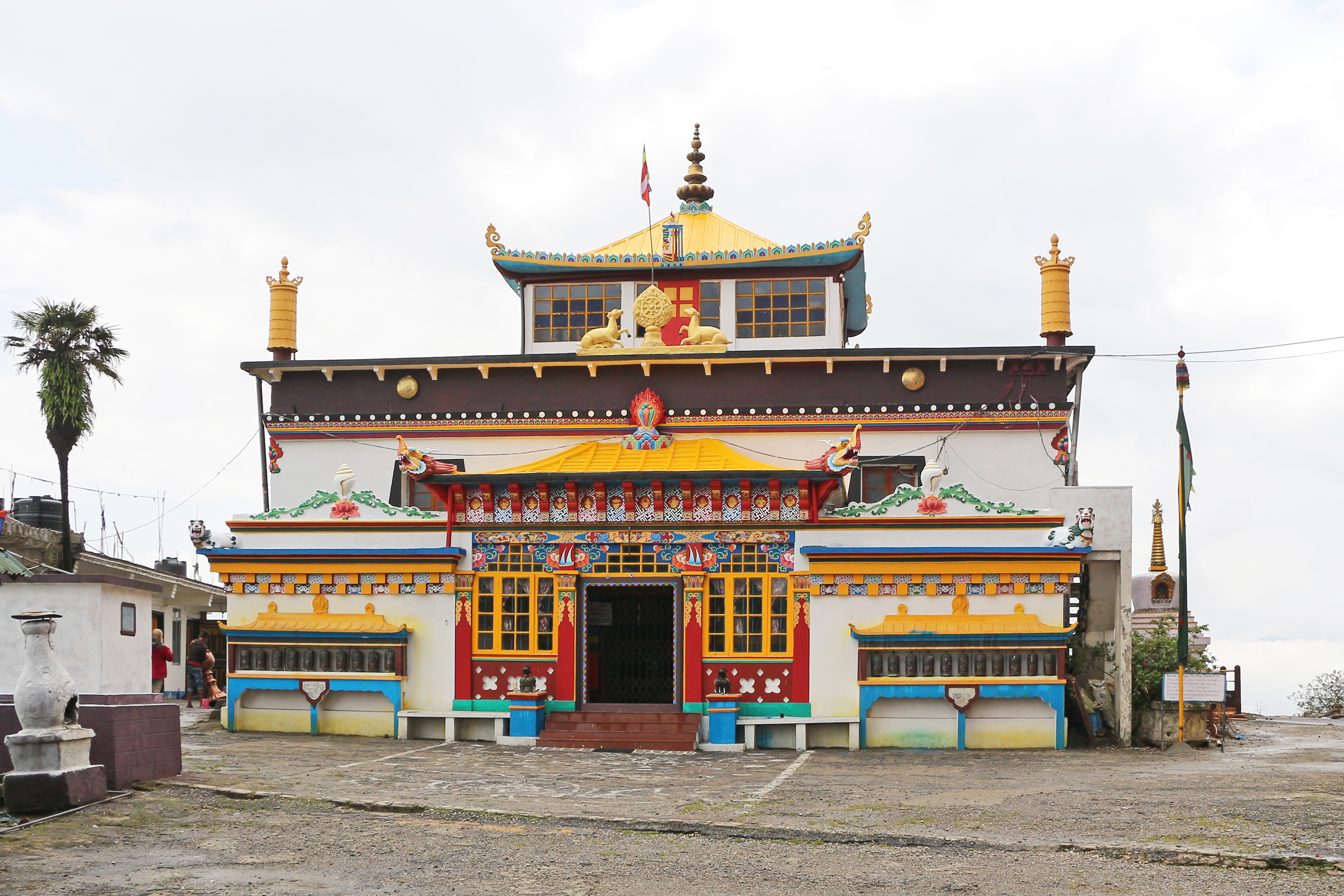
The Yiga Choeling Monastery in Ghum, West Bengal.

=== Causes within the Buddhist tradition of the time ===
Some scholars suggest that a part of the decline of Buddhist monasteries was because it was detached from everyday life in India and did not participate in the ritual social aspects such as the rites of passage (marriage, funeral, birth of child) like other religions.

== Revival ==
=== Maha Bodhi Society ===
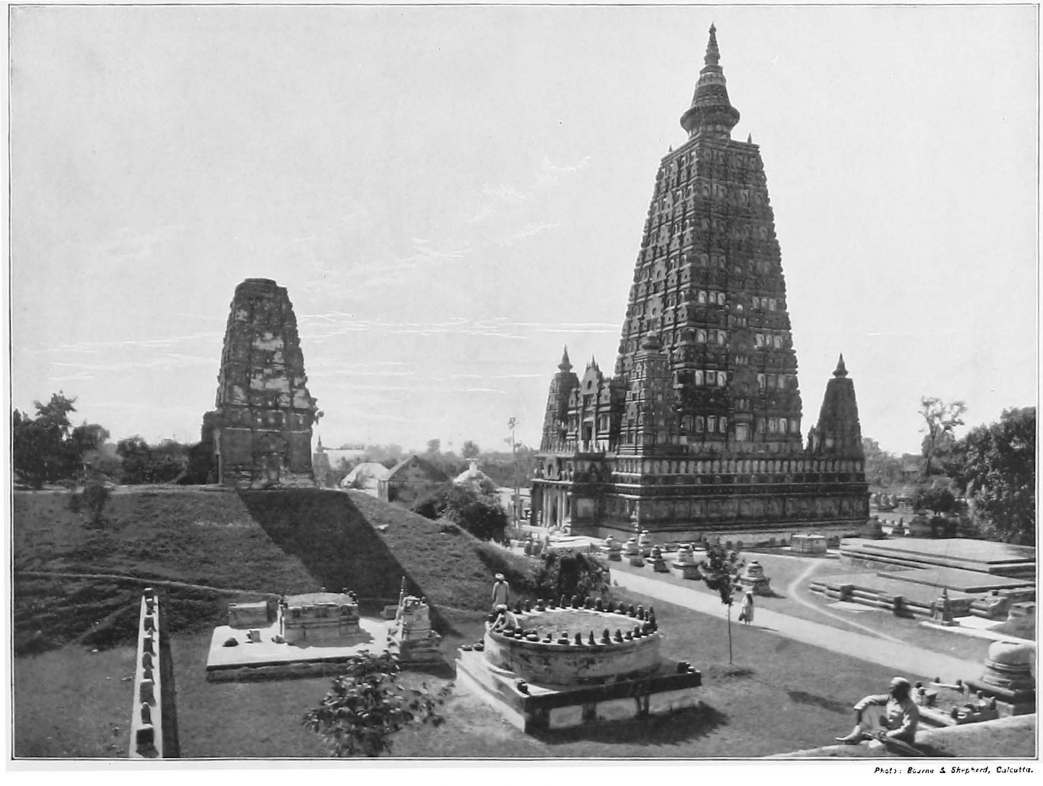
The Mahabodhi temple as it appeared in 1899, shortly after its restoration in the 1880s

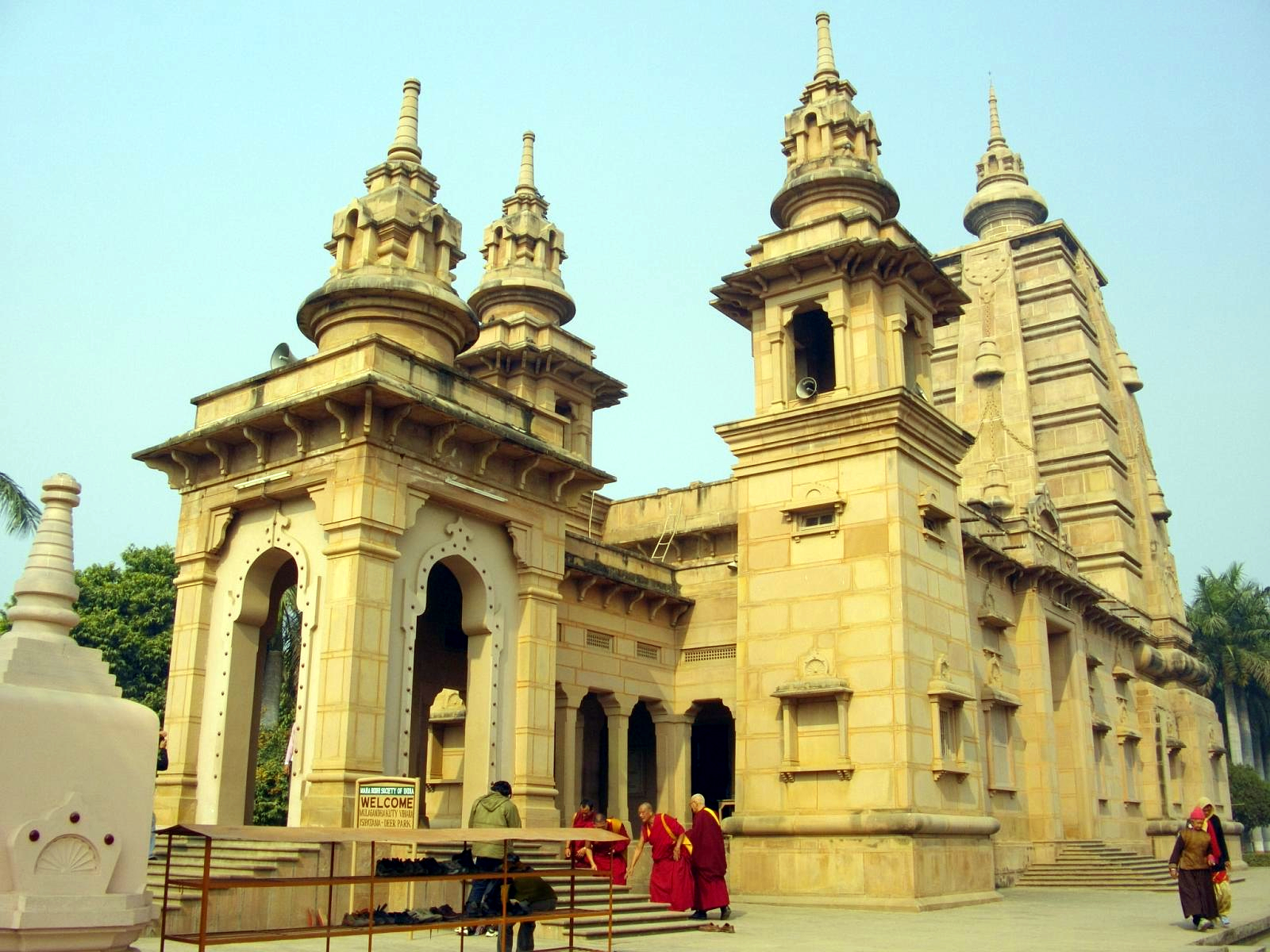
Maha-Bodhi Mulagandhakuti Buddhist Temple at Sarnath

The modern revival of Buddhism in India began in the late nineteenth century, led by Buddhist modernist institutions such as the Maha Bodhi Society (1891), the Bengal Buddhist Association (1892) and the Young Men's Buddhist Association (1898). These institutions were influenced by modernist South Asian Buddhist currents such as Sri Lankan Buddhist modernism as well as Western Oriental scholarship and spiritual movements like Theosophy.

A central figure of this movement was Sri Lankan Buddhist leader Anagarika Dharmapala, who founded the Maha Bodhi Society in 1891. An important focus of the Maha Bodhi Society's activities in India became the recovery, conservation and restoration of important Buddhist sites, such as Bodh Gaya and its Mahabodhi temple. Dharmapāla and the society promoted the building of Buddhist vihāras and temples in India, including the one at Sarnath, the place of Buddha's first sermon. Dharmapāla died in 1933, the same year he was ordained a bhikkhu. There's another independent organization by the same name of Maha Bodhi Society that was founded by Acharya Buddharakkhita in Bengaluru in 1956. It is affiliated with Anagarika Dharmapala's Maha Bodhi Society of Kolkata.

Following Indian independence, India's ancient Buddhist heritage became an important element for nation-building, and prime minister Jawaharlal Nehru looked to the Mauryan empire for symbols of pan-Indian unity which were neither Hindu nor Muslim, such as the Dhammachakra. Indian Buddhist sites also received Indian government support in preparation for the 2,500th Buddha Jayanti held in 1956, as well as providing rent-free land in several pilgrimage centres for Asian Buddhist groups to build temples and rest houses.

Important Indian Buddhist intellectuals of the modern period include Rahul Sankrityayan (1893-1963), Dharmanand Kosambi (1876-1941) and Bhadant Anand Kausalyayan. The Bengal Buddhist Kripasaran Mahasthavir (1865-1926) founded the Bengal Buddhist Association in 1892. In Tamil Nadu, the Tamil Iyothee Thass (1845-1914) was a major figure who promoted Buddhism and called the Paraiyars to convert.

The Indian government and the states have continued to promote the development of Buddhist pilgrimage sites ("the Buddhist Circuit"), both as a source of tourism and as a promotion of India's Buddhist heritage which is an important cultural resource for India's foreign diplomatic ties. In 2010, the Nalanda University was established in Bihar.

=== Dalit Buddhist movement ===
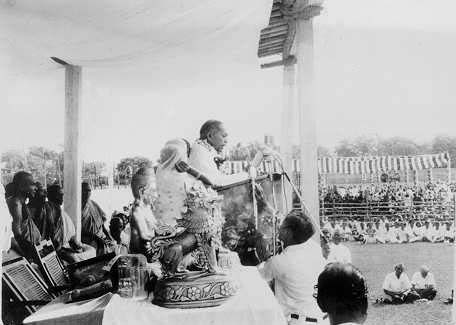
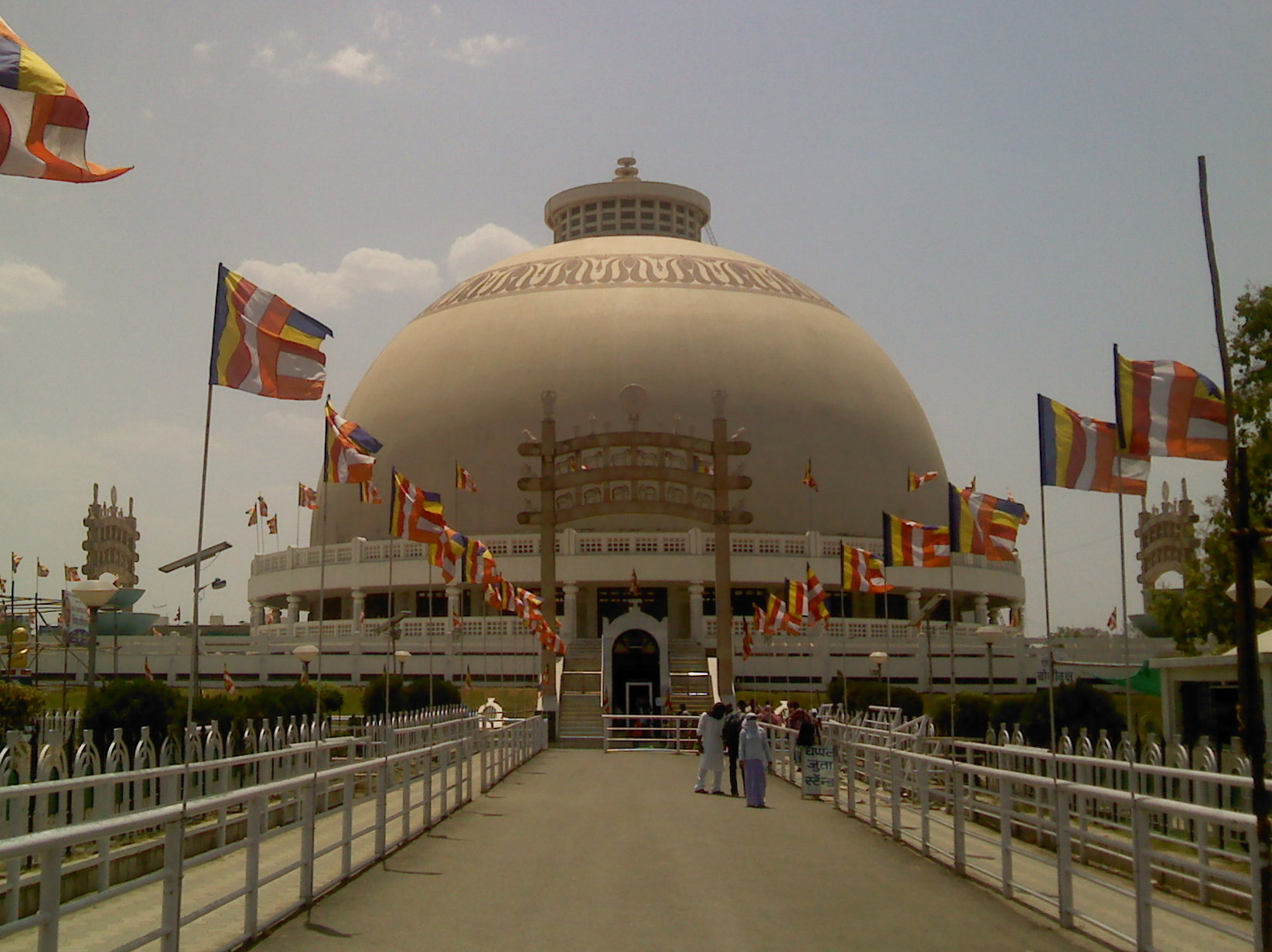
(left) B. R. Ambedkar delivering a speech during conversion, Nagpur, 14 October 1956; (right) Deekshabhoomi monument, located in Nagpur, Maharashtra where B. R. Ambedkar converted to Buddhism in 1956 is the largest stupa in Asia.

In the 1950s, the Dalit political leader B. R. Ambedkar (1891-1956) influenced by his reading of Pali sources and Indian Buddhists like Dharmanand Kosambi and Lakshmi Narasu, began promoting conversion to Buddhism for Indian low caste Dalits. His Dalit Buddhist Movement was most successful in the Indian states of Maharashtra, which saw large scale conversions. Ambedkar's "Neo Buddhism" included a strong element of social and political protest against Hinduism and the Indian caste system. His magnum opus, The Buddha and His Dhamma, incorporated Marxist ideas of class struggle into Buddhist views of dukkha and argued that Buddhist morality could be used to "reconstruct society and to build up a modern, progressive society of justice, equality, and freedom".

The conversion movement has generally been limited to certain social demographics, such as the Mahar caste of Maharashtra and the Jatavs. Although they have renounced Hinduism in practice, a community survey showed adherence to many practices of the old faith including endogamy, worshipping the traditional family deity etc.

Major organizations of this movement are the Buddhist Society of India (the Bharatiya Bauddha Mahasabha) and the Triratna Buddhist Community (the Triratna Bauddha Mahasangha).

=== Tibetan Buddhism ===
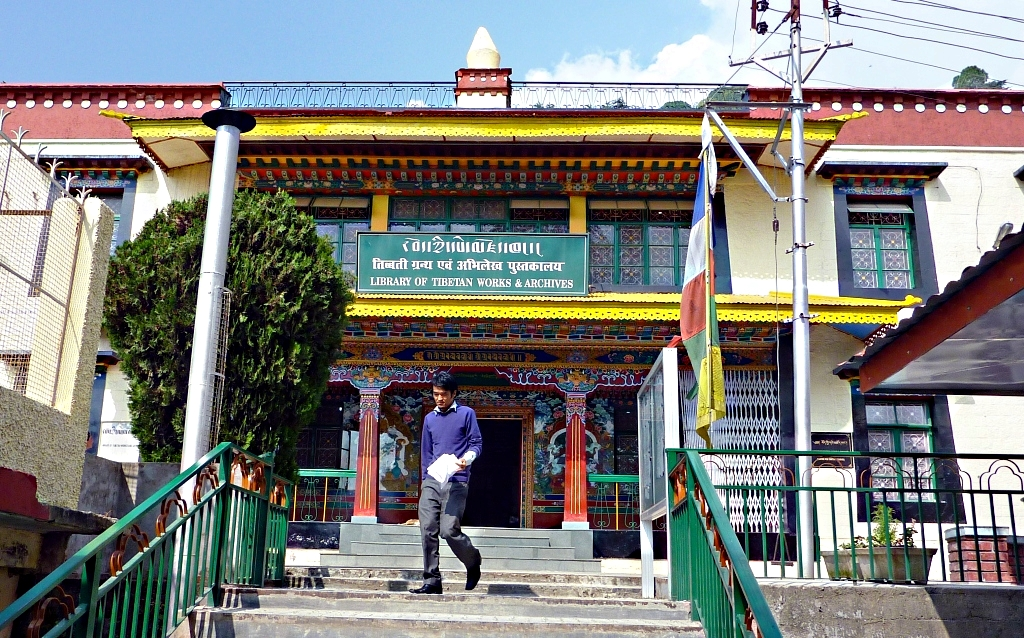
Tibetan Library, Dharamsala

Tibetan Buddhism has also grown in India during the modern era, mainly due to the growth of the Tibetan diaspora. The arrival of the 14th Dalai Lama with over 85,000 Tibetan refugees in 1959 had a significant impact on the revival of Buddhism in India. Large numbers of Tibetans settled in Dharamsala, Himachal Pradesh, which became the headquarters of the Tibetan Government in Exile. Another large Tibetan refugee settlement is in Bylakuppe, Karnataka. Tibetan refugees also contributed to the revitalization of the Buddhist traditions in Himalayan regions such as Lahaul and Spiti district, Ladakh, Tawang and Bomdila. Tibetan Buddhists have also contributed to the building of temples and institutions in the Buddhist sites and ruins of India.

The Dalai Lama's brother, Gyalo Thondup, himself lives in Kalimpong and his wife established the Tibetan Refugee Centre in Darjeeling. The 17th Karmapa also arrived in India in 2000 and continues education and has taken traditional role to head Karma Kagyu sect of Tibetan Buddhism and every year leads the Kagyu Monlam in Bodh Gaya attended by thousands of monks and followers. Palpung Sherabling monastery seat of the 12th Tai Situpa located in Kangra, Himachal Pradesh is the largest Kagyu monastery in India and has become an important centre of Tibetan Buddhism. Penor Rinpoche, the head of Nyingma, the ancient school of Tibetan Buddhism re-established a Nyingma monastery in Bylakuppe, Mysore. This is the largest Nyingma monastery today. Monks from Himalayan regions of India, Nepal, Bhutan and from Tibet join this monastery for their higher education. Penor Rinpoche also founded Thubten Lekshey Ling, a dharma center for lay practitioners in Bangalore. Vajrayana Buddhism and Dzogchen (maha-sandhi) meditation again became accessible to aspirants in India after that.

=== Vipassana movement ===
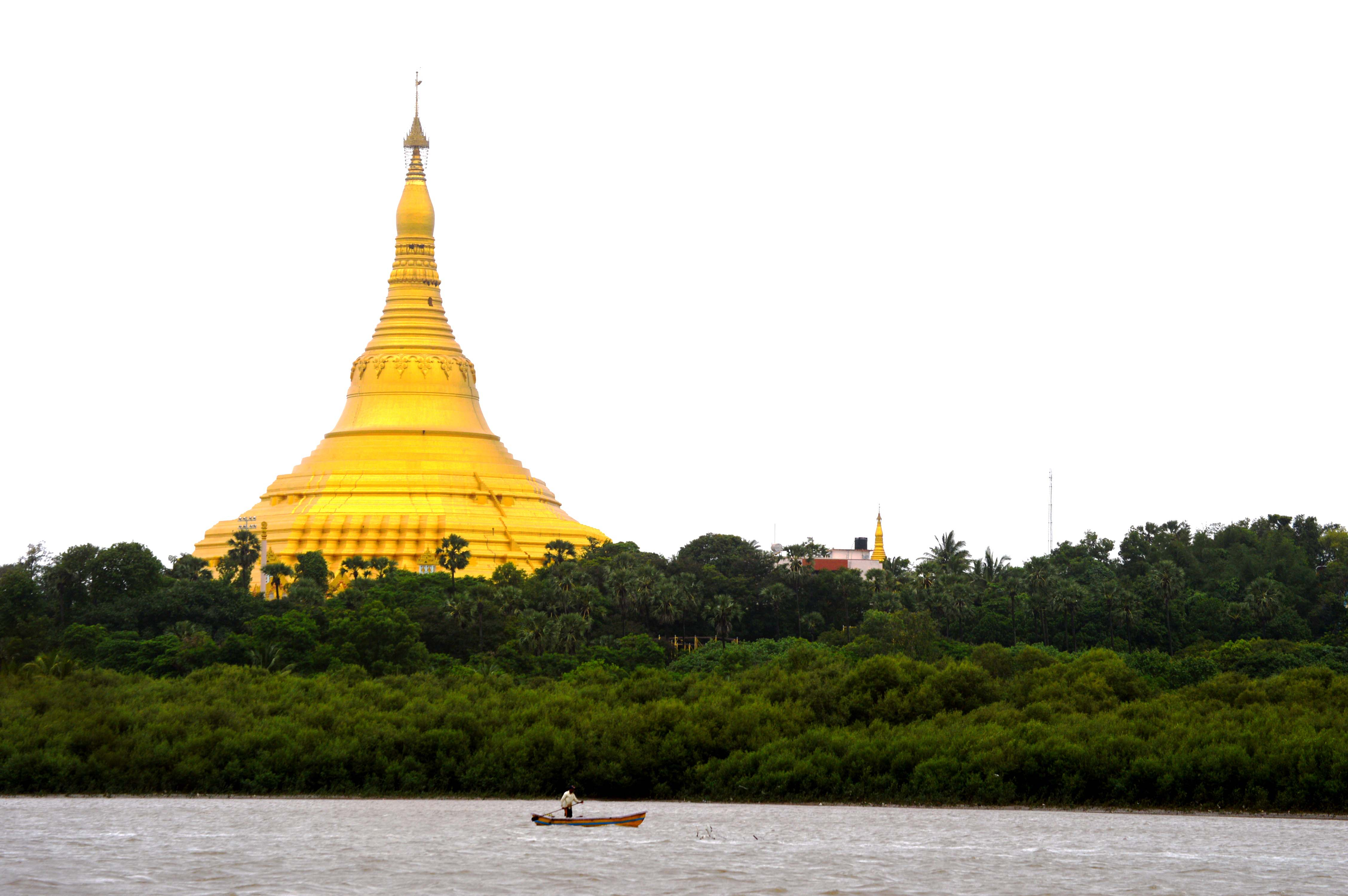
Global Vipassana Pagoda

The Vipassana movement is a modern tradition of Buddhist meditation practice. In India, the most influential Vipassana organization is the Vipassana Research Institute founded by S.N. Goenka (1924-2013) who promoted Buddhist Vipassana meditation in a modern and non-sectarian manner. Goenka's network of meditation centers who offered 10 day retreats. Many institutions—both government and private sector—now offer courses for their employees. This form is mainly practiced by elite and middle class Indians. This movement has spread to many other countries in Europe, America and Asia. In November 2008, the construction of the Global Vipassana Pagoda was completed on the outskirts of Mumbai.

== Culture ==
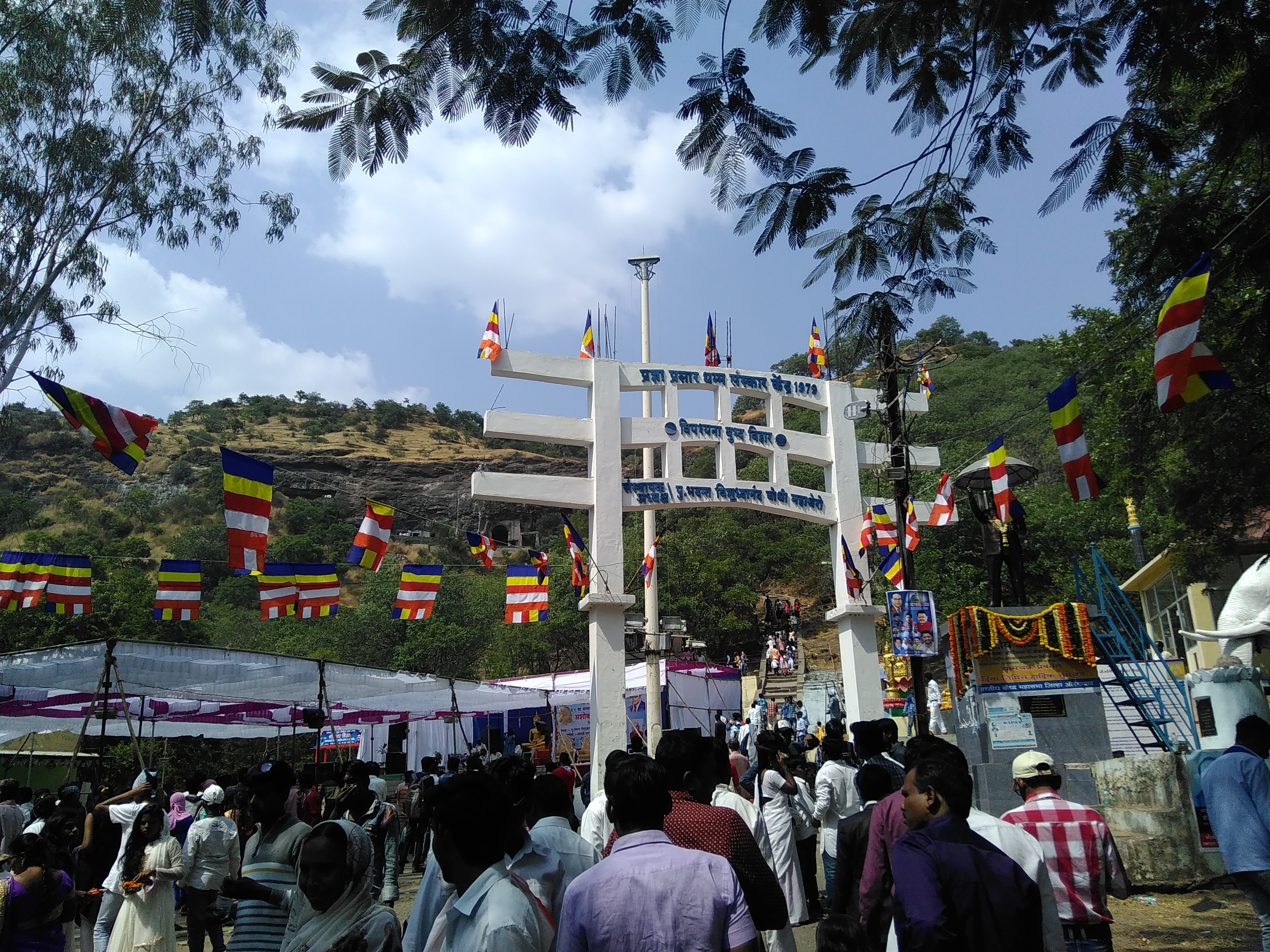
Marathi Buddhists celebrating the 62nd Dhammachakra Pravartan Din at the Aurangabad Caves area in Aurangabad, Maharashtra on 18 October 2018

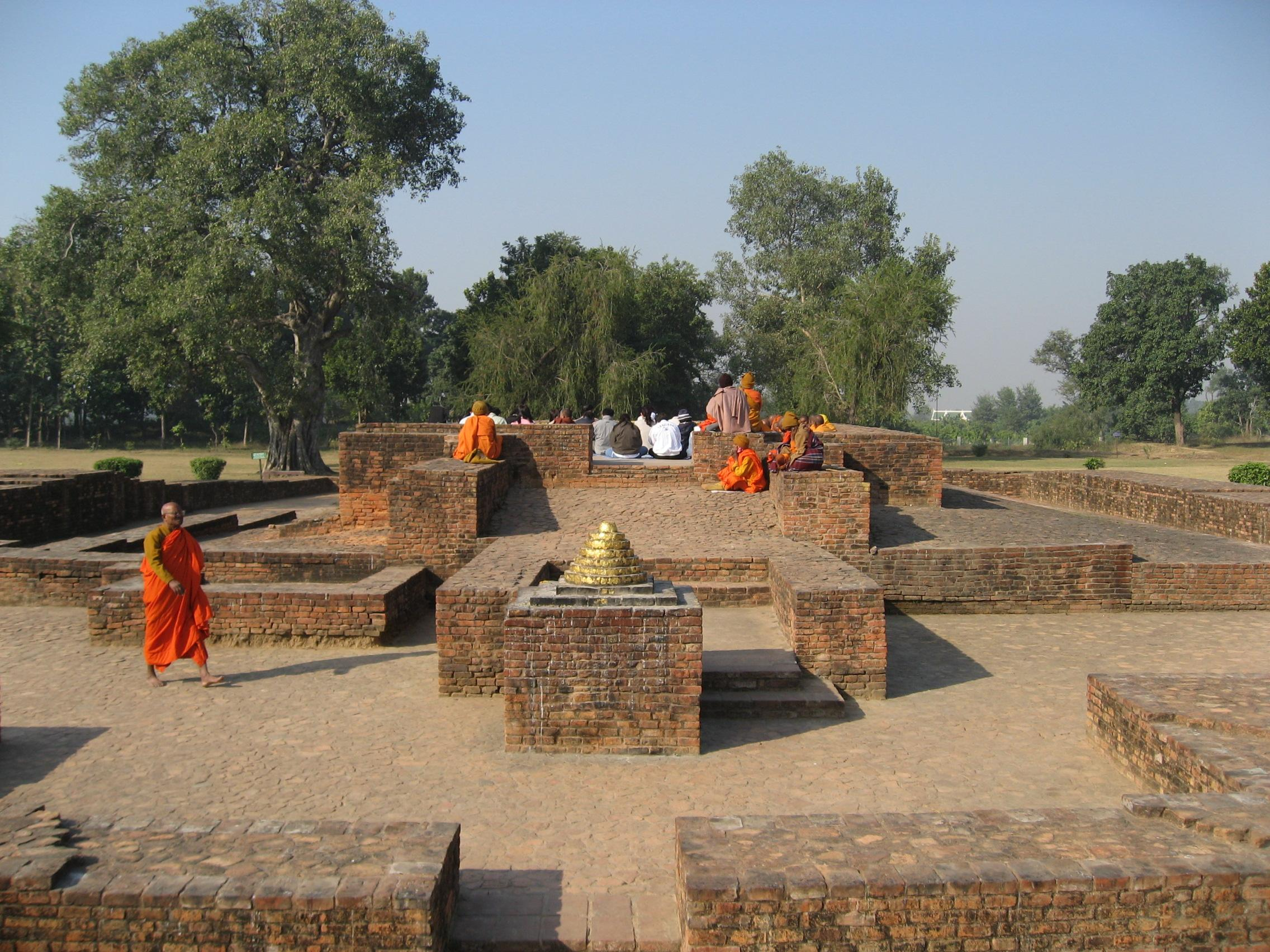
Buddhist monks meditating in Jetavana.

=== Communities ===
- Marathi Buddhists (including Mahar) constitute the most populous Buddhist community in India. Various indigenous ethnic Buddhist communities such as the Sherpas, Bhutias, Lepchas, Tamangs, Yolmos, and ethnic Tibetans can be found in the Darjeeling Himalayan hill region.
- Beda people: The Beda people are a Buddhist community of the Indian union territory of Ladakh, where they practise their traditional occupation of musicianship.
- Bengali Buddhists: Bengali Buddhist people mainly live in Bangladesh (500,000), and the Indian states West Bengal (282,898) and Tripura (125,182). Bengali Buddhists are followers of Theravada Buddhism.
- Bhotiya
- Bhutia
- Bodh people
- Bugun
- Chakma people
- Chugpa tribe
- Gurung people
- Khamba people
- Khamti people
- Khamyang people
- Lepcha people
- Lishipa tribe
- Na people
- Rakhine people
- Sherpa people
- Tai Phake people
- Tamang people

=== Festivals ===
Indian Buddhists celebrate many festivals. Ambedkar Jayanti, Dhammachakra Pravartan Day and Buddha's Birthday are three major festivals of Navayana Buddhism. Traditional Buddhists celebrate Losar, Buddha Purnima and other festivals.

- Ambedkar Jayanti (B. R. Ambedkar's birthday): Ambedkar Jayanti is a major festival in India, celebrated in the memory of B.R. Ambedkar, a champion of class rights in India.. The annual festival is observed on 14 April to commemorate the memory of B. R. Ambedkar. Ambedkar was a champion of class rights in India, He is also credited as being the "Father of the Indian Constitution". Ambedkar Jayanti is celebrated in India as well as other countries. Ambedkar Jayanti processions are undertaken by his Buddhist followers at Chaitya Bhoomi in Mumbai and Deeksha Bhoomi in Nagpur. Large numbers of Indian Buddhists visit viharas, and local statues commemorating Ambedkar are carried in procession with a lot of fanfare.

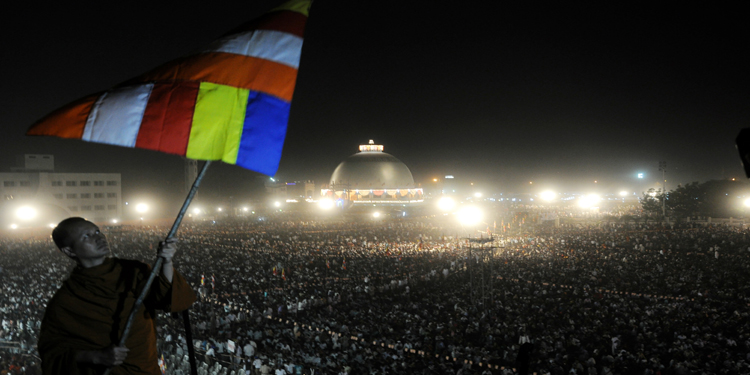
Dhammachakra Pravartan Day celebrations

- Dhammachakra Pravartan Din is celebrated to mark the conversion to Buddhism of Ambedkar and approximately 600,000 followers on 14 October 1956 at Deekshabhoomi. Every year on Ashoka Vijayadashami, millions of Buddhists gather at Deekshabhoomi to celebrate the mass conversion. Many Buddhists also visit local Buddhist sites there to celebrate the festival. Every year on that day thousands of people embrace Buddhism.
- Buddha Purnima Is celebrated by both Buddhists and non-Buddhists in India. It is believed to be a festival celebrating the adoption of the teachings of Siddharata Gautama. On this day Indian Buddhists wear white clothes and meditate, and are supposed to only consume vegetarian food. Mahabodhi Temple is a popular attraction during this time period.

== Branches ==
Buddhism in India (2011 National Census)
1. Navayana Buddhists (87.0%)
2. Traditional Buddhists (Mahayana, Theravada, Vajrayana and others) (13.0%)

According to an IndiaSpend analysis of 2011 Census data, there are more than 8.4 million Buddhists in India of whom 87% are neo-Buddhists or Navayana Buddhists. They are converted from other religions, mostly Dalits (Scheduled Caste) who changed religion to escape the Caste system of Hinduism. The remaining 13% belong to traditional Buddhist communities (Theravada, Mahayana, Vajrayana and others) of the northeast and northern Himalayan regions.

== Demographics ==
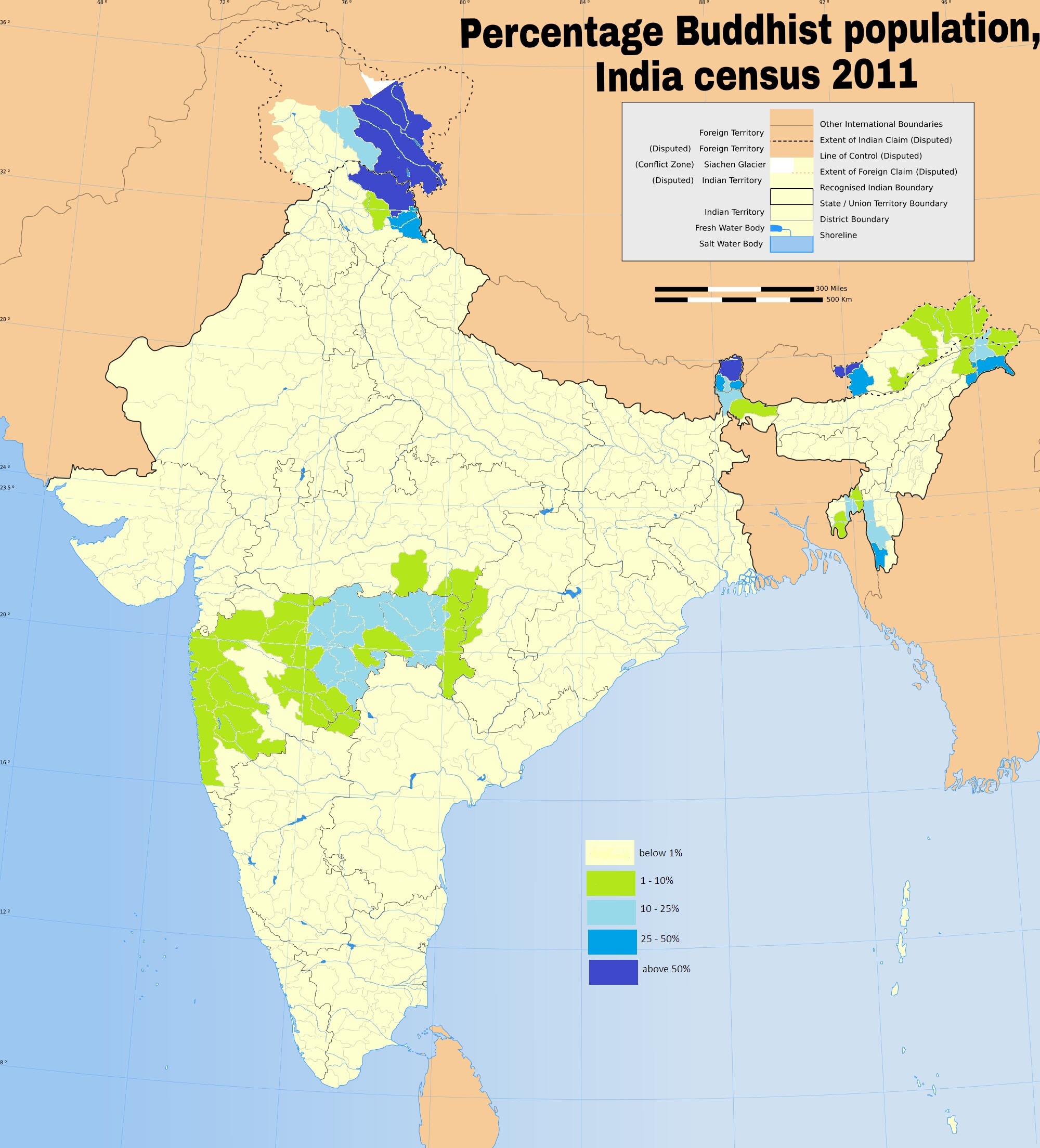
District wise percentage of the Buddhist population according to the 2011 census

Year	Percent	Increase
1951	0.05%	—N/a
1961	0.74%	+0.69%
1971	0.70%	-0.04%
1981	0.71%	+0.01%
1991	0.76%	+0.05%
2001	0.77%	+0.01%
2011	0.70%	-0.07%

The Buddhist percentage has decreased from 0.74% in 1961 to 0.70% in 2011. Between 2001 and 2011, the Buddhist population declined in Uttar Pradesh, Karnataka, Delhi, and Punjab.

According to the 2011 census there are 8.4 million Buddhists in India. Maharashtra has the highest number of Buddhists in India, with 5.81% of the total population. Almost 90 per cent of Navayana or Neo-Buddhists live in this state. Marathi Buddhists, who live in Maharashtra, are the largest Buddhist community in India. Most Buddhist Marathi people belong to the former Mahar community.

Buddhist population growth
Year	Pop.	±%
1951	180,823	—
1961	3,250,227	+1697.5%
1971	3,812,325	+17.3%
1981	4,720,000	+23.8%
1991	6,388,000	+35.3%
2001	7,955,207	+24.5%
2011	8,442,972	+6.1%
Source: Census of India

In the 1951 census of India, 180,823 (0.05%) respondents said they were Buddhist. The 1961 census, taken after B. R. Ambedkar adopted Navayana Buddhism with his millions of followers in 1956, showed an increase to 3.25 million (0.74%). Buddhism is growing rapidly in the Scheduled Caste (dalit) community. According to the 2011 census, Scheduled Castes Buddhists grew by 38 percent in the country. According to the 2011 census, 5.76 million (69%) Indian Buddhists belong to the Scheduled Caste.

The majority (92%) of the people in the Chakma Autonomous region in Mizoram follows Theravada Buddhism.

=== Census of India, 2011 ===
States and union territories having more than 100,000 Buddhists in 2011 India Census
State and union territory	Buddhist Population (approximate)	Buddhist Population (%)	% of total Buddhists
Maharashtra	6,531,200	5.81%	77.36%
West Bengal	282,898	0.31%	3.35%
Madhya Pradesh	216,052	0.30%	2.56%
Uttar Pradesh	206,285	0.10%	2.44%
Sikkim	167,216	27.39%	1.98%
Arunachal Pradesh	162,815	11.77%	1.93%
Tripura	125,385	3.41%	1.49%
Jammu and Kashmir _{(before 2019 formation of Ladakh)}	112,584	0.90%	1.33%
Ladakh _{(formed 2019)}	108,761	39.65%	1.29%

District with higher percentage of Buddhism (above 20%) in India.

District	State	Percentage
Tawang District	Arunachal Pradesh	69.87%
Leh District	Ladakh	66.40%
Lahaul and Spiti district	Himachal Pradesh	62.01%
Mangan district	Sikkim	53.35%
Lawngtlai district	Mizoram	43.72%
West Kameng District	Arunachal Pradesh	42.99%
Changlang District	Arunachal Pradesh	36.30%
Soreng district	Sikkim	27.42%
Pakyong district	Sikkim	26.50%
Gyalshing district	Sikkim	25.99%
Namchi district	Sikkim	23.87%
Namsai District	Arunachal Pradesh	22.05%
Gangtok district	Sikkim	22.55%
Kinnaur District	Himachal Pradesh	21.50%
Kalimpong District	West Bengal	20.94%
Lunglei District	Mizoram	20.70%

== Notable figures ==
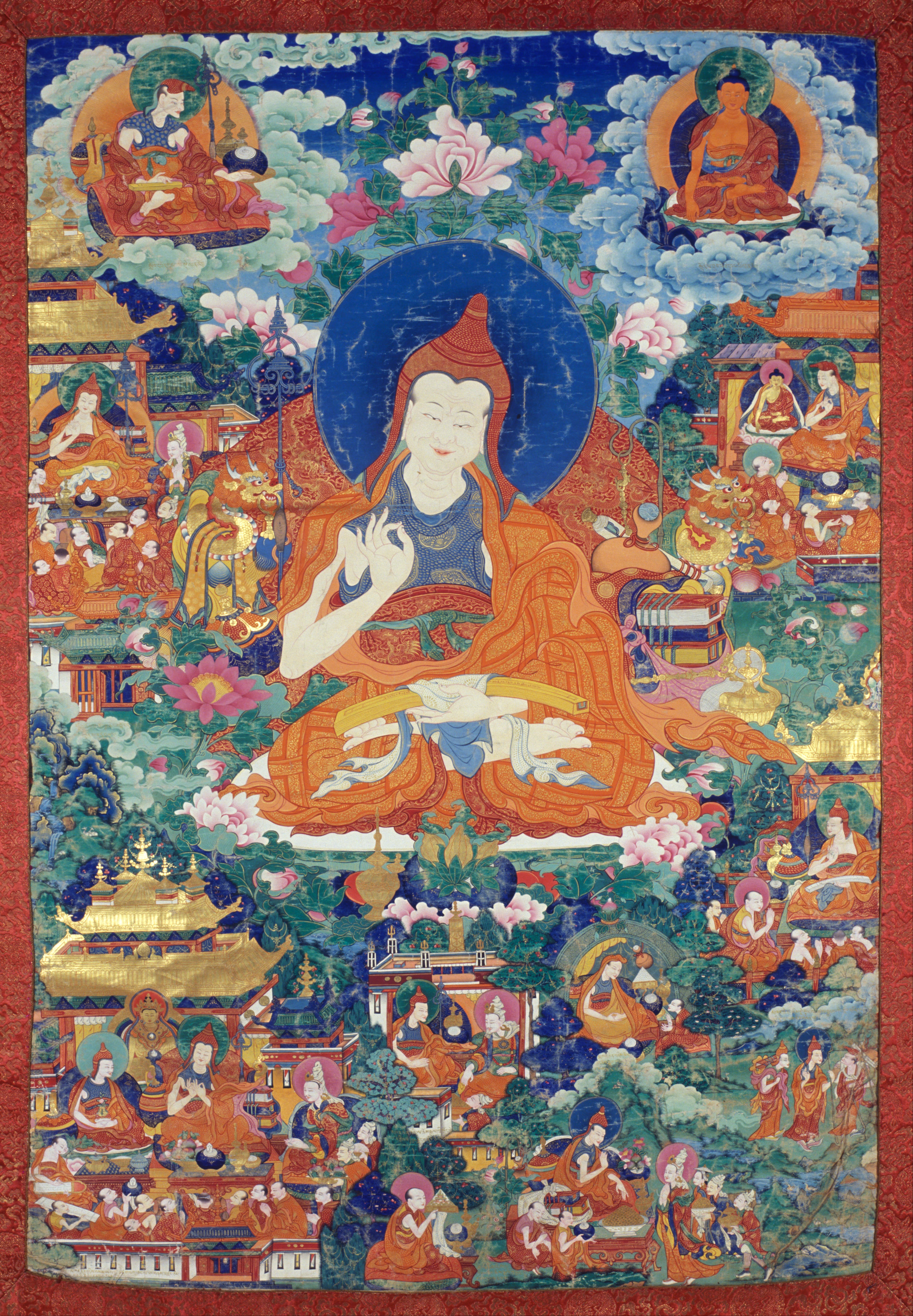
Śāntarakṣita, Abbot of Nalanda in the 8th century, who played an important role in the spread of Buddhism in Tibet.

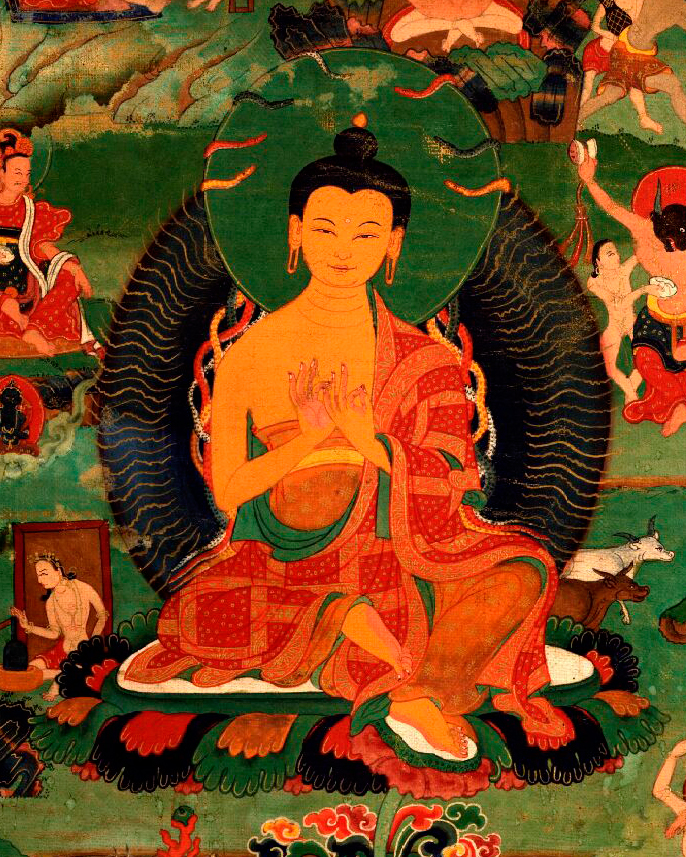
Nagarjuna, active in the 2nd century and established the Madhyamaka school of Mahayana Buddhism

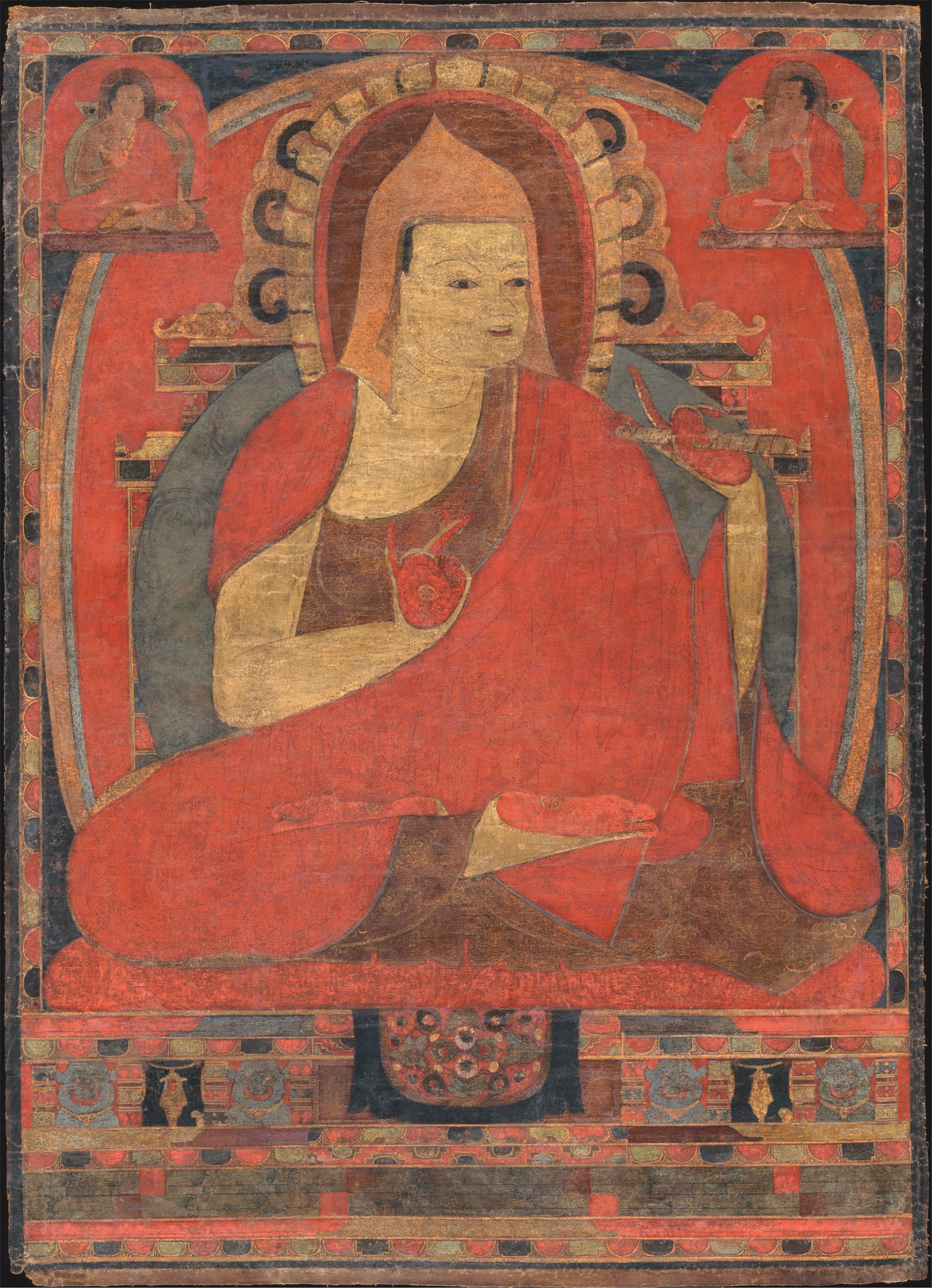
Atiśa, who lived during the 11th century, a major figures in the spread of Mahayana and Vajrayana Buddhism in Asia, inspiring Buddhist thought from Tibet to Sumatra.

In the Edicts of Ashoka, Ashoka mentions the Hellenistic kings of the period as a recipient of his Buddhist proselytism. The Mahavamsa describes emissaries of Ashoka, such as Dharmaraksita, as leading Greek ("Yona") Buddhist monks, active in Buddhist proselytism.

Roman Historical accounts describe an embassy sent by the "Indian king Pandion (Pandey?), also named Porus," to Caesar Augustus around the 1st century. The embassy was travelling with a diplomatic letter in Greek, and one of its members was a sramana who burned himself alive in Athens, to demonstrate his faith. The event made a sensation and was described by Nicolaus of Damascus, who met the embassy at Antioch and related by Strabo (XV,1,73) and Dio Cassius (liv, 9). A tomb was made to the sramana, still visible in the time of Plutarch, which bore the mention: "The sramana master from Barygaza in India".

Other notable buddhist figures include:

- Buddhabhadra - was the founding abbot and patriarch of the Shaolin Temple. Buddhist monk and esoteric master from South India (6th century), Kanchipuram is regarded as the patriarch of the Ti-Lun school. Bodhidharma (c. 6th century) was the Buddhist Bhikkhu traditionally credited as the founder of Zen Buddhism in China.
- Śāntarakṣita - 8th century CE abbot of Nalanda mahavihara
- Nagarjuna - 2nd century CE philosopher
- Atisa - 11th century CE philosopher and abbot of Vikramashila
- Ashoka - Emperor of Magadha in the 3rd century BCE
- Aśvaghoṣa - 2nd century CE composer of the Buddhacharita
- Nagasena - Monk and composer of the Milindapañhā
- Saraha - 8th century mahasiddha
- Moggaliputta-Tissa - Buddhist monk and scholar who presided over the Third Buddhist council in the 3rd century BCE
- Aryadeva - second–third century CE Indian Buddhist author
- Asanga - Scholar-monk from the 4th century CE
- Vasubandhu - Brother of Asanga and also a scholar-monk.
- Shantideva - 8th century monk and composer of the Bodhisattvacaryāvatāra

== See also ==
- Buddhism in Himachal Pradesh
- Buddhism in Kashmir
- Buddhism in North Karnataka
- Index of Buddhism-related articles
- Lord Buddha TV
- Sambuddhatva jayanthi
- Surai Sasai
- Barua Buddhist Institutes in India and Bangladesh
