= Dharmaraksita =

Missionary sent by Mauryan emperor Ashoka to proselytize Buddhism

Dharmarakṣita (Sanskrit, 'Protected by the Dharma'; Pali: Dhammarakkhita), was one of the missionaries sent by the Mauryan emperor Ashoka to proselytize Buddhism. He is described as being a Greek (Pali: Yona, lit. "Ionian") in the Mahavamsa, and his activities are indicative of some Hellenistic Greeks following Buddhism during its early centuries.

Greek communities had been present in neighbouring Bactria and in northwestern India since the time of the conquests of Alexander the Great around 323 BCE, and developed into the Greco-Bactrian Kingdom and the Indo-Greek Kingdom until the end of the 1st century BCE. Greeks were generally described in ancient times throughout the Classical world as "Yona", "Yonaka" or "Yavanas", lit. “Ionians". They were ardent recipients of Buddhism and the example of Dharmarakṣita indicates that they even took an active role in spreading Buddhism as leading missionaries.

== A Greek Buddhist missionary ==
The efforts of Emperor Ashoka to spread the Buddhist faith are described in the Edicts of Ashoka carved during his reign on stone pillars and cave walls:

"Here in the king's domain among the Greeks, the Kambojas, the Nabhakas, the Nabhapamkits, the Bhojas, the Pitinikas, the Andhras and the Palidas, everywhere people are following Beloved-of-the-Gods' instructions in Dhamma." Rock Edict Nb13 (S. Dhammika)

Ashoka also claimed to have sent emissaries beyond his borders, as far as the Greek kings of the Mediterranean:

"Now it is conquest by Dhamma that Beloved-of-the-Gods considers to be the best conquest. And it (conquest by Dhamma) has been won here, on the borders, even six hundred yojanas away, where the Greek king Antiochos rules, beyond there where the four kings named Ptolemy, Antigonos, Magas and Alexander rule, likewise in the south among the Cholas, the Pandyas, and as far as Tamraparni." Rock Edict Nb13 (S. Dhammika)

Dharmaraksita is then described in important Buddhist Pali historical texts, the Dīpavaṃsa and the Mahāvaṃsa, as being a Greek Buddhist missionary, in charge of propagating the faith to the northwestern part of the Indian subcontinent.

"When the thera Moggaliputta, the illuminator of the religion of the Conqueror, had brought the (third) council to an end (…) he sent forth theras, one here and one there:
- The thera Mahyantika he sent to Kasmira and Gandhara,
- The thera, Mahadeva he sent to Mahisamandala.
- To Vanavasa be sent the thera named Rakkhita,
- and to Aparantaka (he sent) the Yona named Dhammarakkhita;
- to Maharattha (he sent) the thera named Mahadhammarakkhita,
- but the thera Maharakkhita he sent into the country of the Yona.
- He sent the thera Majjhima to the Himalaya country,
- and to Suvambhurni he sent the two theras Sona and Uttara.
- The great thera Mahinda, the theras Utthiya, Uttiya, Sambala and Bhaddasala his disciples, these five theras he sent forth with the charge: `Ye shall found in the lovely island of Lanka the lovely religion of the Conqueror.'" (Mahavamsa, XII)

The country of Aparantaka has been identified as the northwestern part of the Indian subcontinent, and comprises Northern Gujarat, Kathiawar, Kachch, and Sindh, the area where Greek communities were probably concentrated.

Dharmarashita is said to have preached the Aggikkhandopama Sutra, so that 37,000 people were converted in Aparantaka and that thousands of men and women entered the Order ("pabbajja"):

"The thera Dhammarakkhita the Yona, being gone to Aparantaka and having preached in the midst of the people the Aggikkhandhopama-sutta gave to drink of the nectar of truth to thirty-seven thousand living beings who had come together there, lie who perfectly understood truth and untruth. A thousand men and yet more women went forth from noble families and received the pabbajja" (Mahavamsa XII, Dipavamsa. VIII.7)

== Dharmaraksita and Punabbasukutumbikaputta Tissa Thera ==
In another Pali reference, a Buddhist monk from Sri Lanka named Punabbasukutumbikaputta Tissa Thera is said to have been to India in order to study with "the Yonaka Dhammarakkhita", whereupon he attained the "patisambhida" (analytical knowledge). (VibhA.389, Sammoha-Vinodaní, Vibhanga Commentary).

The place where Dharmaraksita resides is also said to be around 100 leagues (around 700 miles) from Sri Lanka, putting it somewhere in northern India. (See: )

== Dharmaraksita and the Milinda Panha ==
The Milinda Panha is another famous non-canonical Pāli Buddhist text that describes the religious dialogues between the famous Indo-Greek king Menander, whose kingdom was in Sagala in today's Punjab, and a Buddhist monk called Nagasena, around 160 BCE. It is today one of the texts of reference of Theravada Buddhism.

According to the Milinda Panha (I 32-35), the monk Nagasena, before his encounter with Menander, was once a student of Dharmaraksita and learnt Buddhism and reached enlightenment as an Arhat under his guidance in Pataliputra.

And Assagutta said to him: "Do thou now go, Nâgasena, to Pâtaliputta. There, in the Ashoka Park, dwells the venerable Dhammarakkhita. Under him you should learn the words of the Buddha." (Milinda Panha, I, 32)

Nâgasena went on to the Ashoka Park to Dhammarakkhita. And after saluting him, and telling him on what errand he had come, he learnt by heart, from the mouth of the venerable Dhammarakkhita, the whole of the three baskets of the Buddha's word in three months, and after a single recital, so far as the letter (that is, knowing the words by heart) was concerned. And in three months more he mastered the spirit (that is, the deeper meaning of the sense of the words).

But at the end of that time the venerable Dhammarakkhita addressed him, and said: "Nâgasena, as a herdsman tends the cows, but others enjoy their produce, so thou too carriest in thy head the whole three baskets of the Buddha's word, and still art not yet a partaker of the fruit of Samanaship."

"Though that be so, holy one, say no more," was the reply. And on that very day, at night, he attained to Arahatship and with it to the fourfold power of that Wisdom possessed by all Arahats (that is to say: the realisation of the sense, and the appreciation of the deep religious teaching contained in the word, the power of intuitive judgment, and the power of correct and ready exposition). (Milinda Panha, I, 35)

This event took place roughly a hundred years after the missionary efforts of Ashoka, and it would suggest that Dharmaraksita was a young man under Ashoka, became a respected elder settled in the Ashokan capital of Pataliputra, and then trained a young Nagasena in the Tripiṭaka and towards enlightenment, before Nagasena himself met Menander at a venerable age.

The Milinda Panha therefore seems to relate the dialogue between a great Greek king, Menander I, with a monk trained in Buddhism by the great Greek Buddhist elder Dharmaraksita, tending to suggest the importance of Greeks during the first formative centuries of Buddhism.

== See also ==
- Ashoka's policy of Dhamma
- Edicts of Ashoka
- Greco-Buddhism
- Greco-Buddhist monasticism
- Mahadharmaraksita
