= Mahadharmaraksita =

2nd-century BCE Indo-Greek Buddhist master

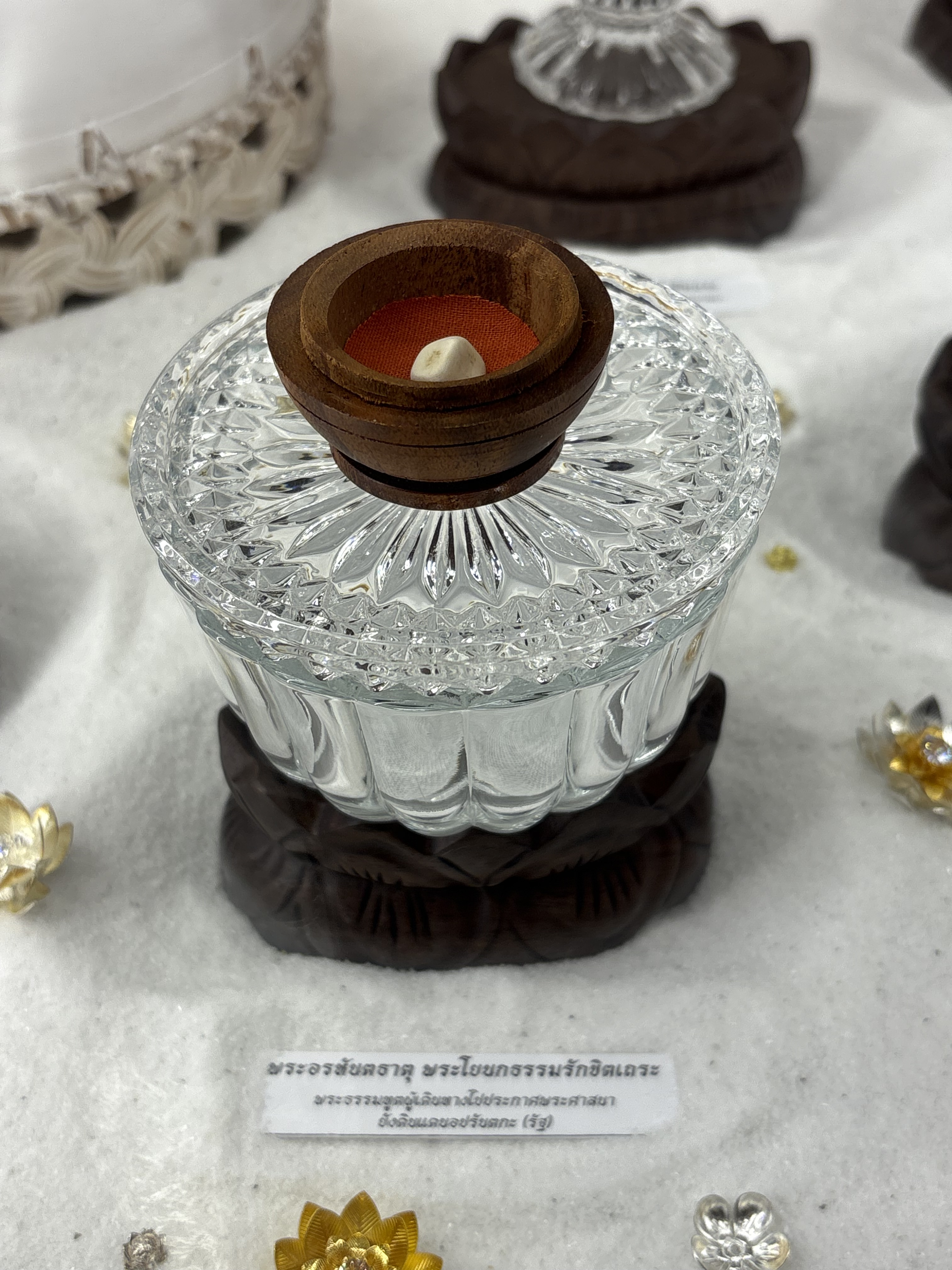
Relics of Mahadharmarakkhita, collection of Wat Pathum Wanaram Temple, Bangkok

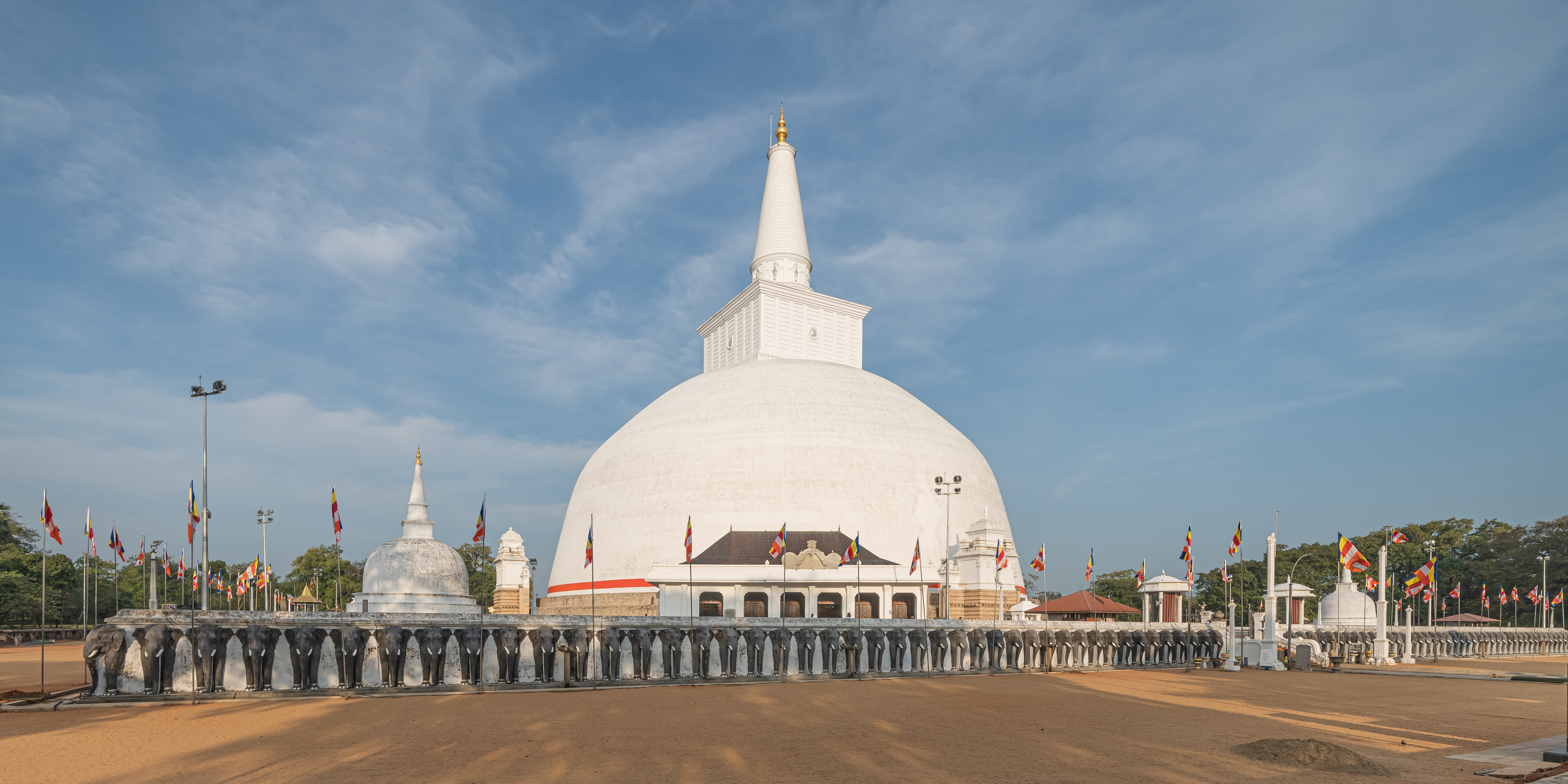
Great Stupa in Anuradhapura, Sri Lanka

Mahadharmarakkhita (Sanskrit: Mahadharmaraksita, literally "Great protector of the Dharma") was a Greek (in Pali:"Yona", Sanskrit: "Yavana", lit. "Ionian") Buddhist master, who lived during the 2nd century BCE during the reign of the Indo-Greek king Menander.

In the Mahavamsa, a key Pali historical text, he is recorded as having travelled from “Alasandra” (thought to be Alexandria of the Caucasus, around 150 kilometers north of today's Kabul, or possibly Alexandria of the Arachosians), with 30,000 monks for the dedication ceremony of the Maha Thupa ("Great stupa") at Anuradhapura in Sri Lanka, when it was completed shortly after the death of the Sri Lankan king Dutthagamani Abhaya (r. 161 - 137 BCE).

The Mahamvasa lists the congregations that visited Sri Lanka for the dedication of the Maha Thupa, explaining that:

"From Alasanda the city of the Yonas came the thera (elder) Yona Mahadhammarakkhita with thirty thousand bhikkhus." (Mahavamsa, XXIX)

This reference is seen as having several implications regarding the role of the Greeks in the Buddhist community at that time:

- Alexandria of the Caucasus or Alexandria of the Arachosians, cities under the control of the Greek king Menander, had a Buddhist monk population of possibly as many as 30,000, indicating a flourishing Buddhist culture under the Greeks.
- The head of this Buddhist community was a Greek (Yona) Buddhist elder whose religious name was Mahadhammarakkhita ("Great protector of the Dharma), indicating the direct involvement of Greeks in the development of the faith, in the northwestern part of the Indian subcontinent.
- They were able to travel unhindered south as far as Sri Lanka, indicating some kind of stable political situation along the west coast of the Indian subcontinent, especially at a time when the Shunga Empire in the east was persecuting Buddhists.

It is also separately established through another text, the Milinda Panha, and archeological evidence that Menander himself ruled a vast empire in northern India, and that he became a Buddhist arhat. According to Buddhist tradition he was a great benefactor of the Buddhist faith, on a par with Ashoka or the Kushan Kanishka.

== See also ==
- Ashoka's policy of Dhamma
- Dharmaraksita
- Greco-Buddhist monasticism
- Edicts of Ashoka
- Greco-Buddhism
- History of Buddhism
