= Greco-Buddhist monasticism =

Ancient religious tendency

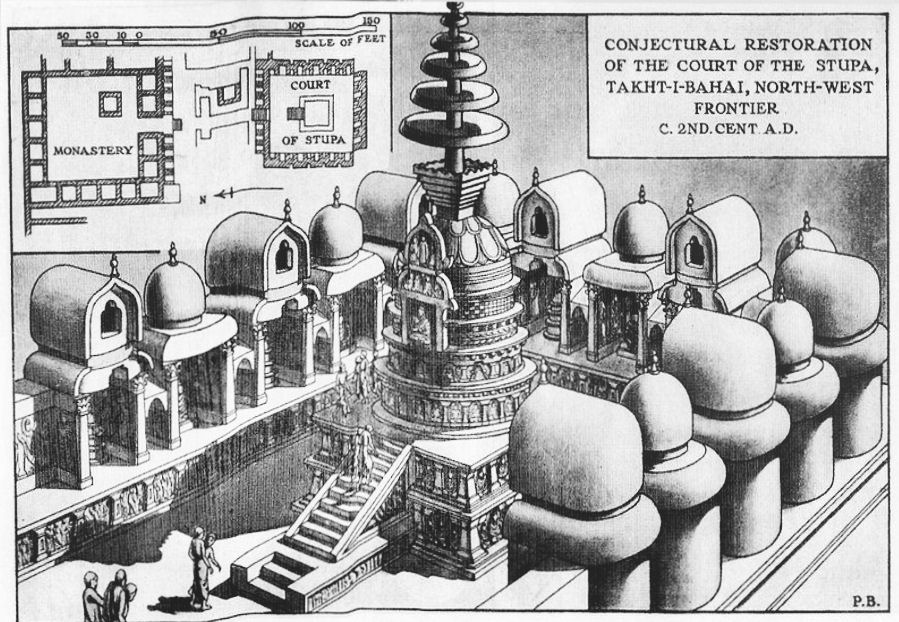
Conjectural restoration of the Takht-i-Bahi stupa.

The role of Greek Buddhist monks in the development of the Buddhist faith under the patronage of Emperor Ashoka around 260 BCE and subsequently during the reign of the Indo-Greek king Menander (r. 165/155–130 BCE) is described in the Mahavamsa, an important non-canonical Theravada Buddhist historical text compiled in Sri Lanka in the 6th century in the Pali language.

The Mahavamsa or "Great Chronicle" covers the history of Buddhism from the 6th century BCE to the 4th century CE. It was written in the 6th century by the monk Mahanama, brother of King Dhatusena of Anuradhapura, and heavily relied on the Dipavamsa or "Island Chronicle" written five centuries earlier.

== Background ==
Emperor Ashoka convened the third Buddhist council around 250 BCE at Pāṭaliputra (today's Patna). It was held by the monk Moggaliputta.

The Pāli Canon, which consists of the Theravada texts of reference and considered to be directly transmitted from the Buddha, was formalized at that time. It is known as the Tipiṭaka or "Three Baskets" and contains doctrine (Sutta Pitaka), monastic discipline (Vinaya Pitaka) and a compendium of philosophy (the Abhidhamma Pitaka).

Another objective of the council was to reconcile the different schools of Buddhism and to purify Buddhism, particularly from opportunistic factions which had been attracted by the royal patronage.

Finally, the council also reported on the proselytizing efforts of Ashoka, who sought to expand the Buddhist faith throughout Asia and as far as the Mediterranean Basin. The contemporary stone inscriptions of the Edicts of Ashoka also relate this activity in detail.

Following these efforts, the Buddhist faith seems to have expanded among Greek communities under the rule of Ashoka, and tens of thousands were converted. About 50 years later, the Greco-Bactrian Kingdom invaded North India as far as Pāṭaliputra and founded the Indo-Greek Kingdom. Buddhism flourished under the Indo-Greek kings, and it has been suggested that their invasion of India was intended to show their support for the Maurya Empire and to protect Buddhism from the religious persecutions of the new Shunga Empire (185–73 BCE). Greek Buddhist monks continued to play a key role during the time of Menander, as far as Sri Lanka.

== Greek monks under Ashoka ==
According to Edicts of Ashoka, Greek populations (generally described in ancient times throughout the Classical world as Yona, Yojanas or Yavanas, lit. "Ionians" ) were under his rule in northwestern India.

Here in the king's domain among the Greeks, the Kambojas, the Nabhakas, the Nabhapamkits, the Bhojas, the Pitinikas, the Andhras and the Palidas, everywhere people are following Beloved-of-the-Gods' instructions in Dhamma.

— S. Dhammika, Edicts of Ashoka, Rock Edict No. 13

Far from just being on the receiving end of conversion to Buddhism, the Mahavamsa indicates that Greeks took an active and crucial role in spreading the Buddhist faith as emissaries of Ashoka.

These Greek missionaries appear in the list of the "elders" (Pali: "thera") sent far and wide by Emperor Ashoka:

"When the thera Moggaliputta, the illuminator of the religion of the Conqueror, had brought the (third) council to an end (…) he sent forth theras, one here and one there:
- The thera Mahyantika he sent to Kasmira and Gandhara,
- The thera, MaMdeva he sent to Mahisamandala.
- To Vanavasa be sent the thera named Rakkhita,
- and to Aparantaka (he sent) the Yona named Dhammarakkhita;
- to Maharattha (he sent) the thera named Mahadhammarakkhita,
- but the thera Maharakkhita he sent into the country of the Yona.
- He sent the thera Majjhima to the Himalaya country,
- and to Suvambhurni he sent the two theras Sona and Uttara.
- The great thera Mahinda, the theras Utthiya, Uttiya, Sambala and Bhaddasala his disciples, these five theras he sent forth with the charge: `Ye shall found in the lovely island of Lanka the lovely religion of the Conqueror.'" (Mahavamsa, XII)

=== Dharmaraksita ===
Dhammarakkhita (Dharmaraksita in Sanskrit), was the Yona (Lit. "Ionian" or "Greek") leader of the mission to Aparantaka.

The country of Aparantaka has been identified as the northwestern part of the Indian subcontinent, and comprises Northern Gujarat, Kathiawar, Kachch, and Sindh, the area where Greek communities were probably concentrated. To this day, a city in Gujarat is named Junagadh, originally "Yonagadh", lit. "City of the Greeks".

Dharmarashita is said to have preached the Aggikkhandopama Sutta, so that 37,000 people were converted in Aparantaka and that thousands of men and women entered the Order (Mahavimsa XII).

According to the Milinda Panha (I 32-35), the monk Nagasena, who famously dialogued with the Greek king Menander I to convert him to Buddhism, was a student of Dharmaraksita, and he reached enlightenment as an arhat under his guidance.

=== Mahyantika ===
The thera (“elder”) Mahyantika was sent to Kashmir and Gandhara, also areas with strong Hellenic presence. Although he is not identified as Greek in the Mahavamsa, his name probably means Maha (great) + Antika (Antiochos), a common Greek first name.

=== Maharaksita ===
The thera (“elder”) Maharakkhita (Maharaksita in Sanskrit) is said to have been sent to the country of the Greeks. He would probably have been Greek as well due to the nature of his mission, but this is unconfirmed.

== Greek monks under Menander ==
The Indo-Greek king Menander I (reigned 160- 135 BCE) had his capital in Sagala, in today’s northern Punjab, and is described by Strabo as one of the most powerful Greek kings of the period, even greater than Alexander the Great.

Menander probably converted to Buddhism, and seems to have encouraged the spread of the faith within the Indian subcontinent, and possibly into Central Asia as well. A documented example of the influence of a Greek Buddhist monk is found in the Mahavamsa again:

=== Mahadharmaraksita ===
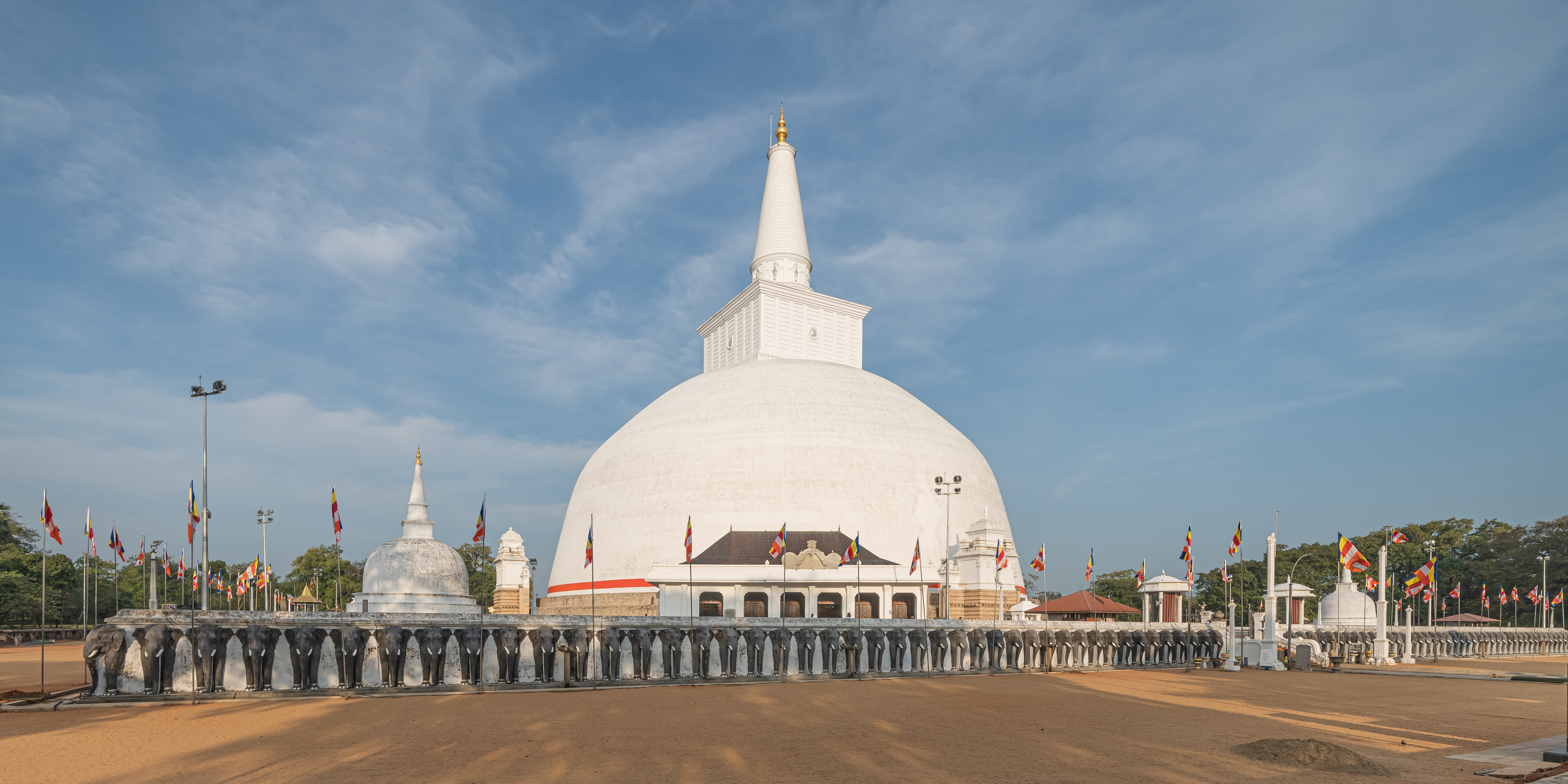
According to the Mahavamsa, the Great Stupa in Anuradhapura, Sri Lanka, was dedicated by a 30,000-strong "Yona" (Greeks) delegation from "Alasandra" around 130 BCE.

During the time of Menander I, the Yona (Ionian) Mahadhammarakkhita (Sanskrit: Mahadharmaraksita) is said to have come from “Alasandra” (thought to be Alexandria of the Caucasus, the city founded by Alexander the Great, near today’s Kabul) with 30,000 monks for the foundation ceremony of the Maha Thupa ("Great stupa") at Anuradhapura in Sri Lanka, during the 2nd century BCE.

"From Alasanda the city of the Yonas came the thera Yona Mahadhammarakkhita with thirty thousand bhikkhus." (Mahavamsa, XXIX)

These elements tend to indicate the importance of Buddhism within Greek communities in northwestern India, and the prominent role Greek Buddhist monks played in them, as well as throughout the Indian subcontinent and possibly as far as the Mediterranean, during the last centuries before the current era.

== See also ==
- Buddhist monasticism & Sangha
- Milinda Panha
- Edicts of Ashoka
- Greco-Buddhism
- Mahadharmaraksita
- Buddhism in Greece
- History of Buddhism
- Ancient Greece–Ancient India relations
