= Nagasena =

Buddhist monk and sage in India c.150 BC

Nāgasena
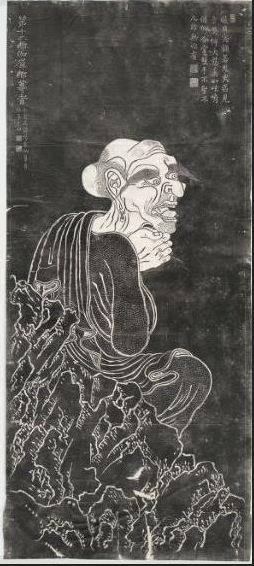
- The Venerable Nāgasena (seated in the middle) conversing with King Menander I
- Title: Thera

Religious life
- Religion: Buddhism
- School: Sarvastivada

Senior posting
- Period in office: c. 150 BCE

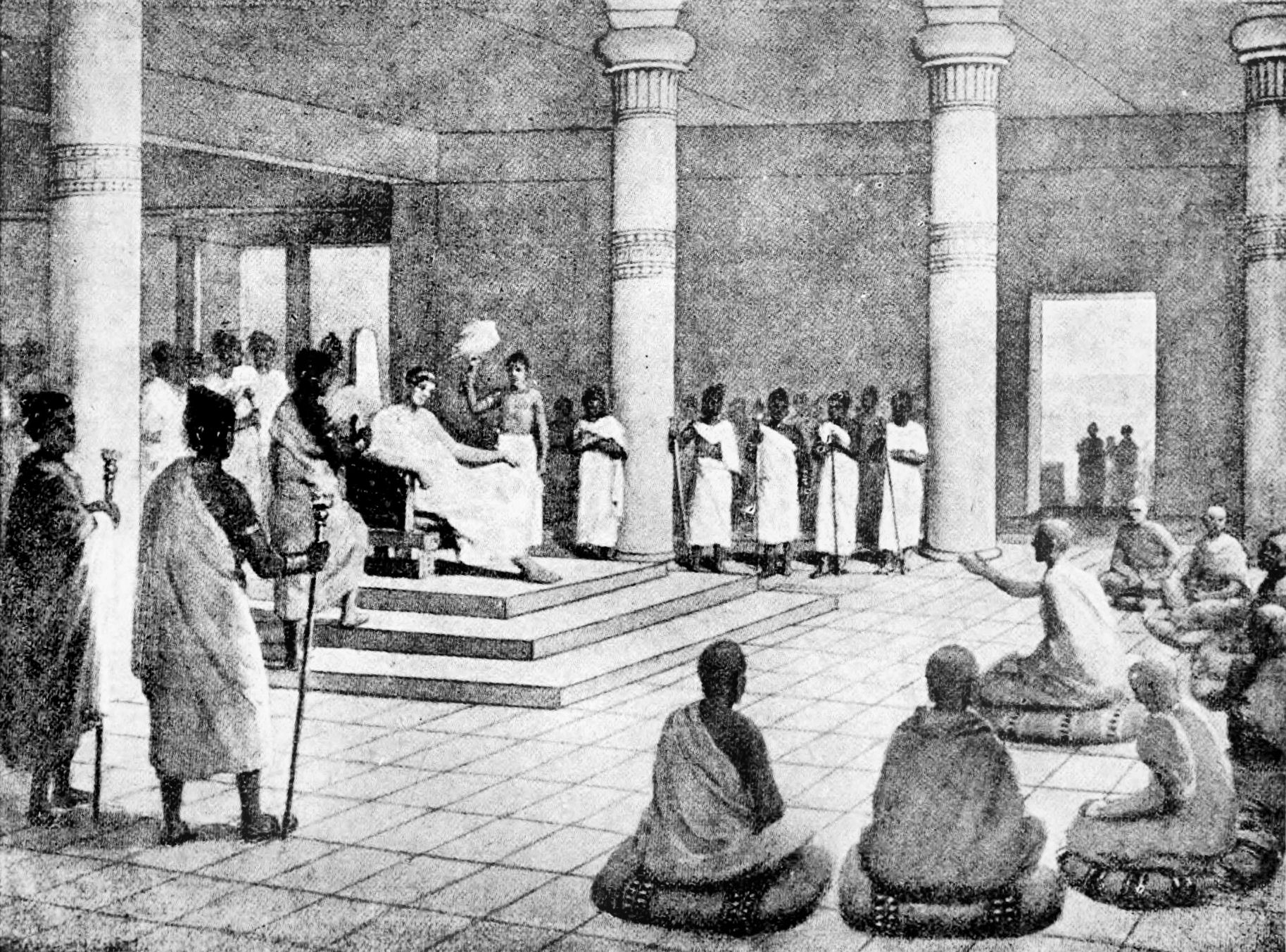
King Milinda and Nāgasena.

Nāgasena was a Sarvāstivādan Buddhist sage who lived around 150 BC. His answers to questions about Buddhism posed by Menander I (Pali: Milinda), the Greek king in northwestern India, are recorded in the Milindapañhā and the Sanskrit Nāgasenabhiksusūtra. According to Pali accounts, he was born into a Brahmin family in the Himalayas and was well-versed in the Vedas at an early age. However, he later converted to Buddhism.

== Milinda Pañha ==
There is almost universal agreement that a core text was later expanded by numerous other authors, following a question and answer pattern established in the early books. The version extant today is very long, and has signs of inconsistent authorship in the later volumes. There is no agreed-upon point at which Nagasena's authorship may be said to end (and the work of other hands begins), nor has this been perceived as an inherently important distinction by monastic scholars.

The text mentions that Nagasena learned the Tripiṭaka under the Greek Buddhist monk Dhammarakkhita near Pātaliputta (modern Patna). He also reached enlightenment and became an arhat under his guidance.

Other personalities mentioned in the text are Nāgasena's father Soñuttara, his teachers Rohana, Assagutta of Vattaniya and another teacher named Āyupāla from Sankheyya near Sāgala.

== Thai tradition ==
There is a tradition that Nagasena brought to Thailand the first representation of the Buddha, the Emerald Buddha. According to this legend, the Emerald Buddha would have been created in India in 43 BC by Nagasena in the city of Pātaliputta.

Nagasena is not known through other sources besides the Milinda Panha and this legend.

== Depictions ==
Nāgasena is one of the Eighteen Arhats of Mahayana Buddhism. His traditional textile depiction shows him holding a khakkhara in his right hand and a vase in his left; an excellent example can be seen on one of the thangkas in the Cleveland Museum of Art collection. "This figure [conforms with the image of] the arhat Nagasena, shown in Jivarama's sketchbook of 1435" who also holds a vase.

A similar depiction can be seen in the collection of Singapore's Asian Civilisations Museum (Qianlong era, 18C: thangka with silk appliqué.)

More modern statues often show a bald, elderly monk scratching his ear with a stick to symbolize purification of the sense of hearing. An adherent of Buddhism should avoid listening to gossip and other nonsense so that they are always prepared to hear the truth.
