= Ashoka's policy of Dhamma =

Set of edicts that formed the policy of the Mauryan Emperor Ashoka

Ashoka The Great
- Maurya Samrat
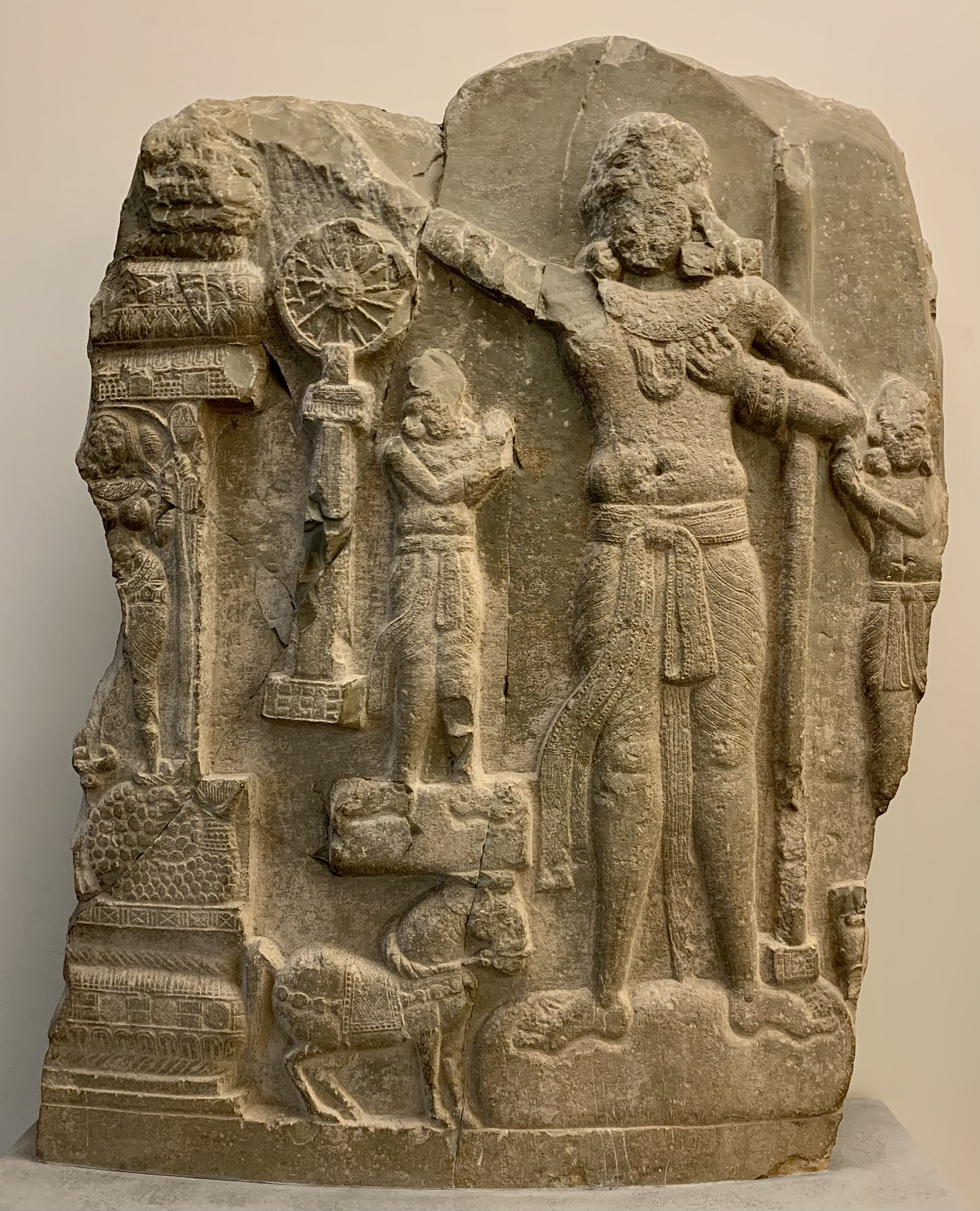
- A "Chakravartin" ruler, 1st century BCE/CE. Andhra Pradesh, Amaravati. Preserved at the Musee Guimet.
- Reign: 268 BCE – 232 BCE
- Coronation: 268 BCE
- Predecessor: Bindusara
- Successor: Dasharatha
- Born: 304 BCE, Close to 8 Aug; Pataliputra, Patna
- Died: 232 BCE (aged 72); Pataliputra, Patna
- Burial: Cremated 232 BCE, less than 24 hours after death Ashes immersed in the Ganges River, possibly at Varanasi
- Dynasty: Maurya
- Religion: Buddhism

Dhamma (Pali: धम्म, romanized: dhamma; Sanskrit: धर्म, romanized: dharma) is a set of norms of social behavior and activities propagated in the edicts of the 3rd Mauryan emperor Ashoka the Great, who succeeded to the Mauryan throne in modern-day India around 269 B.C.E. Ashoka is considered one of the greatest kings of ancient India for his policies of public welfare.

== Definition ==
The word dhamma is the Pāli form of the Sanskrit word dharma. (Note: Dhamma is a broad term in Indian philosophy meaning righteousness, duty, or cosmic law, while Buddha Dharma specifically refers to the teachings of Gautama Buddha, focusing on the Four Noble Truths and the Eightfold Path.) There have been attempts to define and find equivalent English words for it, such as "piety", "moral life" and "righteousness" or "duty" but scholars could not translate it into English because it was coined and used in a specific context. The word Dhamma has multiple meanings in the literature and thought of ancient India. The best way to understand what Ashoka the great means by Dhamma is to read his edicts, which were written to explain the principles of Dhamma to the people of that time throughout the empire.

Dhamma was not a particular religious faith or practice, or an arbitrary formulated royal policy. Dhamma related to generalized norms of social behavior and activities; Ashoka the great tried to synthesize various social norms which were current in his time. It cannot be understood by assuming it is one of the various religions that existed at that time. To understand why and how Ashoka the great formulated Dhamma and its meaning, one must understand the characteristics of the time in which he lived and to refer to Buddhist, Brahmanical and other texts where norms of social behavior are explained.

Some historians link Ashoka’s policy of Dhamma with Buddhism. According to V.A. Smith, Ashoka the great actually became a Buddhist monk for a short span of his life. V.A Smith believes that he was both a monk and a monarch at the same time. D.R. Bhandarkar claims that Ashoka the great was a Buddhist and his policy of dhamma was actually original Buddhism as preached by the Buddha. Radha Kumud Mookerji also formulates that as far as the personal religion of Ashoka is concerned, it may be taken as Buddhism. In recent decades, scholars such as Nayanjot Lahiri and Romila Thapar has argued that Ashoka's Dhamma stands apart from Buddhist ideas, even while being informed by them.

== Historical background ==
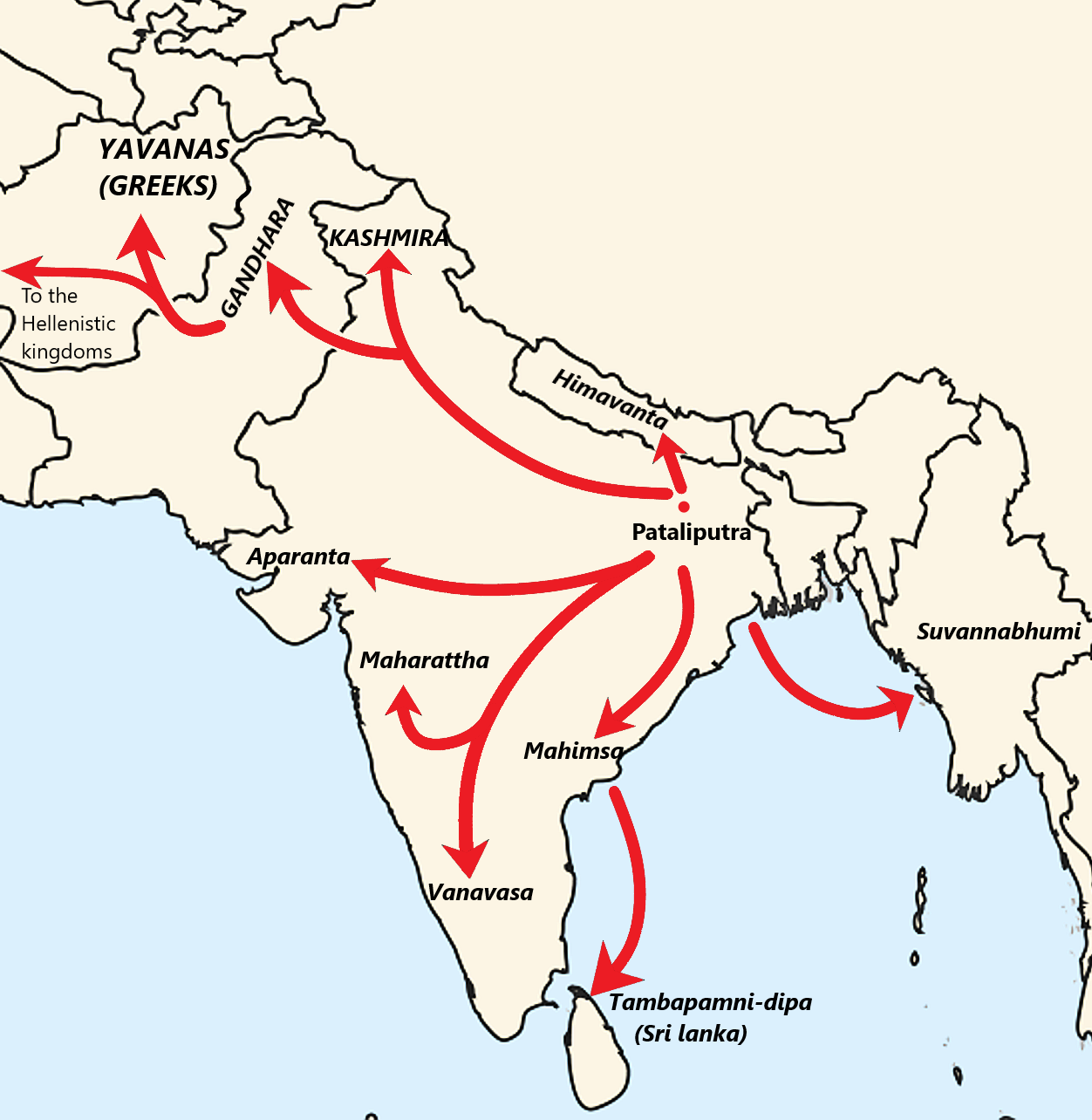
Map depicting Buddhist missions during Emperor Ashoka's reign, reflecting his Dhamma policy spread

=== Socio-economic conditions ===
The Mauryan period saw a change in the economic structure of the society. The use of iron resulted in surplus production, and the economy changed from being a simple rural economy to a pattern of economy in which urban centres became important. The commercial classes had come to the forefront of society. The emergence of urban culture demanded a flexible social organization. The incorporation of tribes and peoples from the outlying areas into the social fabric also presented a problem.

The response of the Brahmanical social order, which was based on the fourfold varna division, was to make the caste system more rigid and deny a higher status to the commercial class. The rigidity of the Brahmanical class system sharpened the divisions within the society. The lower orders turned to various heterodox sects; this created social tensions. It was this situation which emperor Ashoka inherited when he ascended to the Mauryan throne.

== Religious conditions of the Mauryan empire ==
The Brahmanical hold over society, assiduously built through the later Vedic period, was coming under increasing attack. The privileges of the priests, the rigidity of the caste system and the elaborate rituals were being questioned. The lower orders among the four castes began to favour new sects. The Vaishyas, who were technically included in the higher social category, were treated as inferior to both Brahmans and Kshatriya. The opposition of the commercial class to Brahmanism was to give a fillip to the other sects of the society. Buddhism began as schismatic movement from the mainstream outlook of Brahmanism. Its basic tenet was an emphasis on misery and advocacy of the Middle Way. It was a set of ethical principles. Buddhism opposed the dominance of the Brahmans and the concept of sacrifices and rituals. It thus appealed to lower social orders and to emerging social classes. The human approach to relations in society preached by Buddhism further attracted different sections to itself.

=== Polity ===
The Mahajanapada of sixth century B.C. marked the beginning of the state system in many parts of India. Only a small section of society came to have a monopoly of power, which they exercised over the rest of the society. There were gana-samghas in which the rulers were a group of hereditary Kshatriya or members of a clan. By the time Ashoka ascended the throne, the state system had grown very elaborate. It was characterized by:

- The political supremacy of one region (Magadha) over a vast territory which comprised many previous kingdoms, gana-samghas, and areas where no organised states had previously existed;
- Existence within this vast territory of different faiths, beliefs and practices;
- Monopoly of force by a ruling class, of which the emperor was the supreme head;
- Appropriation by the ruling class of surpluses from agriculture, commerce, and other sources.

The complexity of the state system demanded an imaginative policy from the emperor which required minimal use of force in such a large empire having diverse forms of economy and religions. It could not have been controlled by an army alone. A more feasible alternative was the propagation of a policy that would work at an ideological level and engage all sections of the society. The policy of Dhamma was such an endeavor.

== Distribution of inscriptions ==
Location of the Minor Rock Edicts (Edicts 1, 2 & 3)
Other inscriptions often classified as Minor Rock Edicts
Location of the Major Rock Edicts
Location of the Minor Pillar Edicts
Original location of the Major Pillar Edicts
Capital cities

Ashoka the great expounded his policy of Dhamma through his edicts. By engraving his views about Dhamma on these edicts, Ashoka tried to directly communicate with his subjects. These inscriptions were written in different years of his life. The inscriptions can be divided into two categories. A small group of inscriptions reveal that the king was a follower of Buddhism and were addresses to the Buddhist church—the Sangha. These inscriptions are declarations of Ashoka's relationship with the Buddhist order. Inscriptions of the other category are known as the Major and Minor Rock Edicts, which were inscribed on rock surfaces. This larger group includes the Pillar Edicts inscribed on specially erected pillars.

All the sites of Ashokan inscription were chosen carefully to ensure that they were accessible to large numbers of people. These edicts are proclamations to the public at large. They explain the idea of Dhamma. One must make a distinction between Ashoka's policy of Dhamma which stressed social responsibility and Ashoka's own commitment as a Buddhist. There has been a tendency in the past among historians to study the policy of Dhamma and Ashoka as Buddhist in the same context without making any distinction. An examination of the inscriptions suggests that Ashoka declared his personal association with a Buddhist order and on the other he tried to teach, through the policy of Dhamma, the importance of social responsibility and tolerance amongst different members of the society.

== Dhamma ==
The policy of Dhamma was an earnest attempt at solving some of problems and tensions faced by a complex society. Ashoka's private empire were responsible for the formation of the policy. The immediate social environment in which Ashoka grew up influenced him in later years. The Mauryan kings adopted an eclectic outlook. Chandragupta took recourse to Jainism in his later years and Bindusara favoured the Ājīvika. Ashoka adopted Buddhism in his personal life, though he never imposed Buddhism on his subjects.

By the time Ashoka ascended the throne, the Mauryan imperial system had become complex, encompassing various cultures, beliefs and social and political patterns. Ashoka had to either maintain the structure by force—which would incur tremendous expenses—or to define a set of social norms which would be acceptable to all social practices and religious beliefs. He was aware of the tensions which the heterodox sects—Buddhism, Jainism and Ajivikaism—had generated in society. They were all opposed to the domination of the Brahmans and had a growing number of supporters. But Brahmans continued to control society and hostility was inevitable. It was essential to bring about a climate of harmony and mutual trust. There were many areas within the empire where neither the Brahmanical system or the heterodox sects prevailed. Ashoka referred to the country of Yavanas, where neither Brahmanical nor Sramanical culture were in vogue. In many tribal areas, people were unfamiliar with Brahmanical or heterodox ideas. To make the empire survive and to bring some cohesion within the empire in the midst of this diversity, some common patterns of behaviour and common approaches to the society's problems were needed.

== Edicts ==
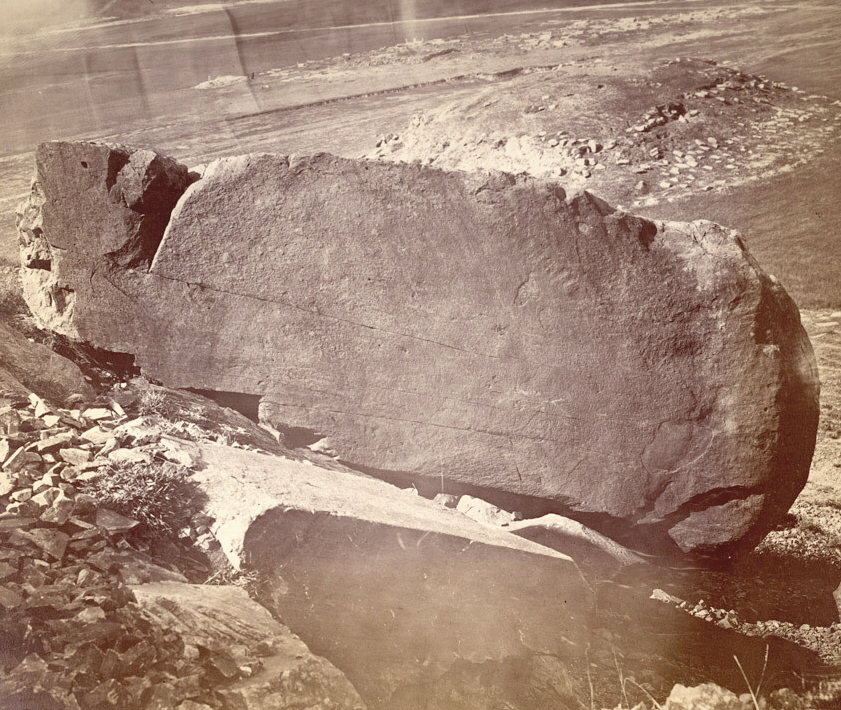
Edicts of Ashoka I-XI in Shahbazgarhi, Peshawar, along the Karakoram Route, now the Karakoram Highway

The principles of Dhamma were formulated to be acceptable to people belonging to different communities and following any religion. Dhamma was not given any formal definition or structure. It emphasized tolerance of people and the notion of showing consideration towards slaves and servants; there is stress on obedience to elders; generosity towards the needy, Brahmans and Sramanas. Ashoka pleaded for tolerance of different religious sects in an attempt to create a sense of harmony. The policy of Dhamma also laid stress on non-violence, which was to be practiced by giving up war and conquests and also as a restraint on the killing of animals. However, Ashoka realized that a certain display of his political might may be necessary to keep the primitive forest-dwelling tribes in check.

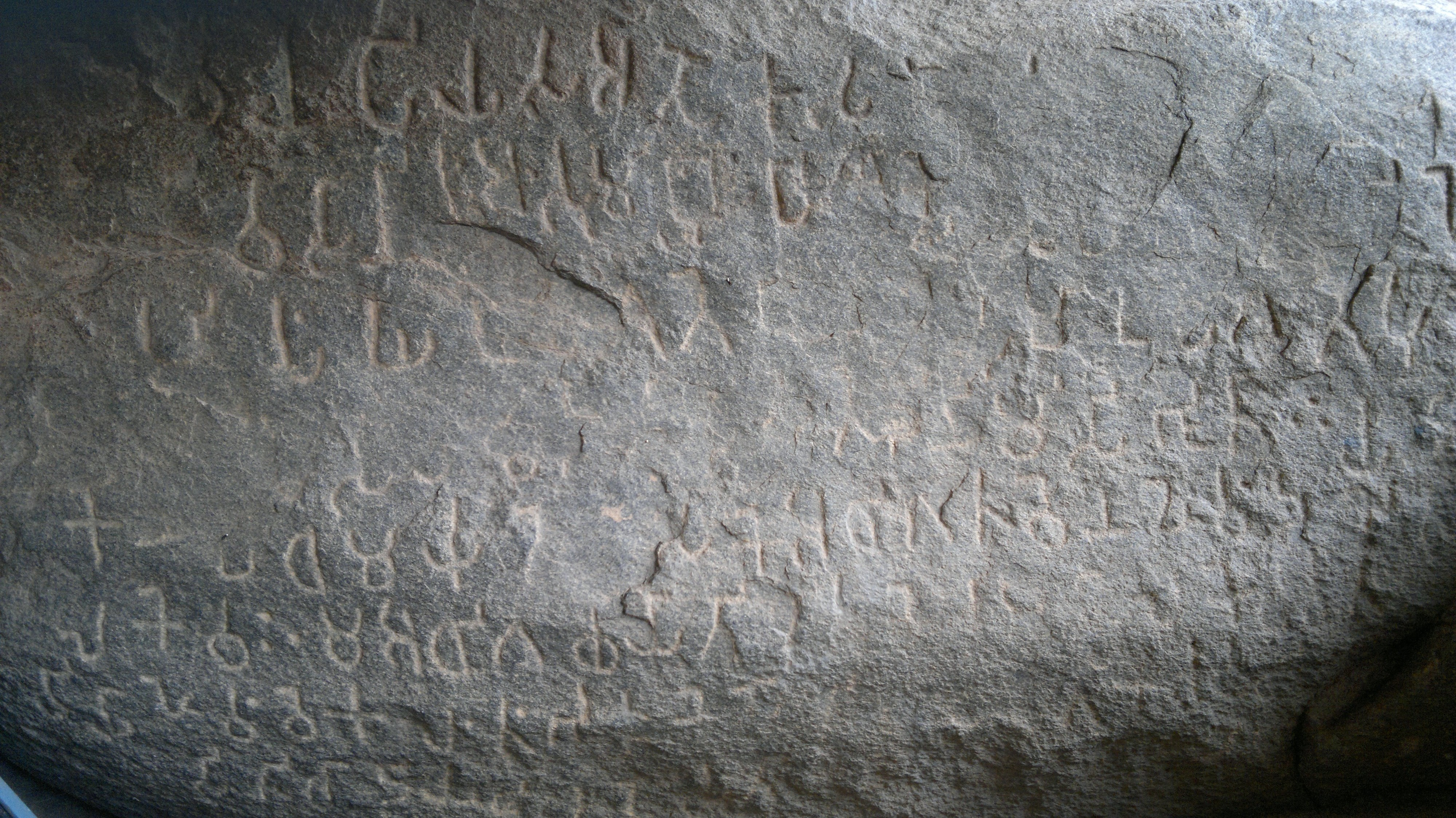
Ashoka's Edict at Maski, Raichur district, Karnataka. This edict confirmed the name Ashoka for "Devanampiya Piadassi".

The policy of Dhamma also included other welfare measures, like the planting of trees and digging of wells. Ashoka attacked ceremonies and sacrifices as meaningless. A group of officers known as Dhamma-mahamattas were instituted to implement and publicize the various aspects of Dhamma. Ashoka made them responsible for carrying his message to various sections of society, However, they gradually developed into a type of priesthood of Dhamma with great powers and soon began to interfere in politics.

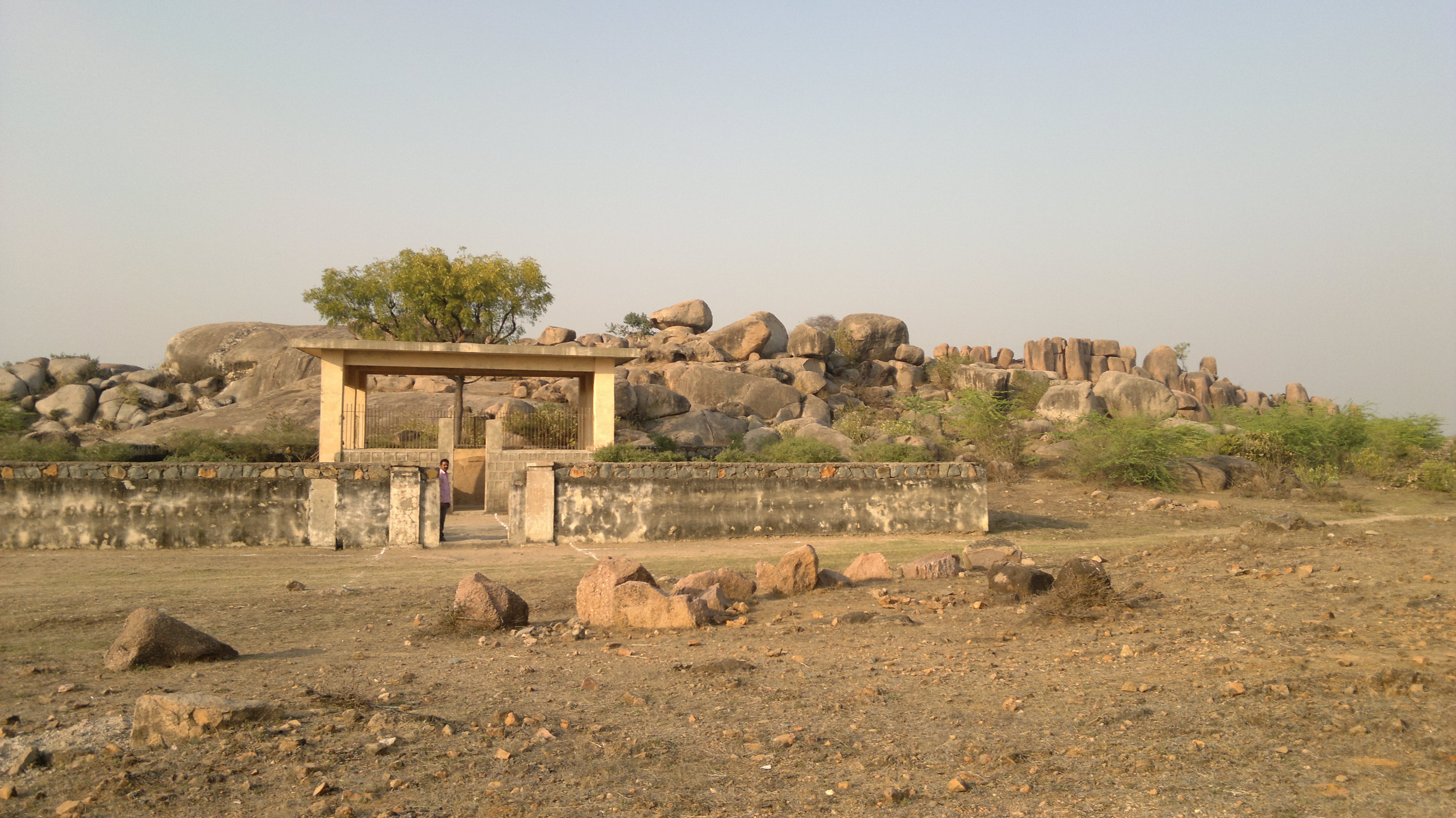
Ashoka's Edict at Gujarra, Madhya Pradesh

The aspects of Dhamma were developed chronologically.

- Major Rock Edict I prohibits animal sacrifice and holidays of festive gathering.
- Major Rock Edict II relates to measures of social welfare. It mentions medical treatment for men and animals, construction of roads, wells and tree planting.
- Major Rock Edict III declares that liberality towards Brahmans and Sramanas is a virtue, and that respecting one's parents is a good quality.
- Major Rock Edict IV comments that because of the policy of Dhamma the lack of morality and disrespect towards Sramanas and Brahmans, violence, unseemly behavior to friends, relatives and others, and evils of this kind have been checked. The killing of animals to a large extent was also stopped.
- Major Rock Edict V refers to the appointment of Dhamma-mahamattas for the first time in the twelfth year of his reign. These special officers were appointed by the king to look after the interests of all sects and religions and spread the message of Dhamma.
- Major Rock Edict VI is an instruction to Dhamma-mahamattas. They are told that they could bring their reports to the king at any time. The second part of the Edict deals with speedy administration and the transaction of smooth business.
- Major Rock Edict VII is a plea for tolerance amongst all sects. It appears from the edict that tensions among the sects were intense perhaps in open antagonism. The plea is a part of the overall strategy to maintain unity.
- Major Rock Edict VIII states that Dhammayatras (tours) would be undertaken by the emperor. The earlier practice of the emperor going out on hunting expeditions was given up. Dhammayatras enabled the emperor to come into contact with various sections of people in the empire.
- Major Rock Edict IX attacks ceremonies performed after birth, illness, marriage and before going on a journey. A censure passed against ceremonies observed by wives and mothers. Ashoka instead lays stress on practice of Dhamma and the uselessness of ceremonies.
- Major Rock Edict X denounces fame and glory and reasserts the merits of following the policy of Dhamma.
- Major Rock Edict XI is a further explanation of the policy of Dhamma. It emphases the respect of elders, abstaining from killing animals, and liberality towards friends.
- Major Rock Edict XII is another appeal for tolerance among sects. This edict reflects the anxiety the king felt because of conflict between sects and carries his plea for harmony.
- Major Rock Edict XIII is of paramount importance in understanding the Ashokan policy of Dhamma. The Rock Edict pleads for conquest by Dhamma instead of war. This is logical culmination of the thought processes which began from the first Rock Edict, and by conquest what is perhaps meant is the adaptation of the policy of Dhamma by a country, rather than its territorial control.
- Major Rock Edict XIV Ashoka said, My dominions are wide, and much has been written, and I shall cause still more to be written. And some of this has been stated again and again because of the charm of certain topics and in order that men should act accordingly.

=== Text of the edicts ===
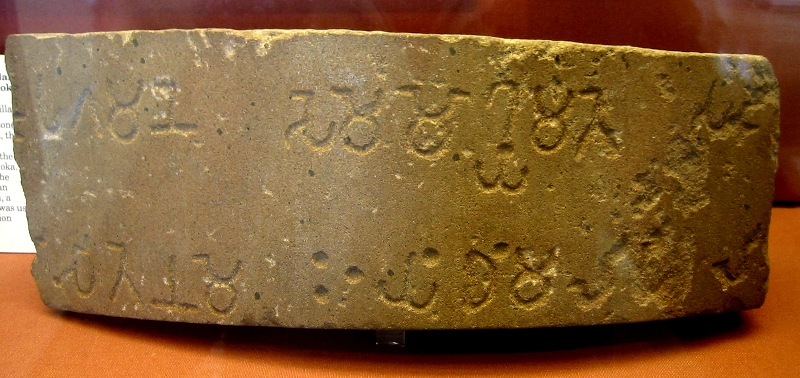
Fragment of the 6th Pillar Edicts of Ashoka (238 BCE), in Brahmi, sandstones. British Museum.

- "When he had been consecrated eight years the Beloved of the Gods, the king Piyadasi Ashoka conquered Kalinga. A hundred and fifty thousand people were deported, a hundred thousand were killed and many times that number perished. Afterwards, now that Kalinga was annexed, the Beloved of the Gods very earnestly practiced Dhamma, desired Dhamma. On conquering Kalinga the Beloved of the Gods felt remorse, for, when an independent country is conquered the slaughter, death, and deportation of people in extremely grievous to the Beloved of the Gods, and weighs heavily on his mind. What is even more deplorable to the Beloved to the Gods is that those who dwell there, whether Brahmans, Sarmanas, or those of other sects, or householders who show obedience to their superiors, obedience to their mother and father, obedience to their teachers and behave well and devotedly to their friends, acquiescence, colleagues, relatives, slaves and servants—all suffer violence, murder and separation from their loved ones. Even those who are fortunate to have escaped, and whose love is undiminished (by the brutalizing effect of war), suffer from the misfortunes of their friends, acquaintances colleagues and relatives. This participation of all men in suffering weighs heavily on the mind of Beloved of the Gods. Except among the Greeks, there is no land where religious orders of Brahmans and Sarmanas are not to be found, and there is no land anywhere where men do not support one sect or another. Today, if a hundredth or thousandth part of those people who were killed or died or were deported when Kalinga was annexed were to suffer similarly, it would weighs heavily on the mind of the Beloved of the Gods."
- "This inscription of Dhamma has been engraved so that any sons or great sons that I may have should not think of gaining new conquests, and in whatever victories they may gain should be satisfied with patience and light punishment. They should only consider conquest by Dhamma to be a true conquest, and delight in Dhamma should be their whole delight, for this is of value in both this world and the next."

This is Ashoka's testament against war. It graphically depicts the tragedy of war and shows why he turned against it. It is a unique event in the annals of the ancient world because one does not knows of any other contemporary monarch who renounced war. Ashoka embarked on the policy of Dhamma after the Kalinga war.

== Dhamma and The Mauryan state ==
Ashoka's Dhamma was not simply a collection of high-sounding phrases. He consciously tried to adopt it as a matter of state policy; he declared that "all men and my children" and "whatever exertion I make, I strive only to discharge debt that I owe to all living creatures." It was a totally new and inspiring idea of kingship. In the Arthashastra, the king owed nothing to anyone. His only job was to rule the state efficiently. Ashoka renounced war and conquest by violence and forbade the killing of many animals. Ashoka set an example of vegetarianism by almost stopping the consumption of meat in the royal household. Since he wanted to conquer the world through love and faith, he sent many missions to propagate Dhamma. Such missions were sent to far off places like Egypt, Greece and Sri Lanka. The propagation of Dhamma included many measures of people's welfare. Centers of the treatment of men and beasts founded inside and outside of empire. Shady groves, wells, orchards and rest houses were laid out. This kind of charity work was a radically different attitude from the king of the Arthashastra, who would not incur any expenses unless they brought more revenues in return.

Ashoka also prohibited useless sacrifices and certain forms of gatherings which led to waste, indiscipline and superstition. To implement these policies he recruited a new cadre of officers called Dhamma-mahamattas. Part of this group's duties was to see that people of various sects were treated fairly. They were especially asked to look after the welfare of prisoners. Many convicts—who were kept in fetters after their sentence had expired—were to be released. Those sentenced to death were to given grace for three days. Ashoka also started Dhamma yatras. He and his high officials were to tour the country propagating Dhamma and establishing direct contact with his subjects. Because of such attitudes and policies, modern writers like Kern called him "a monk in a king's garb."

== Interpretations ==
The Ashokan policy of Dhamma has been the subject of controversy and debate amongst scholars; Some have said that Ashoka was a partisan Buddhist and have equated Dhamma with Buddhism. It has also been suggested · that it was the original Buddhist thought that was being preached by Ashoka as Dhamma and later on certain theological additions were made to Buddhism. This kind of thinking is based on some Buddhist chronicles. It is believed that the Kalinga war was a dramatic turning point where out of remorse for the death and destruction of war, Ashoka decided to become Buddhist. The Buddhist records credit him with the propagation of Buddhism in India and abroad. As an emperor, Ashoka did not favour Buddhism at the expenses of other religions.

According to Ramesh Chandra Majumdar, Dhamma was not the policy of a heretic but a system of beliefs created out of different religious faiths. There has been some discussion among historians about the results Ashoka's propagation of Dhamma. Some historians believe that Ashoka's ban of sacrifices and the favour that he showed to Buddhism led to a Brahmanical reaction, which in turn led to the decline of Mauryan empire. Others believe that stopping of wars and the emphasis on non-violence crippled the military might of the empire, leading to its collapse after the death of Ashoka.

According to Romila Thapar, Ashoka's Dhamma is a superb document of his essential humanity and an answer to the socio-political needs of the contemporaneous situation. It was not anti-Brahmanical because respect for the Brahmans and Sarmanas is an integral part of his Dhamma. His emphasis on non-violence did not blind him to the needs of the state. In fact, he envisioned bureaucrats as doing the work of ensuring ethical progress on the part of his subjects. Also, Ashoka warned the forest tribes that although he hates to use coercion, he may be required to resort to force if they continued to create trouble. By the time Ashoka stopped war, the entire Indian sub-continent was under his control. In the south he was on friendly terms with the Cholas and Pandyas. Sri Lanka was an admiring ally. Thus, Ashoka's decline of war came when his empire had reached its natural boundaries. The plea for tolerance was a wise course of action in an ethnically diverse, religiously varied, and class divided society. Ashoka's empire was a conglomerate of diverse groups; farmers, pastoral nomads and hunter-gatherers, there were Greeks, Kambojas, and Bhojas and hundreds of groups with different traditions. In this situation a plea for tolerance was needed. Ashoka tried to transcend the parochial cultural traditions with a board set of ethical principles.

Ashoka's Dhamma could not survive him; as such it was a failure. However, he was not establishing a new religion but was trying to impress upon the society the need for ethical and moral principles.

== See also ==
- Ashokavadana
- Buddhist ethics
- Noble Eightfold Path
- Upāsaka
- Edicts of Ashoka
- Ashokan Edicts in Delhi
- Pillars of Ashoka
- Major Rock Edicts
- Shanti Stupa, Ladakh
- Kanaganahalli
- Minor Rock Edicts
- List of Edicts of Ashoka
