= Robert Linssen =

Belgian author

Robert Linssen (11 April 1911 – 15 May 2004) was a Belgian Zen Buddhist and author. Linssen wrote in French, but many of his texts have been translated into other languages including English. Like other Western authorities on the subject of Zen Buddhism (such as the author Alan Watts), Linssen's ideas about Buddhism in general and Zen Buddhism in particular have been influential both to practitioners of Zen and to academics.

== Works ==
- Living Zen (Essai sur le bouddhisme en général et sur le zen en particulier.). 1954.
- Zen: The wisdom of the East, a new way of life (Le Zen: Sagesse d'Extreme-Orient: Un Nouvel Art De Vivre?). 1969.
- Zen: The Art of Life
- Spiritualite de la matiere
- La Meditation veritable: Etude des pulsions pre-mentales
- Amour, Sexe et Spiritualité
- Au-delà du mirage de l'égo
- Au-delà du hasard et de l'anti-hasard
- Science et spiritualité
- Krishnamurti psychologue de l'ère nouvelle
- La Mutation Spirituelle Du IIIe Millenaire
- L'eveil supreme: Bases pratiques du Ch'an, du Zen et de la pensee de Krishnamurti (1974)
