= 100s BC (decade) =

Decade

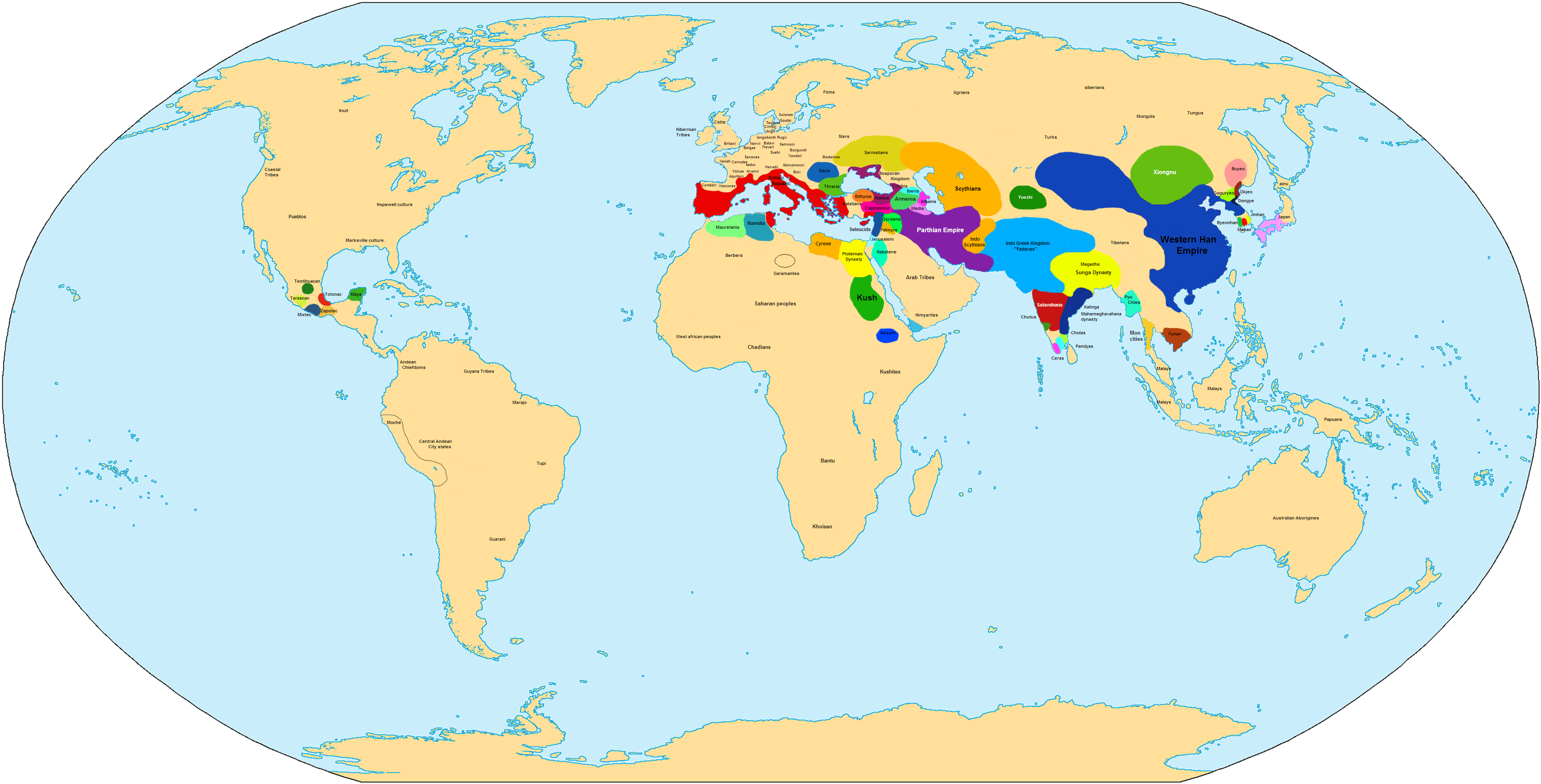
Map of the world in 100 BC

This article concerns the period 109 BC – 100 BC.

== Events ==
=== 109 BC ===
==== By place ====
====== Roman Republic ======
- A Roman army under Marcus Junius Silanus is defeated by the Cimbri and Teutones near the river Rhône.

====== Asia ======
- Emperor Wu of Han inspects the Han Empire, traveling 9,000 km (5,600 mi). He also sends diplomats to search for the legendary Penglai Island.
- Han campaigns against Dian: Emperor Wu launches a new campaign against the Dian Kingdom and establishes the Yizhou commandery in Yunnan during the dynasty's expansion southward.
- Han invasion of Gojoseon

- After She He, a Han envoy, murders a minor king of the vassal state of Gojoseon and is rewarded by Emperor Wu with a military command, Ugeo, the king of Gojoseon, attacks and kills She He.
- Autumn – Emperor Wu orders the invasion. The Han general Yang Pu crosses the Yellow Sea and marches on the capital Wangxian (Pyongyang) but is defeated outside its gates. Another general, Xun Zhi, invades overland but fails to make headway.
- Peace negotiations are initiated by Emperor Wu but fail due to mutual suspicion.

- The Han general Zhao Ponu and 700 cavalrymen are victorious in the Battle of Loulan in the Tarim Basin, capturing the king of Loulan in the first Han intervention west of the Hexi Corridor.

=== 108 BC ===
==== By place ====
====== Roman Republic ======
- Roman forces under Quintus Caecilius Metellus Numidicus defeat the forces of Jugurtha of Numidia at the Battle of the Muthul, with Gaius Marius as a subordinate.

====== Asia ======
- Han conquest of Gojoseon

- The Han generals Yang Pu and Xun Zhi besiege Wangxian (Pyongyang), the capital of Gojoseon. Infighting between the generals leads Xun Zhi to arrest Yang Pu.
- Summer – After being deserted by some of his officials, king Ugeo of Gojoseon is assassinated. Cheng Yi takes over the defense of Wangxian but is killed by Han sympathizers.
- Han subjugates Gojoseon and divides it into four prefectures. Xun Zhi is executed for infighting.

- Emperor Wu of Han founds Jiuquan in the Hexi Corridor as a military outpost on the Silk Road to Central Asia. It serves to protect diplomats and merchants, and it cuts off the kings of the region from the Xiongnu. He also founds Xianlei in present-day Inner Mongolia, extending Han control further north than before.

=== 107 BC ===
==== By place ====
====== Crimea ======
- The uprising of Saumachus against Mithridates VI in the Bosporan Kingdom.

====== Roman Republic ======
- Gaius Marius, to whom the putative Marian reforms of the Roman army are commonly attributed, arrives in North Africa to lead the war against Jugurtha, with a young quaestor named Lucius Cornelius Sulla as a subordinate.

=== 106 BC ===
==== By place ====
====== Roman Republic ======
- The Romans under Quintus Servilius Caepio seize the Gold of Tolosa while recapturing the Volcae town.

====== Anatolia ======
- Nicomedes III of Bithynia and Mithridates VI of Pontus share their dominion over Paphlagonia.

====== China ======
- Following the death of General-in-Chief Wei Qing, his sister Empress Wei Zifu and nephew Crown Prince Liu Ju begin to lose influence at court.

=== 105 BC ===
==== By place ====
====== Roman Republic ======
- January 1 (Note: October 2 in the Julian calendar.) – Gnaeus Mallius Maximus and Publius Rutilius Rufus become Roman consuls.
- October 6 – The Battle of Arausio, where the Cimbri destroy two Roman armies on the Rhône, is the most severe defeat of Roman forces since the Battle of Cannae.
- Gaius Marius, together with the consul Publius Rutilius Rufus, initiates sweeping reforms of the Roman army.
- Lucius Cornelius Sulla secures the capture of Jugurtha. His success is made possible by the treachery of Bocchus I, king of Mauretania, and this ends the Jugurthine War (which began in 112 BC).
- At Rome, the first official gladiator match is demonstrated by gladiators from Capua, as part of a training program for the military.

====== Asia ======
- The Han dynasty forms an alliance with the Wusun by marrying a Han princess to their king.
- Wuwei Chanyu of the Xiongnu dies and is succeeded by his youthful son Er Chanyu. That winter heavy snowstorms lead to the deaths of many livestock, and there is discontent with the new ruler, who is regarded as belligerent.

=== 104 BC ===
==== By place ====
====== Roman Republic ======
- Rome enacts a state of emergency, as the way to Italy lays open to the Germanic invaders. Gaius Marius, the conqueror of Jugurtha, is elected consul for the second time. He celebrates his triumph over Jugurtha, who is led in the procession and thrown into the Tullianum where he dies of starvation.
- Second Servile War: Athenion starts a slave rebellion in Segesta (Sicily).

====== Judea ======
- Aristobulus I succeeds John Hyrcanus, becoming king and high priest of Judea, until 103 BC.

====== Asia ======
- War of the Heavenly Horses: Emperor Wu of Han sends an army of 6000 cavalrymen and 10,000 convicts under Li Guangli to attack Dayuan in modern Kyrgyzstan after Wugua, the king of Dayuan, refuses to send the Han any of the prized horses of Dayuan and, following a contentious meeting with the Han diplomats, has a vassal king kill the diplomats and seize their goods. The Han expeditionary force proceeds with difficulty, marching through arid regions and facing hostile cities.

=== 103 BC ===
==== By place ====
====== Roman Republic ======
- Gaius Marius prepares a campaign against the Ambrones and Teutones (under king Teutobod) who are settled in Gaul.
- Tryphon and Athenion lead the Second Servile War in Sicily.

====== Judea ======
- Alexander Jannaeus succeeds his brother Aristobulus I as king and high priest of Judea, until 76 BC.

====== Asia ======
- War of the Heavenly Horses

- After having fought their way west across arid regions, the Han expeditionary force under Li Guangli fails to capture the Dayuan city of Yucheng and returns east to the area of Dunhuang, having lost 90% of their men.
- Emperor Wu of Han reinforces Li Guangli's army with 60,000 men, numerous horses and beasts of burden, and more than fifty high-ranking officers. Li Guangli's army then returns west.

- Han-Xiongnu War

- Spring – After the Xiongnu Left Commander offers to kill Er Chanyu and surrender to the Han, Emperor Wu sends the Han general Zhao Ponu with an army of 20,000 to invade Xiongnu territory. When Zhao reaches the Altay Mountains, the commander's conspiracy is discovered, and after killing the commander, Er marches against Zhao but suffers an initial defeat.
- Summer – The Han army retreats south, but the Xiongnu surround them. After capturing Zhao Ponu during the night, the Xiongnu defeat and force the surrender of the Han soldiers.
- The Xiongnu invade parts of China and unsuccessfully attack Shouxiang.

=== 102 BC ===
==== By place ====
====== Roman Republic ======
- Gaius Marius defeats the Sciri and Teutones at Aix-en-Provence (or Battle of Aquae Sextae).
- Marcus Marius was likely elected praetor for 102 BC.
- The Cimbri defeat the Consul Quintus Lutatius Catulus in the Adige Valley.

====== Asia ======
- War of the Heavenly Horses: the Han expeditionary force under Li Guangli conquers the state of Luntai. Li Guangli then besieges Alexandria Eschate, the capital of Dayuan in the Hellenistic Ferghana Valley, despite having lost half his army to hunger, thirst and battle by the time he reached the city. The Dayuan are defeated in battle, and after losing their outer wall and their best general Jianmi in battle, the nobles kill King Wugua and offer terms of peace to Li Guangli, who accepts. The Han receive some of the prized horses of Dayuan and Li Guangli appoints Mocai as the new king.
- Han-Xiongnu War

- Er Chanyu marches against Shouxiang but dies en route from illness and is succeeded by his uncle Xulihu.
- Emperor Wu orders fortified outposts to be built to the north as far as the Yin Mountains and Juyan Lake. The generals Han Yue and Wei Kang garrison the outposts north of Wuyuan, including the Yin Mountains, and Lu Bode garrisons Juyan Lake.
- Autumn – The Xiongnu invade the prefectures of Yunzhong, Dingxiang, Wuyuan and Shuofang and destroy the new Han outposts. The Tuqi King of the Right invades the area around Jiuquan and Zhangye. The Han general Ren Wen defeats a Xiongnu army.

=== 101 BC ===
==== By place ====
====== Roman Republic ======
- July 30 – Battle of Vercellae (Battle of the Raudine Plain or Battle of Campi Raudii): The Roman consuls Gaius Marius and Manius Aquillius defeat the Cimbri.

====== Libya ======
- Ptolemy Apion inherits the kingdom of Cyrenaica.

====== Asia ======
- War of the Heavenly Horses: Han general Li Guangli detaches forces to attack Yucheng. After a failed attack by Wang Shengshen and Hu Chongguo, in which Wang is killed, a new Han detachment under Shangguan Jie defeats and captures the king of Yucheng. The king is then killed by the soldiers escorting him to Li Guangli.
- Han-Xiongnu War: At the beginning of the year, Xulihu Chanyu dies from illness and is succeeded by Qiedihou Chanyu. Qiedihou releases the Han envoys detained by the Xiongnu and receives gifts from Emperor Wu of Han.

=== 100 BC ===
==== By place ====
====== Roman Republic ======
- Consuls: Lucius Valerius Flaccus, Gaius Marius (Marius's sixth consulship).
- Manius Aquillius celebrates an ovation for victories in the Second Servile War.
- Lucius Appuleius Saturninus, a tribune, passes a law to redistribute land to military veterans. The law requires that all senators swear to abide by it. Quintus Caecilus Metellus Numidicus refuses and is exiled. He goes to Rhodes to study philosophy.
- Late summer–autumn: Saturninus stands for tribune again for the following year, and is elected. His associate, the praetor Gaius Servilius Glaucia, attempts to stand for the consulship (illegally, as praetors cannot immediately become consul). A rival candidate, Gaius Memmius, is found murdered by agents of Saturninus and Glaucia, who are declared public enemies by the Senate. The Senate issues the senatus consultum ultimum, and Marius, as consul, defeats his former ally in battle in the Forum. Saturninus and his followers surrender on condition that their lives are spared, but they are stoned to death with roof tiles in the Curia Hostilia by renegade senators.
- The building of the Sanctuary of Fortuna Primigenia, Palestrina, Italy, is begun. The model of it is now kept at the Museo Archeologico Nazionale, Italy (approximate date).

====== Asia Minor ======
- Tigranes II of Armenia is placed on the Armenian throne by the Parthians in exchange for the cession of "seventy valley" (approximate date).

====== Judea ======
- The deuterocanonical books of 1 and 2 Maccabees are written.

====== India ======
- Gandhara and Punjab are ruled by the Indo-Greek king Demetrius III Aniketos.

====== China ======
- War of the Heavenly Horses: the Han expedition under Li Guangli returns victorious to China. He is followed by dynastic representatives sent by various Central Asian kings, so that they may pay tribute to Emperor Wu of Han. Emperor Wu keeps these representatives as hostages and sends soldiers to build pavilions and reclaim wasteland along the route to the west to provide food and shelter for Han envoys.
- Han-Xiongnu War: the Han general Zhao Ponu escapes Xiongnu custody and returns to China.

====== America ======
- Mural room in the Maya pyramid at San Bartolo, Guatemala, painted.

== Births ==
108 BC

- Lucius Sergius Catilina, Roman politician (d. 62 BC)

106 BC

- Cicero, Roman politician and author (d. 43 BC)
- September 29 – Pompey the Great, Roman general and politician (d. 48 BC)
- Servius Sulpicius Rufus, Roman politician (d. 43 BC)

105 BC

- Decimus Laberius, Roman nobleman and Latin writer (d. 43 BC)
- Tiberius Claudius Nero, Roman politician and general
- Marcus Atius Balbus, Roman praetor and governor (d. 51 BC)

104 BC

- Julia, mother of Mark Antony
- Servilia, mistress of Julius Caesar

103 BC

- Marcus Furius Bibaculus, Roman poet.

102 BC

- Quintus Tullius Cicero, Roman general and statesman (d. 43 BC)

101 BC

- July 13–Julius Caesar

100 BC

- Julius Caesar, Roman general and politician (d. 44 BC)
- Titus Labienus, Caesar's chief lieutenant in the conquest of Gaul (d. 45 BC)

== Deaths ==
109 BC

- Paerisades V, king of the Bosporan Kingdom (approximate date)
- Sames II Theosebes Dikaios, king of Commagene

108 BC

- Marcus Livius Drusus (the Elder), Roman consul
- Ugeo of Gojoseon, king of Wiman Joseon (Korea)

107 BC

- Lucius Cassius Longinus

106 BC

- Wei Qing, Chinese general of the Han dynasty

105 BC

- Marcus Aurelius Scaurus, Roman politician and general, executed as a prisoner of war in the advent of the Battle of Arausio

104 BC

- Dong Zhongshu, Chinese scholar who promoted Confucianism at the central court of the Han dynasty (b. 179 BC)
- Gnaeus Domitius Ahenobarbus, Roman consul and general
- John Hyrcanus, prince and high priest of Judea (b. 164 BC)
- Jugurtha, king of Numidia (execution by Rome) (b. c. 160 BC)

103 BC

- Aristobulus I, king of Judea.
- Gaius Lucilius, Roman satirist
- Khallata Naga of Anuradhapura, king of the Anuradhapura Kingdom

101 BC

- Boiorix, king of the Cimbri (killed at the Battle of Vercellae)
- Cleopatra III, queen of the Ptolemaic Kingdom (assassinated by her son Ptolemy X Alexander I)

100 BC

- Cornelia, mother of Tiberius Gracchus (b. c. 190 BC)
- Gaius Memmius, Roman politician
- Gaius Servilius Glaucia, Roman politician
- Lucius Appuleius Saturninus, Roman politician
- Salvius Tryphon, Rebel slave
- Theodosius of Bithynia, Greek astronomer and mathematician (b. c. 169 BC)
