= 103 BC =

103 BC in various calendars
- Gregorian calendar: 103 BC; CIII BC
- Ab urbe condita: 651
- Ancient Egypt era: XXXIII dynasty, 221
- Pharaoh: Ptolemy X Alexander, 5
- Ancient Greek Olympiad (summer): 169th Olympiad, year 2
- Assyrian calendar: 4648
- Balinese saka calendar: N/A
- Bengali calendar: −696 – −695
- Berber calendar: 848
- Buddhist calendar: 442
- Burmese calendar: −740
- Byzantine calendar: 5406–5407
- Chinese calendar: 丁丑年 (Fire Ox); 2595 or 2388 — to — 戊寅年 (Earth Tiger); 2596 or 2389
- Coptic calendar: −386 – −385
- Discordian calendar: 1064
- Ethiopian calendar: −110 – −109
- Hebrew calendar: 3658–3659
- Hindu calendars
- Vikram Samvat: −46 – −45
- Shaka Samvat: N/A
- Kali Yuga: 2998–2999
- Holocene calendar: 9898
- Iranian calendar: 724 BP – 723 BP
- Islamic calendar: 746 BH – 745 BH
- Javanese calendar: N/A
- Julian calendar: N/A
- Korean calendar: 2231
- Minguo calendar: 2014 before ROC 民前2014年
- Nanakshahi calendar: −1570
- Seleucid era: 209/210 AG
- Thai solar calendar: 440–441
- Tibetan calendar: མེ་མོ་གླང་ལོ་ (female Fire-Ox); 24 or −357 or −1129 — to — ས་ཕོ་སྟག་ལོ་ (male Earth-Tiger); 25 or −356 or −1128

Year 103 BC was a year of the pre-Julian Roman calendar. At the time it was known as the Year of the Consulship of Marius and Orestes (or, less frequently, year 651 Ab urbe condita) and the Second Year of Taichu. The denomination 103 BC for this year has been used since the early medieval period, when the Anno Domini calendar era became the prevalent method in Europe for naming years.

== Events ==
=== By place ===
==== Roman Republic ====
- Gaius Marius prepares a campaign against the Ambrones and Teutones (under king Teutobod) who are settled in Gaul.
- Tryphon and Athenion lead the Second Servile War in Sicily.

==== Judea ====
- Alexander Jannaeus succeeds his brother Aristobulus I as king and high priest of Judea, until 76 BC.

==== Asia ====
- War of the Heavenly Horses

- After having fought their way west across arid regions, the Han expeditionary force under Li Guangli fails to capture the Dayuan city of Yucheng and returns east to the area of Dunhuang, having lost 90% of their men.
- Emperor Wu of Han reinforces Li Guangli's army with 60,000 men, numerous horses and beasts of burden, and more than fifty high-ranking officers. Li Guangli's army then returns west.

- Han-Xiongnu War

- Spring – After the Xiongnu Left Commander offers to kill Er Chanyu and surrender to the Han, Emperor Wu sends the Han general Zhao Ponu with an army of 20,000 to invade Xiongnu territory. When Zhao reaches the Altay Mountains, the commander's conspiracy is discovered, and after killing the commander, Er marches against Zhao but suffers an initial defeat.
- Summer – The Han army retreats south, but the Xiongnu surround them. After capturing Zhao Ponu during the night, the Xiongnu defeat and force the surrender of the Han soldiers.
- The Xiongnu invade parts of China and unsuccessfully attack Shouxiang.

== Births ==
- Marcus Furius Bibaculus, Roman poet.

== Deaths ==
- Aristobulus I, king of Judea.
- Gaius Lucilius, Roman satirist
- Khallata Naga of Anuradhapura, king of the Anuradhapura Kingdom
