= 105 BC =

105 BC in various calendars
- Gregorian calendar: 105 BC; CV BC
- Ab urbe condita: 649
- Ancient Egypt era: XXXIII dynasty, 219
- Pharaoh: Ptolemy X Alexander, 3
- Ancient Greek Olympiad (summer): 168th Olympiad, year 4
- Assyrian calendar: 4646
- Balinese saka calendar: N/A
- Bengali calendar: −698 – −697
- Berber calendar: 846
- Buddhist calendar: 440
- Burmese calendar: −742
- Byzantine calendar: 5404–5405
- Chinese calendar: 乙亥年 (Wood Pig); 2593 or 2386 — to — 丙子年 (Fire Rat); 2594 or 2387
- Coptic calendar: −388 – −387
- Discordian calendar: 1062
- Ethiopian calendar: −112 – −111
- Hebrew calendar: 3656–3657
- Hindu calendars
- Vikram Samvat: −48 – −47
- Shaka Samvat: N/A
- Kali Yuga: 2996–2997
- Holocene calendar: 9896
- Iranian calendar: 726 BP – 725 BP
- Islamic calendar: 748 BH – 747 BH
- Javanese calendar: N/A
- Julian calendar: N/A
- Korean calendar: 2229
- Minguo calendar: 2016 before ROC 民前2016年
- Nanakshahi calendar: −1572
- Seleucid era: 207/208 AG
- Thai solar calendar: 438–439
- Tibetan calendar: ཤིང་མོ་ཕག་ལོ་ (female Wood-Boar); 22 or −359 or −1131 — to — མེ་ཕོ་བྱི་བ་ལོ་ (male Fire-Rat); 23 or −358 or −1130

Year 105 BC was a year of the pre-Julian Roman calendar. At the time it was known as the Year of the Consulship of Rufus and Maximus (or, less frequently, year 649 Ab urbe condita) and the Sixth Year of Yuanfeng. The denomination 105 BC for this year has been used since the early medieval period, when the Anno Domini calendar era became the prevalent method in Europe for naming years.

== Events ==
=== By place ===
==== Roman Republic ====
- January 1 (Note: October 2 in the Julian calendar.) – Gnaeus Mallius Maximus and Publius Rutilius Rufus become Roman consuls.
- October 6 – The Battle of Arausio, where the Cimbri destroy two Roman armies on the Rhône, is the most severe defeat of Roman forces since the Battle of Cannae.
- Gaius Marius, together with the consul Publius Rutilius Rufus, initiates sweeping reforms of the Roman army.
- Lucius Cornelius Sulla secures the capture of Jugurtha. His success is made possible by the treachery of Bocchus I, king of Mauretania, and this ends the Jugurthine War (which began in 112 BC).
- At Rome, the first official gladiator match is demonstrated by gladiators from Capua, as part of a training program for the military.

==== Asia ====
- The Han dynasty forms an alliance with the Wusun by marrying a Han princess to their king.
- Wuwei Chanyu of the Xiongnu dies and is succeeded by his youthful son Er Chanyu. That winter heavy snowstorms lead to the deaths of many livestock, and there is discontent with the new ruler, who is regarded as belligerent.

== Births ==
- Decimus Laberius, Roman nobleman and Latin writer (d. 43 BC)
- Tiberius Claudius Nero, Roman politician and general
- Marcus Atius Balbus, Roman praetor and governor (d. 51 BC)

== Deaths ==
- Marcus Aurelius Scaurus, Roman politician and general, executed as a prisoner of war in the advent of the Battle of Arausio
