= Buddhist councils =

Convention of Buddhist monastic sangha

Since the death of the historical Buddha, Siddhartha Gautama, Buddhist monastic communities, the "sangha", have periodically convened for doctrinal and disciplinary reasons and to revise and correct the contents of the Buddhist canons. Although sometimes referred to as Buddhist "councils" (Pāli and Sanskrit: saṅgīti, literally meaning "reciting together" or "joint rehearsal"), Tilakaratne explains that the term saṅgīti stands above all for a group or communal recitation that functions as an expression of communal harmony and unity. This is the key element of the first saṅgīti, for example, for which various prior deliberations formed but a preparation. What the term saṅgīti conveys in this way differs to some extent from what the term “council” designates in its standard English usage.

The famous First Buddhist Council or Communal Recitation is recorded in Buddhist texts as being held soon after the Buddha's passing, when Ananda recited all of the spoken sutras, which were recorded in Rajagriha. The second Council was held 100 years later.

The details of the later councils are debated by modern Buddhist studies. Various sources belonging to different Buddhist schools may contain different accounts of these events. For this reason, modern scholars have questioned the historicity of some of these councils or at least their preserved descriptions in literature.

== First Buddhist council ==
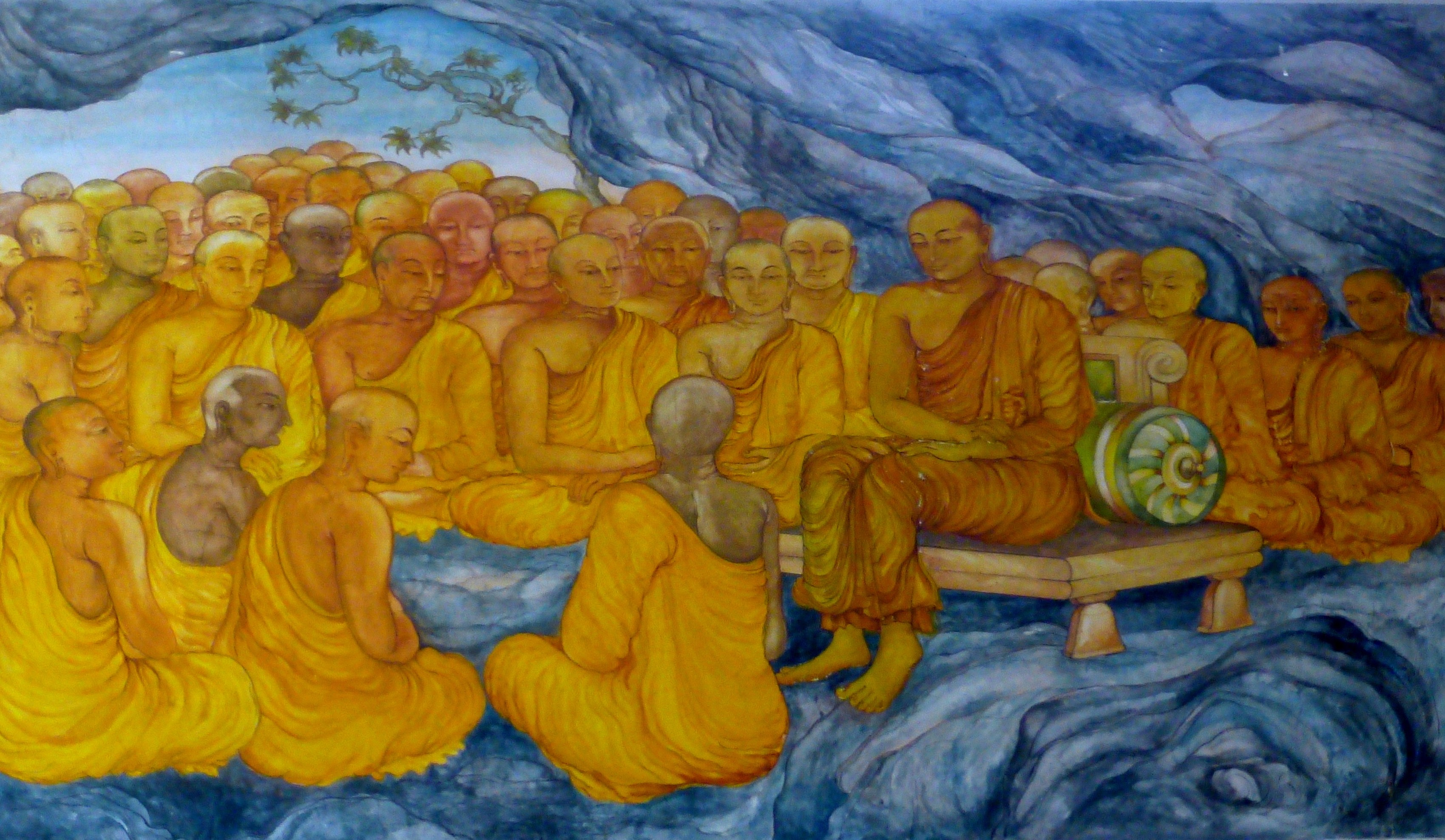
A mural depicting the first Buddhist Council near Rajagaha, Nava. Jetavana temple, Nava Jetavana Park, Shravasti, Uttar Pradesh.

All six of the surviving Vinaya sources of various early Buddhist schools contain accounts, in whole or in part, of the first and second councils. The story of the First Council seems to be a continuation of the story of the Buddha's final days and death told in the Mahāparinibbāna Sutta and its equivalents in the Agamas. Based on correlations and continuity between these two texts, Louis Finot concluded that they had originated from a single narrative that was later split between the Sutta Pitaka and Vinaya Pitaka. In most schools, the account of the First Council is located at the end of the Skandhaka section of the Vinaya but before any appendices.

The first Buddhist council is traditionally said to have been held just after Buddha's final nirvana, and presided over by Mahākāśyapa, one of his most senior disciples, at a cave near Rājagṛha (today's Rajgir) with the support of king Ajatashatru. Its objective was to preserve the Buddha's sayings (suttas) and the monastic discipline or rules (Vinaya). The Suttas were recited by Ananda, and the Vinaya was recited by Upali. Even though the Buddha had said that the Sangha could abolish the minor rules after his passing, the council made the unanimous decision to keep all the rules intact. The traditional notion that the whole of the Suttas and Vinayas as we know them today were recited during this council is likely to be an exaggeration.

It is in fact not clear to whom this traditional notion should be attributed. For example, the Pāli commentarial tradition unambiguously recognizes that the Bakkula Sutta (MN 124) was only included in the Pāli discourse collections at the second saṅgīti. The case is fairly obvious, as the protagonist of this discourse mentions that he has been a monk for eighty years. This obviously exceeds the forty years of the Buddha’s teaching activities, making it inescapable that the discourse could only have been spoken forty years after the Buddha’s funeral, or still later than that. The allocation of this discourse to the second saṅgīti by the Pāli commentaries in this respect shows that the notion that the whole of the suttas as we know them today were recited during the first saṅgīti conflicts with the position adopted by Theravāda exegesis.

Numerous Vinayas depict various disagreements in the first council. Unnamed monks disagreed on whether to keep or get rid of some of the minor rules (since the Buddha had told Ananda that this may be done). Some monks even argued all the minor rules should be abolished. Also, numerous early sources state that Mahakasyapa criticized Ananda in various ways. Bhikkhu Anālayo quotes one passage from a Chinese parallel to the Mahāparinibbāna-sutta (T 1428 at T XXII 966b18), in which Mahākassapa says: "Ānanda is [like] a lay person. I am afraid that, being with covetousness in his mind, he will not recite the discourses completely." Anālayo writes there may have been "actual conflict between two contending factions in the monastic community after the Buddha's decease, with the more ascetically inclined faction emerging as the winning party in the accounts of the first saṅgīti".

According to some traditional accounts, following the Buddha's death, 499 of the Buddha's top arhats were chosen to attend the council. Ananda, then a sotapanna, trained himself until the dawn of day of the council, at which point he attained arahatship and was allowed to join the council.

Regarding the Abhidhamma Pitaka, the third major division of the Tipitaka, modern academic scholarship holds that it was likely composed at a later date because of its contents and differences in language and style. According to Theravada tradition, the Abhidhamma Pitaka, and the ancient Atthakathā (commentary) were also included at the first Buddhist council in the Sutta category, but its literature is different from Sutta because the Abhidhamma Pitaka was authored by Sāriputta.

=== Alternative groups ===
The various Vinayas also recount another curious event during this time. The Cullavagga mentions there was an arhat named Purāṇa who stated that he and his followers preferred to remember the Buddha's teachings in the manner he had heard it and so did not rely on the textual collections of the council. This figure is also found in the Aśokāvadāna and the Tibetan Dulvā Vinaya, which depict Purāṇa and another monk, Gavampati which were not present at the council and who worry about what will happen to the Dharma after the death of the Buddha. This account is described in the Chinese versions of the Dharmagupta and Mahīsāsaka Vinayas and in the Vinayamātrika Sūtra. Gavampati is said to have also maintained a set of eight rules regarding food which are retained by the Mahīsāsaka Vinaya.

A similar event is described by Chinese sources like the writings of the Indian scholar Paramartha, Jizang, and the pilgrim Xuanzang. According to these sources, an alternative canon named the Mahasamghikanikaya (Collection of the Great Assembly) was compiled by an Arhat named Baspa and his followers. Xuanzang reports visiting a stupa near Rajgir which marked the site of this alternate council.

=== Historicity ===
Several modern scholars doubt whether the entire canon was really recited during the First Council, because the early texts contain different accounts on important subjects such as meditation. It may be, though, that early versions were recited of what is now known as the Vinaya-piṭaka and Sutta-piṭaka. Nevertheless, many scholars, from the late 19th century onward, have considered the historicity of the First Council improbable. Some scholars, such as orientalists Louis de La Vallée-Poussin and D.P. Minayeff, thought there must have been assemblies after the Buddha's death, but considered only the main characters and some events before or after the First Council historical. Other scholars, such as Buddhologist André Bareau and Indologist Hermann Oldenberg, considered it likely that the account of the First Council was written after the Second Council, and based on that of the second, since there were not any major problems to solve after the Buddha's death, or any other need to organize the First Council.

On the other hand, archaeologist Louis Finot, Indologist E. E. Obermiller and to some extent Indologist Nalinaksha Dutt thought the account of the First Council was authentic, because of the correspondences between the Pāli texts and the Sanskrit traditions. Indologist Richard Gombrich meanwhile holds that "large parts of the Pali Canon" do date back to the first council.

== Second council and first schism ==
=== Second council ===
The historical records for the Second Buddhist Council derive primarily from the canonical Vinayas of various schools. It was held 100 years after the parinirvana of Buddha in the Valukarama of Vaiśālī and was patronised by the king Kalashoka. While inevitably disagreeing on points of details, these schools nevertheless agree that the bhikkhus at Vaisali were accepting monetary donations and following other lax practices (which led to a controversy when other monks discovered this). The lax practices are often described as "ten points". The main issue though was accepting money from laypersons. These practices were first noticed by a monk named Yasa Kākandakaputta, who alerted other elders and called out the monks. In response, both the monks of Vaiśālī and Yasa gathered senior members of the Sangha from the region to consult in order to fully settle the issue. This dispute about vinaya, according to traditional sources, resulted in the first schism in the Sangha. But some scholars think that a schism did not occur at this time and instead happened at a later date.

=== First Schism ===
==== Vinaya dispute ====
The Cullavagga of the Pali Canon of Theravāda Buddhism holds that the Vaiśālī (Vajjiputtakā) monks practiced ten points (dasa vatthūni) which were against the Vinaya rules.

1. Storing salt in a horn (singilonakappa).
2. Eating food when the shadow of the sun had passed two fingers' breadth beyond noon (duvangulakappa).
3. Eat once and then go again to the village for alms (gāmantarakappa).
4. Holding of the uposatha separately by monks dwelling in the same district (āvāsakappa).
5. Carrying out an official act when the assembly is incomplete (anumatikappa).
6. Following a practice because it is so done by one's tutor or teacher (ācinnakappa).
7. Eating of sour milk by one who has already had his midday meal (amathitakappa).
8. Use of the strong drink before it has fermented (jalogikappa).
9. Use of blankets which have unstitched hem (nisīdanakappa).
10. Accepting of gold and silver (jātarūparajatakappa).

The orthodox monks refused to agree to these points, and one of their leaders, Yasa Kākandakaputta, publicly condemned the action of the Vajjiputtakas. Yasa then left Kosambī, and, having summoned monks from Pāvā in the west and Avanti in the south, sought Sambhūta Sānavāsi in Ahoganga. On his advice they sought Soreyya-Revata, and together they consulted Sabbakāmi at Vālikārāma. In the Council that followed the Ten Points were declared invalid, and this decision was conveyed to the monks. Soon after was held a recital of the Doctrine in which seven hundred monks took part under the leadership of Soreyya-Revata. The recital lasted eight months. The Vajjiputtakas refused to accept the finding of Revata's Council and formed a separate sect, the Mahāsāṃghikas, numbering ten thousand monks, who held a recital of their own. Accordingly, Theravāda Buddhism suggests that Mahāsāṃghikas tried to change the traditional Vinaya by adding the above ten points to it.

However, Mahāsāṃghikas hold that the Sthaviras ("Elders") wanted to 'add' more rules to the Vinaya. Vinaya texts associated with the Sthaviras do contain more rules than those of the Mahāsāṃghika Vinaya. The Mahāsāṃghika Prātimokṣa (list of rules) has 67 rules in the śaikṣa-dharma section, while the Theravāda version has 75 rules. The Mahāsāṃghika Vinaya discusses how the Mahāsāṃghika disagree with the Sthavira 'additions' to the Vinaya (Mahāsāṃghikavinaya, T.1425, p. 493a28-c22.).

The Mahāsāṃghika Śāriputraparipṛcchā contains an account in which an old monk rearranges and augments the traditional Vinaya. As stated in the Śāriputraparipṛcchā:

He copied and rearranged our Vinaya, developing and augmenting what Kāśyapa had codified and which was called "Vinaya of the Great Assembly" (Mahāsāṃghavinaya). [...] The king considered that [the doctrines of the two parties represented] were both the work of the Buddha, and since their preferences were not the same, [the monks of the two camps] should not live together. As those who studied the old Vinaya were in the majority, they were called the Mahāsāṃghika; those who studied the new [Vinaya] were in the minority, but they were all Sthaviras; thus they were named Sthavira.

Due to the conflicting claims from both sects, a clear conclusion cannot be reached on whether the Sthaviras' or the Mahāsāṃghikas' Vinaya was the original Vinaya.

==== The Mahādeva episode and the "five points" ====
The alternative view of what caused the first schism is found in several Sthavira sources including the Theravada Dipavamsa. According to these sources, some 35 years after the second council, there was another meeting in Pāṭaliputra. This was called to dispute five points held by a figure named Mahādeva. The five points generally see arhats as imperfect and fallible. Sthavira sources claim the schism was caused by Mahādeva, who is often depicted as an evil figure (who killed his parents). The "five points" describe an arhat as one still characterized by impurity due to being affected by nocturnal emissions (asucisukhavisaṭṭhi), ignorance (aññāṇa), doubt (kaṅkhā), reaching enlightenment through the guidance of others (paravitāraṇa), and speaking of suffering while in samādhi (vacibheda).

According to the Sthavira accounts, the majority (Mahāsaṃgha) sided with Mahādeva, and a minority of righteous elders (Sthaviras) were opposed to it, thus causing the first schism in the Buddhist community. According to this account, Mahadeva was criticized and opposed by Sthavira elders, and he eventually went on to become the founder of the Mahāsāṃghika school. Mahasamghika sources do not claim Mahadeva as a founder and do not agree with this account. As such, most scholars think that the Mahādeva incident was a later event and that it was not the root cause of the first schism.

Vasumitra's Samayabhedoparacanacakra (a Sarvāstivāda source) claims the dispute in Pāṭaliputra that led to the first schism was over the five heretical points of Mahādeva which degrades the attainment of arhats. These same points are discussed and condemned in the Theravadin Kathavatthu. The later Sarvāstivāda Mahavibhasa develops this story into against the Mahasanghika founder, Mahādeva. According to this version of events, the king ends up supporting the Mahasanghikas. This version of events emphasizes the purity of the Kasmiri Sarvastivadins, who are portrayed as descended from the arahants who fled the persecution of Mahādeva and, led by Upagupta, established themselves in Kashmir and Gandhara.

The Samayabhedoparacanacakra also records a 'Mahādeva' who seems to be a completely different figure who was the founder of the Caitika sect over 200 years later. Some scholars have concluded that an association of "Mahādeva" with the first schism was a later sectarian interpolation based on much later events. Jan Nattier and Charles Prebish argue that the five points of Mahadeva are unlikely to have been the cause of the first schism and see this event as "emerging in a historical period considerably later than previously supposed and taking his place in the sectarian movement by instigating an internal schism within the already existing Mahāsāṃghika school."

=== Legacy ===
It is often considered that Mahāyāna Buddhism was a later offshoot of (one part of) the Mahāsāṃghika.

== Theravada accounts of a third council ==
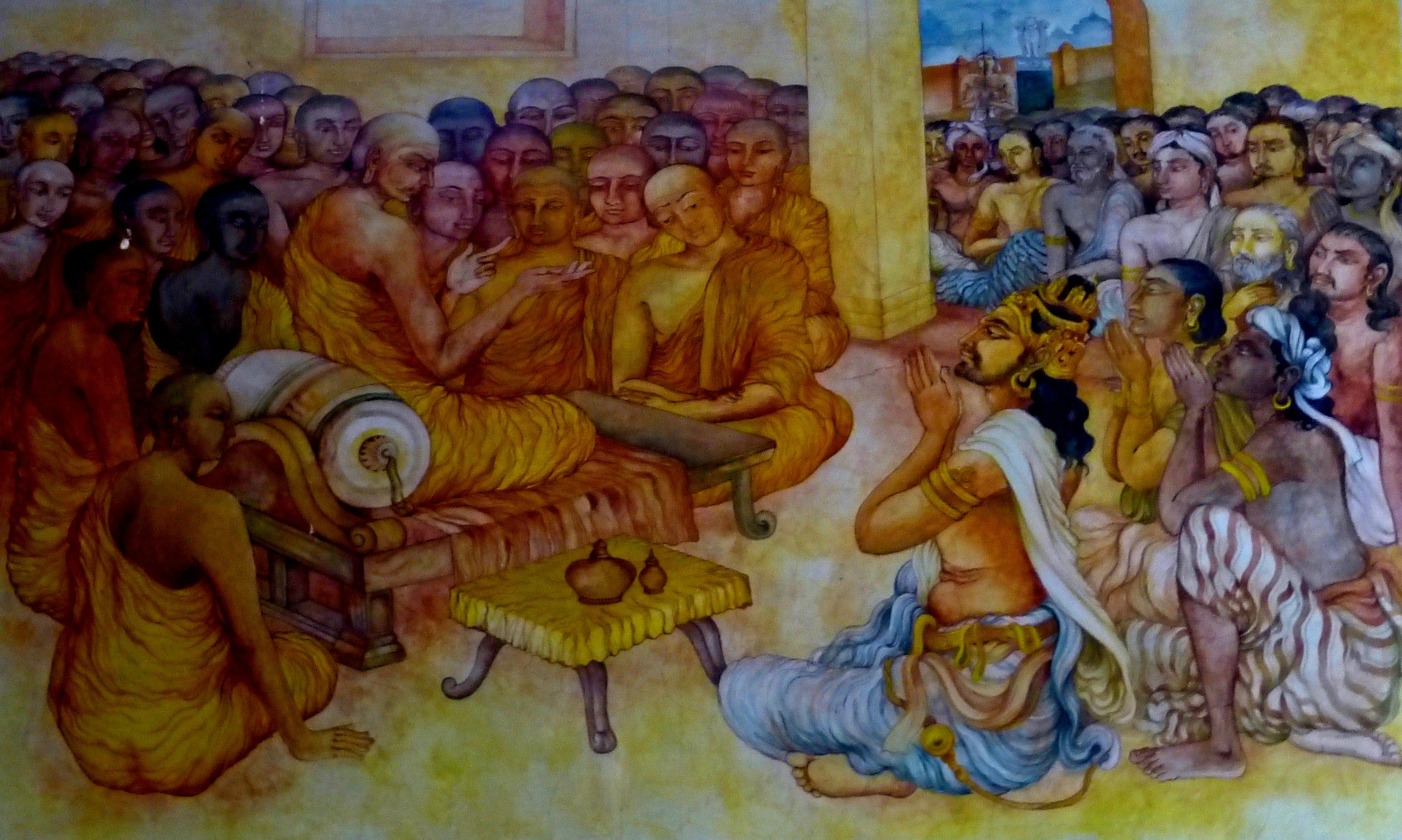
Emperor Asoka and Moggaliputta-Tissa at the Third Buddhist Council, at the Nava Jetavana, Shravasti

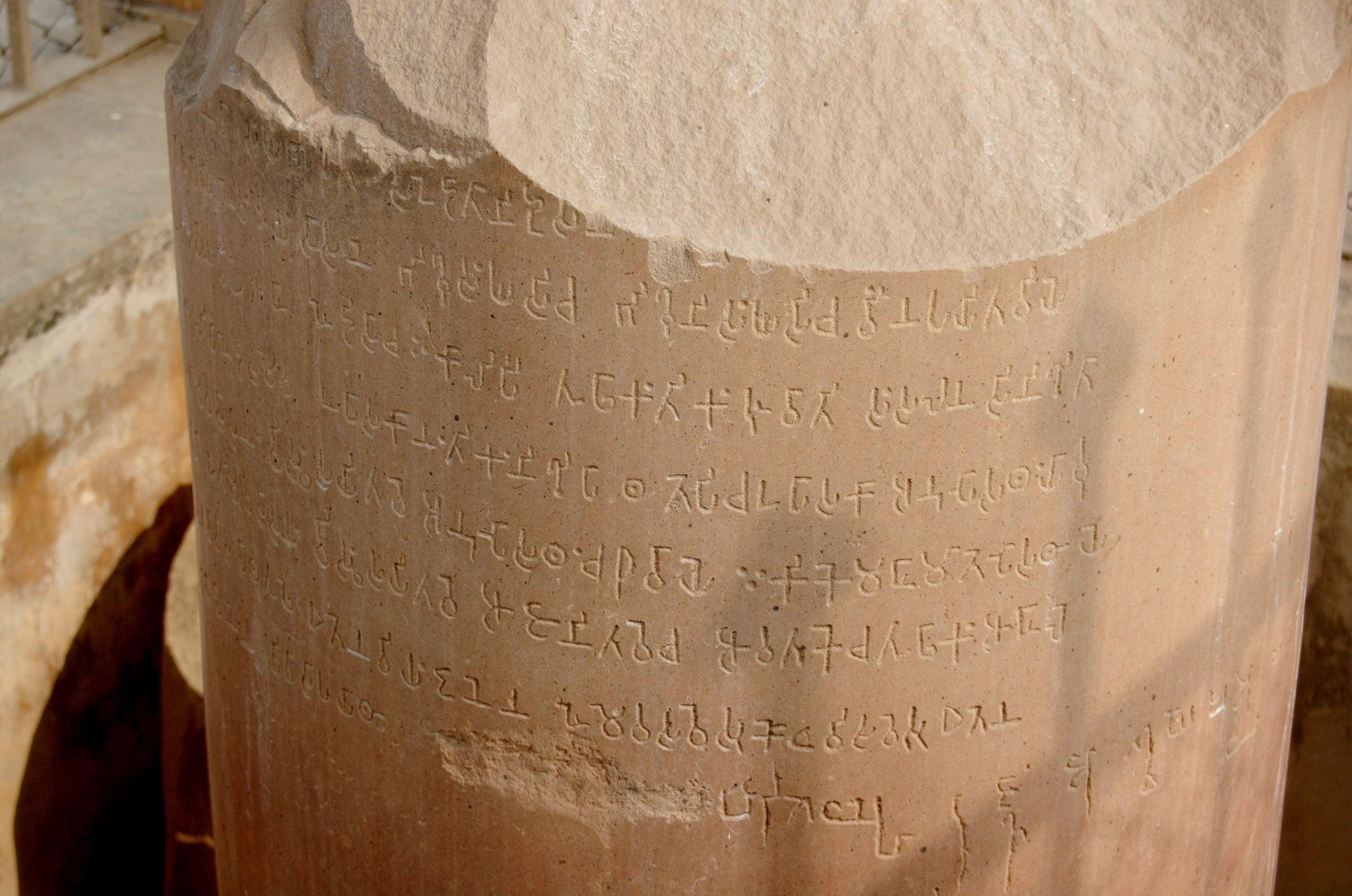
The minor pillar edict of Sarnath discusses divisions in the sangha and how the sangha was unified through the aid of the emperor Ashoka. Three 'Minor Pillar Edicts' (at Sarnath, Sāñchī, and Kosambi) discuss the divisions and unification.

Theravada sources contain narratives of a Third council of the Theravara school which occurred during the reign of Ashoka at Pāṭaliputra, emperor Ashoka's capital.

According to the Theravāda commentaries and chronicles, the Third Buddhist Council was convened by the Mauryan king Ashoka at Pāṭaliputra (today's Patna), under the leadership of the elder Moggaliputta Tissa. Its objective was to purify the Buddhist movement, particularly from opportunistic factions and heretical non-buddhists (tirthikas) which had only joined because they were attracted by the royal patronage of the sangha. Due to the increased royal support of the sangha, large numbers of faithless, greedy men espousing wrong views tried to join the order improperly and caused many divisions in the sangha. Because of this the third council of one thousand monks were convened, led by Moggaliputtatissa. The emperor himself was in attendance and asked the suspect monks what the Buddha taught. They claimed he taught wrong views such as eternalism, etc., which are condemned in the canonical Brahmajala Sutta. He asked the virtuous monks, and they replied that the Buddha was a "Teacher of Analysis" (Vibhajjavādin), an answer that was confirmed by Moggaliputta Tissa.

The Theravadins say that council proceeded to recite the scriptures, adding to the canon Moggaliputta Tissa's own book, the Kathavatthu, a discussion of various dissenting Buddhist views and the Vibhajjavādin responses to them. Only Theravadin sources mention this text. According to this account, this third council also seems to have led to the split between the Sarvastivada and the Vibhajjavāda schools on the issue of the existence of the three times (i.e. temporal eternalism). This doctrine seems to have been defended by a certain Katyayaniputra, who is seen as the founder of Sarvastivada. But according to K.L. Dhammajoti, the Sarvastivada lineage and the Vibhajyavāda lineage of Moggaliputta were already present during the time of Emperor Aśoka.

=== The Ashokan missions ===
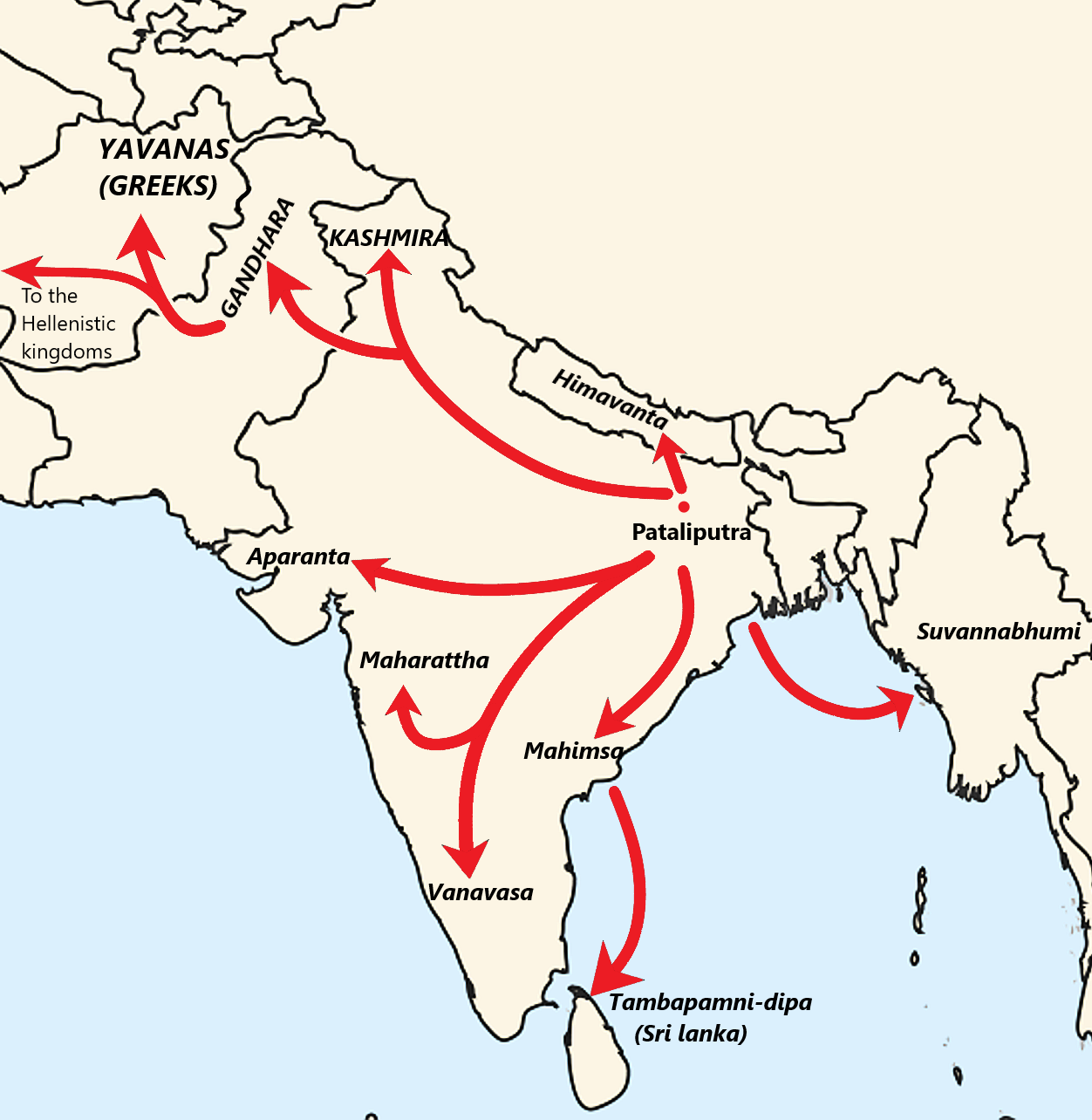
Map of the Buddhist missions during the reign of Ashoka.

Theravada sources mention that another function of this council was to send Buddhist missionaries to various countries in order to spread Buddhism. These reached as far as the Hellenistic kingdoms in the West (in particular the neighboring Greco-Bactrian Kingdom, and possibly even farther according to the inscriptions left on stone pillars by Ashoka). Missionaries were also sent to South India, Sri Lanka and Southeast Asia (possibly to neighboring Burma). The fact that the Buddhist sangha was heavily involved in missionary activities across Asia at the time of Ashoka is well supported by the archeological sources, including numerous Indian inscriptions that match the claims of the Theravada sources.

According to the Mahavamsa (XII, 1st paragraph), the council and Ashoka sent the following missionaries to various regions:

- Elder Majjhantika (Sanskrit: Mahyantika) led the mission to Kashmir and Gandhara
- Elder Mahadeva led the mission to Mahisamandala (Mysore, Karnataka)
- Elder Rakkhita led the mission to Vanavasi (Tamil Nadu)
- The Yona (Greek) elder Dharmaraksita led the mission to Aparantaka ("Western border", consisting of Northern Gujarat, Kathiawar, Kachch and Sindh).
- Elder Mahadharmaraksita led the mission to Maharattha (Maharashtra)
- Maharakkhita (Maharaksita Thera) led the mission to the country of the Yona (Greeks), which likely refers to Greco-Bactria and maybe the Seleucid realm
- Majjhima Thera led the mission to the Himavant area (northern Nepal, the foothills of the Himalayas)
- Sona Thera and Uttara Thera led missions to Suvannabhumi (somewhere in Southeast Asia, possibly Myanmar or Cambodia)
- The elder Mahinda, along with Utthiya, Ittiya, Sambala and Bhaddasala his disciples went to Lankadipa (Sri Lanka)

Some of these missions were very successful, such as the ones which established Buddhism in Afghanistan, Gandhara and Sri Lanka. Gandharan Buddhism, Greco-Buddhism and Sinhalese Buddhism would continue to be major influential traditions for generations after. Regarding the missions to the Mediterranean Hellenistic kingdoms, they seemed to have been less successful. However, some scholars hold that it is possible some Buddhist communities were established for a limited time in Egyptian Alexandria, and this may have been the origin of the so-called Therapeutae sect mentioned by some ancient sources like Philo of Alexandria (c. 20 BCE – 50 CE). Religious scholar Ullrich R. Kleinhempel argues that the most likely candidate for the religion of the Therapeutae is indeed Buddhism.

== The two "fourth councils" ==
By the time of the Fourth Buddhist Councils, Buddhism had splintered into different schools in different regions of India. Scholars have also questioned the historicity of these councils. David Snellgrove considers the Theravada account of the Third Council and the Sarvastivada account of the Fourth Council "equally tendentious". The Milindapanho, a non-canonical Pali Buddhist text, is a dialogue between King Milinda and Venerable Nagasena from the 2nd century B.C.

=== Sinhalese Theravāda Council (Fourth Theravāda Council) ===
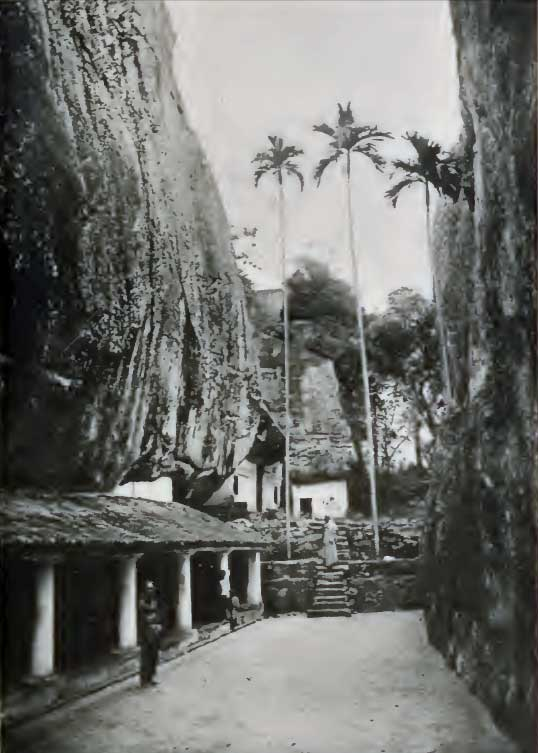
Aluvihara Temple in Matale, where the Fourth Theravāda Buddhist Council was held (1896)

The Southern Theravāda school had a Fourth Buddhist Council in the first century BCE in Sri Lanka at Alu Vihāra (Aloka Leṇa) during the time of King Vattagamani-Abhaya also known as Valagamba. According to K. R. Norman there is a major discrepancy between the sources which cite the death of Valagamba of Anuradhapura as occurring in 77 BCE and his supposed patronization of the effort to commit the Buddhist oral traditions to writing in the period 29 to 17 BCE. Norman writes:

The Dipavamsa states that during the reign of Valagamba (Vattagamani Abhaya) (29–17 BCE) the monks who had previously remembered the Tipitaka and its commentary orally, wrote them down in books, because of the threat posed by famine and war. The Mahavamsa also refers briefly to the writing down of the canon and the commentaries at this time.

Valagamba is also associated with patronizing the site of Abhayagiri, building the stupa there and offering it to Kuppikala Mahatissa thero. This seems to have caused a dispute between Abhayagiri and the monks of the Mahavihara monastery (the ancient Theravada lineage).

Whatever the case, the sources state that a council was held at the cave temple of Alu Vihāra in response to Beminitiya Seya. Because at this time the Pali texts were strictly an oral literature maintained in several recensions by dhammabhāṇakas (dharma reciters), the surviving monks recognized the danger of not writing it down so that even if some of the monks whose duty it was to study and remember parts of the Canon for later generations died, the teachings would not be lost.

=== Kashmiri Sarvāstivāda Council ===
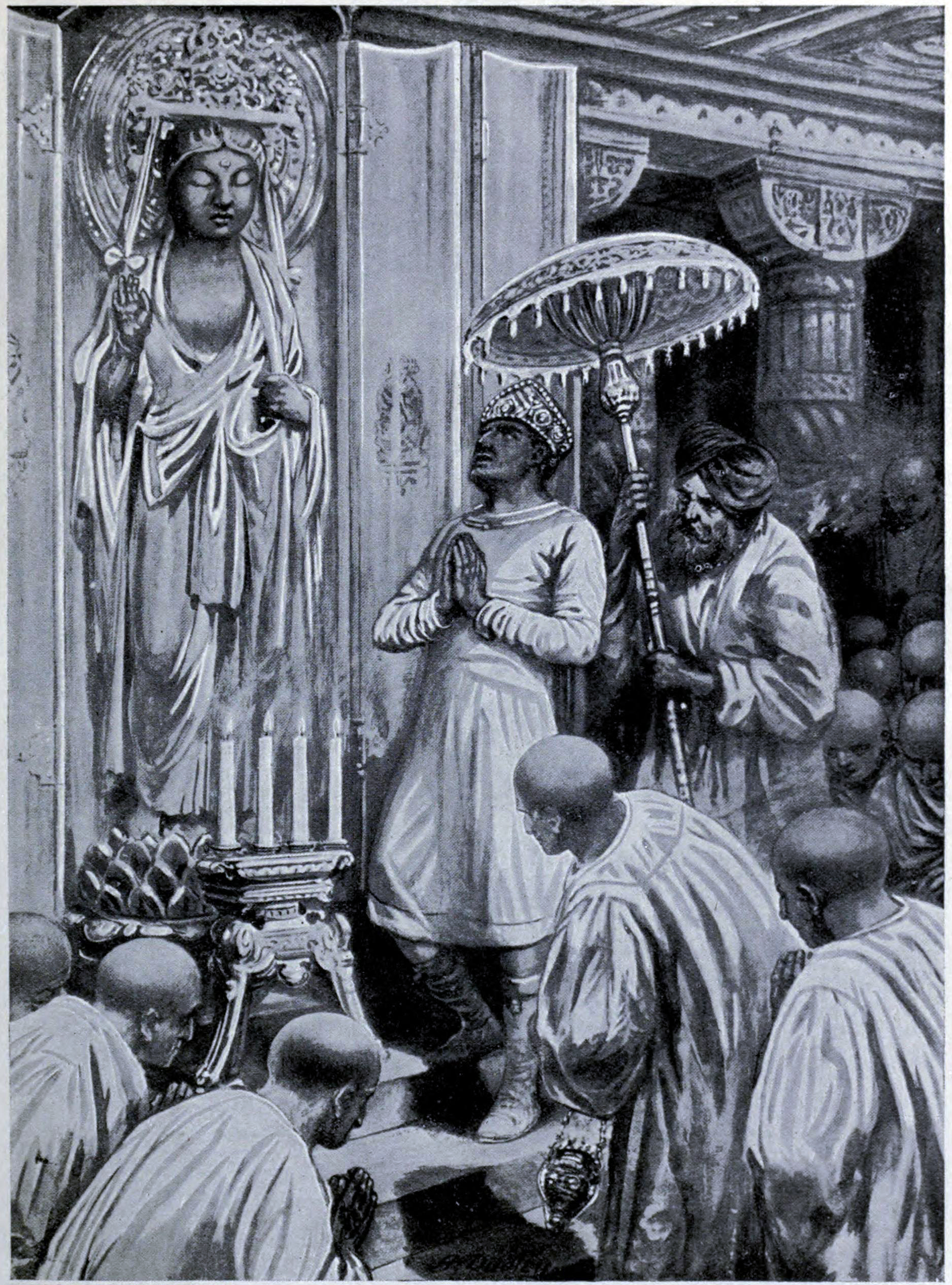
Emperor Kanishka I

Another Fourth Buddhist Council was held by the Sarvastivada tradition in the Kushan empire, and is said to have been convened by the Kushan emperor Kanishka I at Kundalvana vihara (Kundalban) in Kashmir. The exact location of the vihara is presumed to be around Harwan, near Srinagar. An alternate theory places its location in the Kuvana monastery in Jalandhar, though this is improbable.

The 4th Buddhist Council was convened by Kanishka, troubled by conflicting doctrines among various sects. He advised with the venerable Pársva, who organized a general assembly of theologians in Kundalabana near Srinagar, Kashmir. All 500 members were from the Sarvastivada School. Vasumitra was elected president, and Asvaghoṣa vice-president. They examined ancient theological literature and created detailed commentaries on the Canon's three main divisions. After the council, these commentaries were inscribed on copper sheets and stored in a stupa built by Kanishka. Kanishka then renewed Asoka's donation of Kashmir to the church before returning home via the Baramula Pass.

The Fourth Council of Kashmir is not recognized as authoritative for the Theravadins. Reports of this council can be found in scriptures which were kept in the Mahayana tradition. It is said that emperor Kanishka gathered five hundred Bhikkhus in Kashmir, headed by Vasumitra, to systematize the Sarvastivadin canon, which were translated from earlier Prakrit vernacular languages (such as Gandhari) into Sanskrit. It is said that during the council three hundred thousand verses and over nine million statements were compiled, a process which took twelve years to complete. Sarvastivada sources also claim that the encyclopedic Abhidharma Mahāvibhāṣā Śāstra ("Great Abhidharma Commentary") dates to the time of Kanishka. This massive text became the central text of the Vaibhāṣika tradition in Kashmir. Although the Sarvastivada are no longer extant as an independent school, its Abhidharma tradition were inherited by the Mahayana tradition.

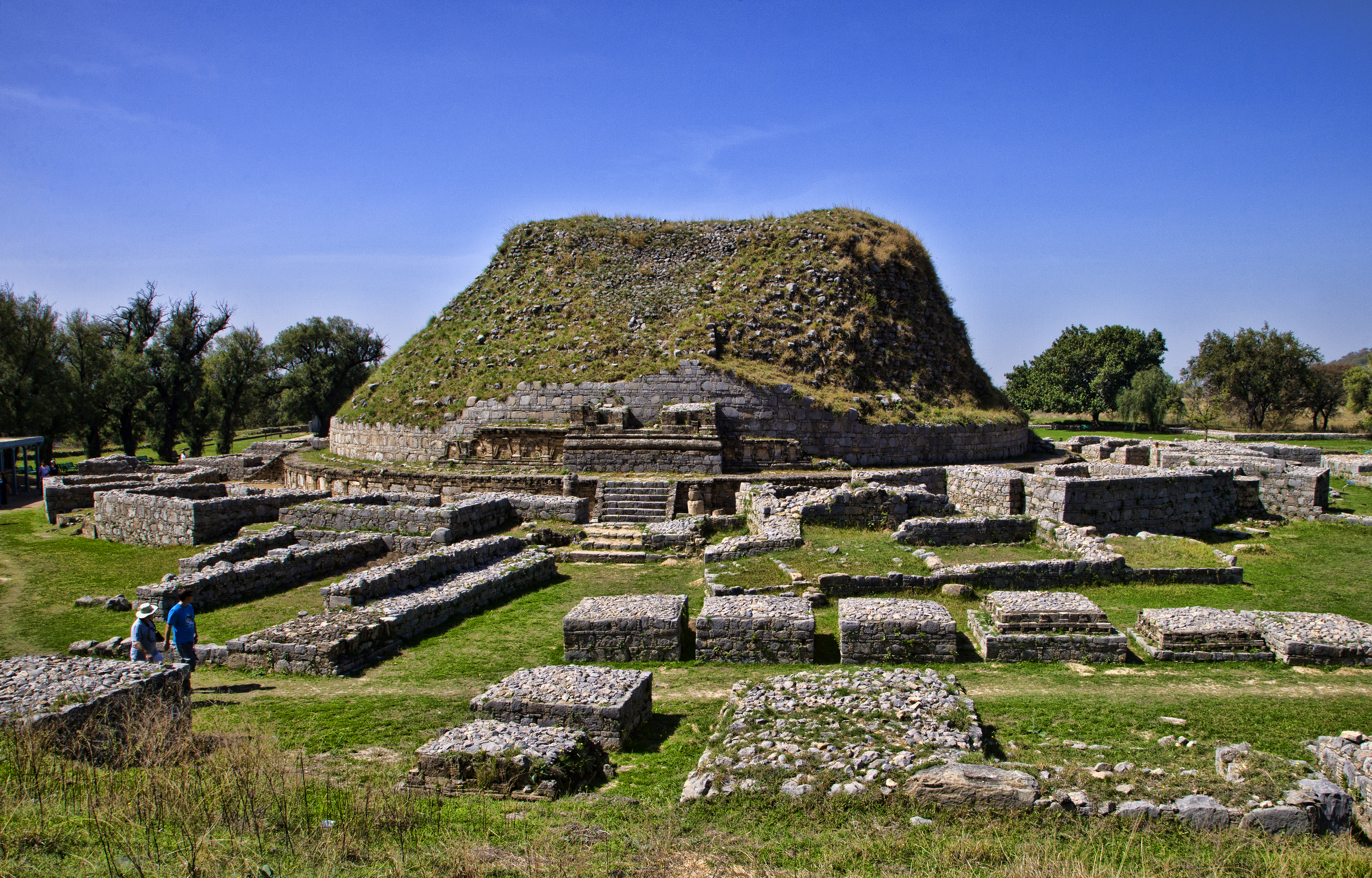
The Dharmarajika Stupa and monastery ruins, a major Buddhist site in Taxila, one of the capitals of the Kushan empire

The new Vaibhāṣika texts were not accepted by all Sarvāstivādins. Some "Western masters" from Gandhara and Bactria had divergent views which disagreed with the new orthodoxy. These disagreements from the "Sautrantikas" can be seen in later works, such as the *Tattvasiddhi-Śāstra (成實論), the *Abhidharmahṛdaya (T no. 1550), and the Abhidharmakośakārikā of Vasubandhu.

== Theravada Councils in Myanmar ==
=== Fifth Buddhist Council (1871) ===
Another Buddhist Council, this time presided by Theravada monks, took place in Mandalay, Burma, in 1871 in the reign of King Mindon. In the Burmese tradition, it is commonly known as the "Fifth Council". The chief objective of this meeting was to recite all the teachings of the Buddha and examine them in minute detail to see if any of them had been altered, distorted or dropped.

It was presided over by three Elders, the Venerable Mahathera Jagarabhivamsa, the Venerable Narindabhidhaja, and the Venerable Mahathera Sumangalasami in the company of some two thousand four hundred monks (2,400). The Venerable Ledi Sayadaw, a pivotal Burmese monk, was responsible for the translation of the Kathāvatthu (Pali text) during the Fifth Buddhist Council. According to Pho Hlaing (Yaw Min Gyi), the wise minister of the Yadanarbon era, the monk Ashin Ñāṇadhaja (Ledi Sayadaw's ordination name) successfully completed the translation of the Kathāvatthu and its commentary (Kathāvatthu-aṭṭhakathā) while seated upon the royal throne in the Byè-taik (the inner court or royal treasury). At this council, Bhikkhu Ñāṇadhaja helped in the editing and translating of the Abhidhamma texts.

Their joint Dhamma recitation lasted for five months. It was also the work of this council to approve the entire Tripitaka inscribed for posterity on seven hundred and twenty-nine marble slabs in the Burmese script before its recitation. This monumental task was done by the monks and many skilled craftsmen who upon completion of each slab had them housed in beautiful miniature 'pitaka' pagodas on a special site in the grounds of King Mindon's Kuthodaw Pagoda at the foot of Mandalay Hill where it and the so-called Tripiṭaka tablets at Kuthodaw Pagoda stand.

"Kuthodaw Pagoda" holds the title of the 'World’s Largest Book,' featuring stone tablets inscribed with the Tipitaka, the Pali canon of Theravada Buddhism. Construction began in 1860, resulting in an extraordinary collection of 729 marble tablets inscribed with the Tipitaka Pali canon of Theravada Buddhism, accompanied by a 730th tablet detailing the project's history. Each stone tablet, standing approximately 1.5 meters (5 feet) tall, 3.5 feet wide, and 13 centimeters (5 inches) thick, was originally adorned with gold lettering, enhancing its divine presence.

Maha Lawkamarazein or Kuthodaw Inscription Shrines, the Stone Inscription is a collection of 729 stone slabs on which are inscribed the whole of the Buddhist scriptures whose religious and social significance is important to the world. It records the Fifth Great Synod convened by King Mindon and which was the significant event of the Buddhist religion and its devotees. In 2013, The United Nations Educational, Scientific and Cultural Organization UNESCO added the Kuthodaw Inscription Shrines (also known as the Maha Lawkamarazein) at Kuthodaw Pagoda to the Memory of the World International Register.

The 730 marble tablets at Kuthodaw Pagoda represent a monumental achievement in the preservation of the Pali Canon. Commissioned by King Mindon during the Fifth Buddhist Council in 1871, these marble slabs were meticulously inscribed to ensure the Tipitaka remained incorruptible by time or nature. Because of their unparalleled accuracy and permanence, they served as the primary official reference for the scholars of the Sixth Buddhist Council (1954–1956) in Yangon, anchoring the modern version of the Theravada scriptures in a solid, lithic tradition.

The Sixth Buddhist Council (1954–1956) held in Yangon to commemorate the 2,500th anniversary of the Buddha’s Parinirvana, this international council used the Fifth Council's stone inscriptions as a primary official reference. Thousands of monks from various Theravada nations cross-checked the stone texts against other regional versions to produce a definitive, purified edition of the Pali Canon.

=== Sixth Buddhist Council (1954) ===
The Sixth Buddhist Council (Pali–Chaṭṭha Saṅgāyana) was called at Kaba Aye in Yangon (formerly Rangoon) in 1954, 83 years after the fifth one was held in Mandalay. It was sponsored by the Burmese Government led by the then Prime Minister Nu. He authorized the construction of the Maha Passana Guha, the "great cave", an artificial cave very much like India's Sattapanni Cave where the first Buddhist Council had been held. Upon its completion The Council met on 17 May 1954.

As in the case of the preceding councils, its first objective was to affirm and preserve the genuine Dhamma and Vinaya. However it was unique insofar as the monks who took part in it came from eight countries. These two thousand five hundred learned Theravada monks came from Myanmar, Thailand, Cambodia, Laos, Vietnam, Sri Lanka, India, and Nepal. Notable participants included representatives from China, Indonesia, Germany and the Chittagong Buddhist Association (from East Pakistan, now Bangladesh). Also in attendance were the Bengali Buddhist Association from India, delegates from Malaya (modern-day Malaysia), and humanitarian and Buddhist representatives from the United States.

Germany can only be counted as the nationality of the only two western monks in attendance: Nyanatiloka Mahathera and Nyanaponika Thera. They both were invited from Sri Lanka. Mahasi Sayadaw was appointed the task of asking the required questions about the Dhamma of Bhadanta Vicittasarabhivamsa who answered all of them in a way that was judged to be learned and satisfactory. By the time this council met, all the participating countries had had the Pali Tripiṭaka rendered into their native scripts, with the exception of India.

The traditional recitation of the Buddhist Scriptures took two years, and the Tripiṭaka and its allied literature in all the scripts were painstakingly examined and their differences noted down and the necessary corrections made and all the versions were then collated. It was found that there was not much difference in the content of any of the texts. Finally, after the council had officially approved them, all of the books of the Tipitaka and their commentaries were prepared for printing on modern presses and published in the Burmese script. The effort involved the two thousand five hundred monks and numerous lay people. Their work came to an end on the evening of Vesak, 24 May 1956, exactly two and a half millennia after Buddha's Parinibbana, according to the traditional Theravada dating.

Following the Sixth Council, Myanmar became a major source of international Vipassana meditation movements (notably through Mahasi Sayadaw) that spread to the world. The most prestigious religious recognition went to Mingun Sayadaw, who was officially recognized as the first "Bearer of the Three Pitakas" for reciting all 16,000 pages of the canon from memory. In 1985, the Guinness World Records recorded Mingun Sayadaw as a record holder in the Human memory category.

Prominent political figures in attendance included King Bhumibol Adulyadej and Prime Minister Field Marshal Plaek Phibunsongkhram of Thailand; King Norodom Sihanouk and Prime Minister Penn Nouth of Cambodia; Crown Prince Savang Vatthana and the Prime Minister of Laos; as well as ministerial representatives from Ceylon. During this diplomatic assembly, the University of Rangoon conferred an honorary doctorate upon King Sihanouk. Concurrently, the Burmese government bestowed the Order of Agga Maha Thiri Thudhamma—the highest national honor—upon both King Bhumibol and Prime Minister Phibunsongkhram of Thailand.

In addition to the physical presence of international scholars and organizational delegates, the Council received high-level diplomatic support. Formal messages of commendation were sent by world leaders, including Indian Prime Minister Jawaharlal Nehru, the Prime Minister of Sikkim, the King and Prime Minister of Nepal, the Prime Minister of Japan, and the Government of the Ryukyu Islands. Notably, a message from Queen Elizabeth II was delivered and read by the British Ambassador to Burma, Lord Paul Gore-Booth, Baron Gore-Booth.

The Sixth Buddhist Council (Chaṭṭha Saṅgāyana), held from 1954 to 1956 in Yangon, Myanmar, represented a landmark event in modern Theravada history. Convened to coincide with the 2,500th anniversary of the Buddha's Parinibbāna, its primary objective was the systematic purification and standardization of the Pali Canon (Tipitaka).

The most significant academic achievement of the Council was the production of the Chaṭṭha Saṅgāyana edition of the Buddhist scriptures. Over 2,500 monks from various Theravada nations—including Sri Lanka, Thailand, Laos, and Cambodia—rigorously cross-referenced the Burmese texts against international versions and ancient palm-leaf manuscripts. This process eliminated centuries of scribal errors and inconsistencies, resulting in an authoritative 40-volume set of the Tipitaka, complemented by its commentaries (Atthakatha) and sub-commentaries (Tika).

This council's work was the achievement of representatives from the entire Buddhist world. The version of the Tipitaka which it undertook to produce has been recognized as being true to the pristine teachings of the Buddha and the authoritative rendering of them to date. The Council served as a catalyst for transnational Buddhist unity. By inviting high-ranking monks and scholars, it bridged regional doctrinal gaps and fostered a collective identity among Theravada practitioners.

== Theravada Councils in the Thai tradition ==
The Thai Theravada tradition has a different way of counting the history of Buddhist councils and names many other councils besides the ones listed above. A common Thai historical source for the early councils is the Saṅgītiyavaṁsa (c. 1789) by Somdet Wannarat, abbot of Wat Pho.

The first three councils are the traditional councils in India (1. Rājagaha, 2. Vesālī, 3. Pāṭaliputra).

The fourth council is seen by the Thai tradition of Buddhist history as having taken place under the reign of King Devānampiyatissa (247–207 BCE), when Buddhism was first brought to Sri Lanka. It was supposed to have been held under the presidency of the Venerable Ariṭṭha, the first pupil of the Elder Mahinda. This is not usually counted as a council in other traditions, but the Samantapāsādikā does mention a recital at this time.

The fifth council is that of King Vattagāmanī Abhaya, when the Pali Canon was first put into writing in Sri Lanka in the first century BCE at Āluvihāra under the presidency of Mahātthera Rakkhita. This is the same event that other Theravāda traditions refer to as the Fourth Theravāda Council, which has already been discussed above.

The sixth council, according to the Saṅgītiyavaṁsa, comprises the activities of the Pāli translation of the Sinhalese commentaries, a project that was led by Ācariya Buddhaghosa and involved numerous bhikkhus of the Sri Lankan Mahavihara tradition.

The seventh council is believed to have taken place during the time of the Sri Lankan king Parākkamabāhu I and presided over by Kassapa Thera in 1176. During this council the Atthavaṇṇanā was written, which explains the Pāli translation by Buddhaghosa of the original Sinhalese commentaries. Parākkamabāhu also unified the Sri Lankan sangha into one single Theravada community.

=== Councils held in Thailand ===
From this point onwards, the Thai tradition focuses on councils held in Thailand which were patronized by the Thai monarchy.

The first of these was held in the Mahābodhārāma at Chiang Mai, which was attended by several monks. The Mahāthera Dhammadinnā of Tālavana Mahāvihāra (Wat Pā Tān) presided over the council, which was patronized by the King of Lan Na, Tilokaraj (r. 1441–1487). During this council, the orthography of the Thai Pali Canon was corrected and it was rendered into the Lan Na script. This council was held in 1477 CE.

A second Thai council was held in Bangkok from November 13, 1788, to April 10, 1789, under the aegis of King Rāma I and his brother. It was attended by 250 monks and scholars. A new edition of the Pali Canon was published, the Tipitaka Chabab Tongyai.

The third Thai council was held in 1878 during the reign of King Chulalongkorn (Rama V). During this council, the Thai script was used to make copies of the Pali Canon (instead of a modified Khmer script) and the canon was published in modern book form for the first time.

The next Thai council was held in Bangkok during the reign of Rama VII (1925–1935). This council saw a new edition of the Pali Canon published in the Thai script which was distributed throughout the country.

== See also ==
- Dhamma Society Fund
- Folding-book manuscripts
- Index of Buddhism-related articles
- Pali Text Society
- Palm-leaf manuscripts
- Tripiṭaka tablets at Kuthodaw Pagoda
- World Fellowship of Buddhists
