= 117 BC =

117 BC in various calendars
- Gregorian calendar: 117 BC; CXVII BC
- Ab urbe condita: 637
- Ancient Egypt era: XXXIII dynasty, 207
- Pharaoh: Ptolemy VIII Physcon, 29
- Ancient Greek Olympiad (summer): 165th Olympiad, year 4
- Assyrian calendar: 4634
- Balinese saka calendar: N/A
- Bengali calendar: −710 – −709
- Berber calendar: 834
- Buddhist calendar: 428
- Burmese calendar: −754
- Byzantine calendar: 5392–5393
- Chinese calendar: 癸亥年 (Water Pig); 2581 or 2374 — to — 甲子年 (Wood Rat); 2582 or 2375
- Coptic calendar: −400 – −399
- Discordian calendar: 1050
- Ethiopian calendar: −124 – −123
- Hebrew calendar: 3644–3645
- Hindu calendars
- Vikram Samvat: −60 – −59
- Shaka Samvat: N/A
- Kali Yuga: 2984–2985
- Holocene calendar: 9884
- Iranian calendar: 738 BP – 737 BP
- Islamic calendar: 761 BH – 760 BH
- Javanese calendar: N/A
- Julian calendar: N/A
- Korean calendar: 2217
- Minguo calendar: 2028 before ROC 民前2028年
- Nanakshahi calendar: −1584
- Seleucid era: 195/196 AG
- Thai solar calendar: 426–427
- Tibetan calendar: ཆུ་མོ་ཕག་ལོ་ (female Water-Boar); 10 or −371 or −1143 — to — ཤིང་ཕོ་བྱི་བ་ལོ་ (male Wood-Rat); 11 or −370 or −1142

Year 117 BC was a year of the pre-Julian Roman calendar. At the time it was known as the Year of the Consulship of Diadematus and Augur (or, less frequently, year 637 Ab urbe condita) and the Sixth Year of Yuanshou. The denomination 117 BC for this year has been used since the early medieval period, when the Anno Domini calendar era became the prevalent method in Europe for naming years.

== Events ==
- Quintus Marcius Rex triumphs over the Stoeni tribe of northern Italy.

== Births ==
- Ptolemy XII Auletes, king (pharaoh) of Egypt (d. 51 BC)

== Deaths ==
- Huo Qubing, Chinese general of the Han dynasty (b. 140 BC)
- Sima Xiangru, Chinese statesman, poet, and musician (b. 179 BC)
