= Lin Jue =

19th-century Chinese painter and calligrapher

Lin Jue (林覺, c. 1786-1858) was a Chinese ink painter and calligrapher active 1800-1860. His birthplace is unclear, with some sources suggesting he was born in Taiwan while others suggest Fujian's Quanzhou.

== Introduction ==
Lin Jue was a Qing dynasty ink painter active in Taiwan's Tainan, Chiayi, and Hsinchu regions around 1800 to around 1860. He was skilled in painting flowers and birds, figures, landscapes, and animals. His calligraphy and painting style were similar to Huang Shen (黃慎), one of the Eight Eccentrics of Yangzhou (揚州八怪), and his artistic approach was considered to have a "Fujian style" by scholars. Lin Jue's bird paintings frequently depict Chinese starlings, teals, and magpies, while his figure paintings depict folk life scenes, such as cow herding and fishing, as well as folk stories. According to the "Da Dong Collection of Calligraphy and Painting(大東書畫集)," Lin Jue was proficient in using a blunt brush and dried sugarcane fibers for painting in his later years. Lin Jue also painted temple murals, but due to human and natural factors, as well as repairs and renovations over the years, they no longer exist. Only a few paper-based ink paintings signed with the name "Lingzi(鈴子)," "Lingzi Jue(鈴子覺)," or "Lingzi Lin Jue(鈴子林覺)" have survived to this day.
