= 140 BC =

140 BC in various calendars
Gregorian calendar	140 BC; CXL BC
Ab urbe condita	614
Ancient Egypt era	XXXIII dynasty, 184
Pharaoh	Ptolemy VIII Physcon, 6
Ancient Greek Olympiad (summer)	160th Olympiad (victor)¹
Assyrian calendar	4611
Balinese saka calendar	N/A
Bengali calendar	−733 – −732
Berber calendar	811
Buddhist calendar	405
Burmese calendar	−777
Byzantine calendar	5369–5370
Chinese calendar	庚子年 (Metal Rat); 2558 or 2351 — to — 辛丑年 (Metal Ox); 2559 or 2352
Coptic calendar	−423 – −422
Discordian calendar	1027
Ethiopian calendar	−147 – −146
Hebrew calendar	3621–3622
- Hindu calendars
Vikram Samvat	−83 – −82
Shaka Samvat	N/A
Kali Yuga	2961–2962
Holocene calendar	9861
Iranian calendar	761 BP – 760 BP
Islamic calendar	784 BH – 783 BH
Javanese calendar	N/A
Julian calendar	N/A
Korean calendar	2194
Minguo calendar	2051 before ROC 民前2051年
Nanakshahi calendar	−1607
Seleucid era	172/173 AG
Thai solar calendar	403–404
Tibetan calendar	ལྕགས་ཕོ་བྱི་བ་ལོ་ (male Iron-Rat) −13 or −394 or −1166 — to — ལྕགས་མོ་གླང་ལོ་ (female Iron-Ox) −12 or −393 or −1165

140 BC was a year of the pre-Julian Roman calendar. At the time it was known as the Year of the Consulship of Sapiens and Caepio (or, less frequently, year 614 Ab urbe condita) and the First Year of Jianyuan. The denomination 140 BC for this year has been used since the early medieval period, when the Anno Domini calendar era became the prevalent method in Europe for naming years.

== Events ==
=== By place ===
==== Africa ====
- Scipio Aemilianus leads a group of Roman ambassadors to Alexandria, where they meet with King Ptolemy VIII.

==== Judea ====
- Simon Maccabaeus crowned king of Judea.

== Births ==
- Huo Qubing, Chinese general of the Han dynasty (d. 117 BC)
- Lucius Licinius Crassus, Roman consul and statesman (d. 91 BC)
- Su Wu, Chinese diplomat and statesman (d. 60 BC)
- Tigranes the Great, king of Armenia (d. 55 BC)
