= Xulihu =

Chanyu of the Xiongnu Empire

- Xulihu Chanyu
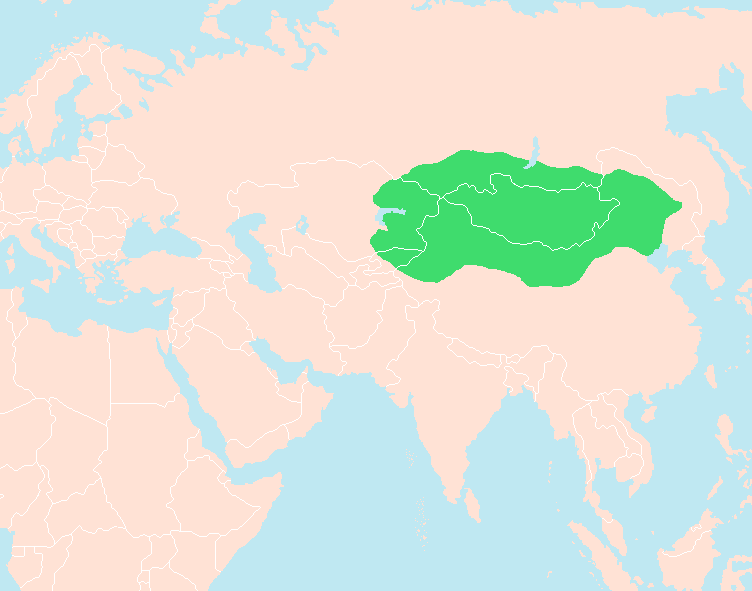
- Domain and influence of the Xiongnu
- Reign: c. 102–101 BC
- Predecessor: Er Chanyu
- Successor: Chedihou Chanyu
- Dynasty: Modu Chanyu
- Father: Yizhixie Chanyu

Xulihu Chanyu (Chinese: 呴犁湖; r. 102–101 BC) was a ruler of the Xiongnu Empire. Xulihu Chanyu was the younger brother of Wuwei Chanyu. He succeeded his nephew Er Chanyu in 102 BC.

In 101 BC, the Xiongnu raided Dingxiang, Yunzhong, Zhangye, and Jiuquan.

Xulihu died in 101 BC and was succeeded by his younger brother Chedihou Chanyu.

== Footnotes ==
Preceded by Er Chanyu	Chanyu of the Xiongnu Empire; 102–100 BC	Succeeded by Qiedihou
