= Valagamba =

Valagamba වට්ඨ ගාමණී අභය වලගම්බා

King of Anuradhapura
- Reign: 103 BC and c. 89–77 BC
- Predecessor: Khallata Naga; Dathika
- Successor: Mahakuli Mahatissa
- Died: 77 BC
- Consort: Queen Consort; Anuladevi Royal Consort; Somadevi
- Issue: Chora Naga
Names
- Wattagamani Abhaya; Walagam Abha; Walagambahu
- House: House of Vijaya
- Father: Saddhatissa
- Religion: Theravāda Buddhism

Valagamba (Sinhala: වට්ඨ ගාමණී අභය, වලගම්බා), also known (in Pāli) as Vaṭṭagāmiṇi Abhaya and Valagam Abha. Valagamba was a king of the Anuradhapura Kingdom of Sri Lanka. Five months after becoming king, he was overthrown by a rebellion and an invasion from South India, but regained the throne by defeating the invaders fourteen years later. He is also known for the construction of the Abhayagiri Dagaba and Aluthepola Ganekanda Raja Maha Vihara.

== Accession to the throne ==
Valagamba was the fourth son of King Saddha Tissa, the brother of Dutugamunu. His three elder brothers, Thulatthana, Lanja Tissa and Khallata Naga, ruled the country before him. A general of the army named Kammaharattaka (Maharattaka) killed Khallata Naga and seized power. Valagamba in turn killed Kammaharattaka and took over the throne in 103 BC.

He adopted Mahaculika, the son of Khallatanaga, as his own son, and took Anuladevi, Mahaculika's mother, as his queen. He also had another queen named Somadevi.

== Rebellion, invasion and famine ==
Five months after his coronation as king, a Brahmin in Rohana named Tissa rebelled against him. At the same time, an invading army from South India, led by seven Tamil leaders, landed in Mahatittha. Tissa and the seven Tamil leaders all sent messages to Valagamba, telling him to hand over power to them. Vattha gamani then sent a message to the Tissa Brahmin, saying that he did not care about the power and that Tissa could take the throne if he dared, but only if he defeated the invading army.

Accepting this challenge, Tissa tried to fight but was defeated by the Tamils. After this, the seven Tamil leaders waged war against Valagamba and defeated him in a battle at Kolambalaka. While the king was fleeing in a chariot, a nirgrantha (Jain) named Giri saw him and is said to have kept shouting, "The great black lion is fleeing!" Valagamba resolved to build a temple there and later built the Abhayagiriya after he regained the throne.

When the pursuers were gaining on them, Queen Somadevi jumped down from the chariot to lighten it and give the king a chance to escape, and was captured. The Pathra Dhatu (the sacred bowl relic of the Buddha) was also taken to India. The five Dravidians, namely Pulahatta, Bahiya, Panya Mara, Pilaya Mara, and Dathiya, ruled Anuradhapura for 14 years, although they fell out with each other, with each of the five rulers being killed by his successor.

Valagamba fled to Malayarata for safety and was helped by a monk named Kumbhilaka Mahatissa while he was in hiding. The king organized a large army to attack Anuradhapura and defeat the invading army. However, a rift between him and his ministers resulted in them leaving him, thus weakening the army. However, the Sangha brought about a reconciliation, and Valagamba resumed his preparations for attacking Anuradhapura.

There was a huge drought called the Beminitiya Seya (Brahmana Thiya Sagatha), which had a devastating impact on Sri Lanka. Humanity in Sri Lanka was pushed to the brink of collapse due to this drought. According to early sages, the people in the country were reduced to mere skeletons and skin. Plagues began to spread as corpses piled up, and various diseases transmitted across the country. Due to the anarchy, the country descended into chaos, and it seemed as though human existence had been forgotten. Buddhism had reached a low point due to the intrusions and the death of monks.

== Regaining power ==
Around 89 BC, Valagamba regained the throne after defeating Dathiya, the last of the invading Tamil leaders, and ruled the country for twelve years until his death in 77 BC. He sent for Somadevi and restored her as queen, and built a temple named Somarama or Somawati in her honour.

== Services ==
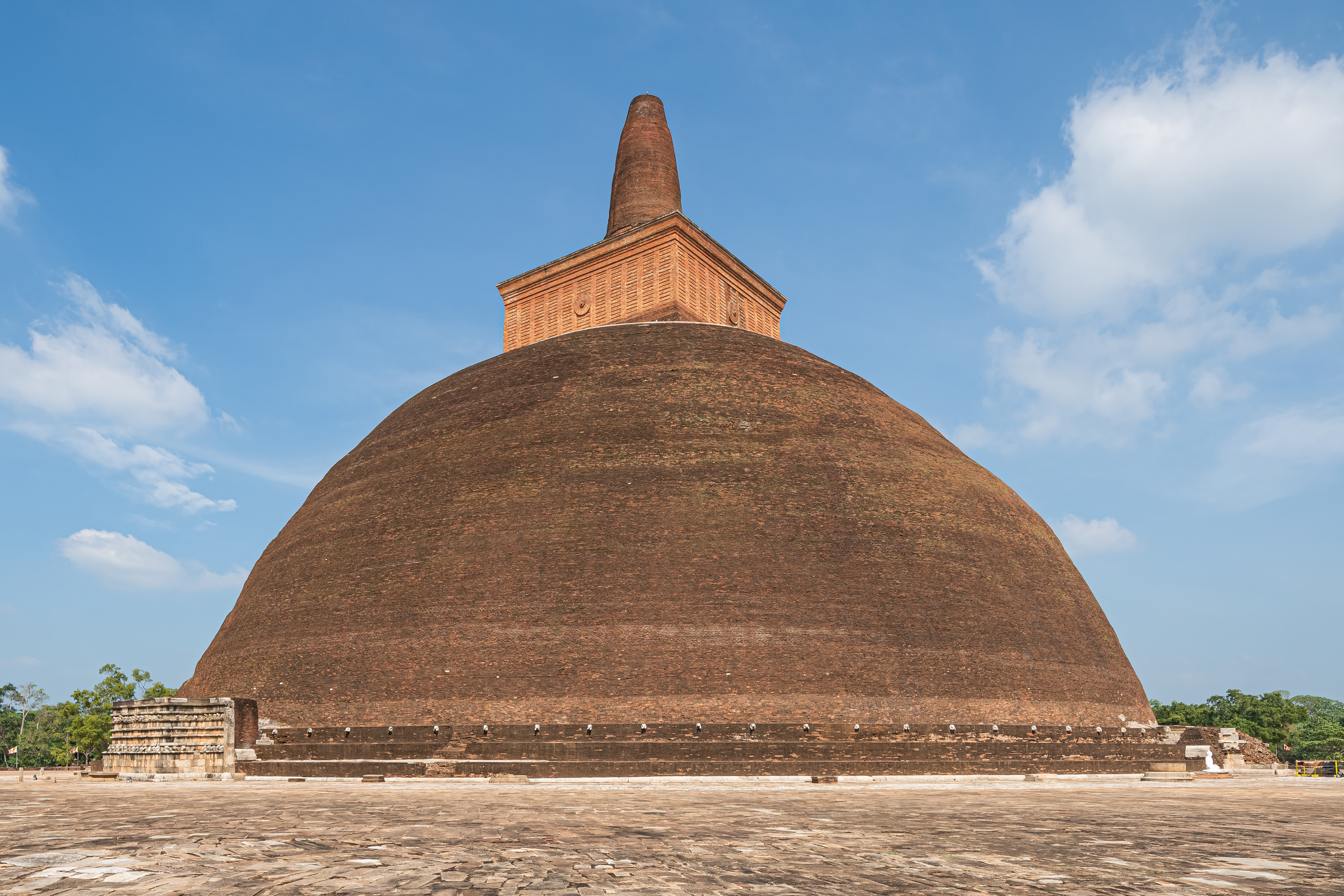
The Abhayagiri Stupa, built by Valagamba

The king built Abhayagiri Dagaba and a stupa, which has a height of about 70 metres (230 ft). The Abhayagiri temple became one of the three main Buddhist institutions in the country. He converted the caves he was hiding in to a temple. This temple is known as the Dambulla Rock Temple. King Valagamba also built several other temples. The Tripitaka, which had been handed down orally by the Bhikkhu order, was recorded on books made of palm leaf paper in the Aluvihara Temple, Matale during the Fourth Buddhist Council.

== Religious conflict ==
The Abhayagiri Stupa was offered to Kuppikala Mahatissa Thero by the king to show his gratitude. This was the first time a temple was offered privately to a monk and it caused the first conflict between the Sangha when 500 Bhikkus decided to leave Mahavihara and join Abhayagiriya where they created another sect. This is the first schism in Buddhism in Sri Lanka.

There is a major discrepancy between the sources which cite the death of Valagamba of Anuradhapura as occurring in 77 BC and his patronization of the effort to commit the Buddhist oral traditions to writing in the period 29 to 17 BC as cited by Norman.

The Dipavamsa states that during the reign of Valagamba (Vattagamani Abhaya) (29–17 BC) the monks who had previously remembered the Tipitaka and its commentary orally now wrote them down in books, because of the threat posed by famine, war, and the growing power of the newly established Abhayagiri vihara, which enjoyed the king's favour. The Mahavamsa also refers briefly to the writing down of the canon and the commentaries at this time.

This chronology which places Vattagamani's second reign in 29–17 BC was originally devised in 1912 by Wilhelm Geiger in the preface to his translation of the Mahavamsa. This 1912 chronology does not agree with date assignments calculated by later researchers into Sinhalese history.

== See also ==
- List of Sri Lankan monarchs
- Beminitiya Seya

Valagamba King of Sri Lanka
Regnal titles
Preceded by Dathika	King of Anuradhapura; 103 BCE and c.89–77 BCE	Succeeded by Mahakuli Mahatissa
