= Thulatthana =

Thulatthana තුලත්ථන
- King of Anuradhapura
- Reign: 119 BC
- Predecessor: Saddha Tissa
- Successor: Lanja Tissa
- Dynasty: House of Vijaya
- Father: Saddha Tissa
- Religion: Theravāda Buddhism

Thulatthana (Sinhala: තුලත්ථන) was an early monarch of the Kingdom of Anuradhapura, based at the ancient capital of Anuradhapura that ruled in the year 119 BC. Thulatthana was the son of Saddha Tissa and the brother of Lanja Tissa, Khallata Naga and Valagamba.

== See also ==
- List of Sri Lankan monarchs

Thulatthana Born: ? ? Died: ? ?
Regnal titles
Preceded by Saddha Tissa	King of Anuradhapura; 119 BC	Succeeded by Lanja Tissa
