= 122 BC =

122 BC in various calendars
- Gregorian calendar: 122 BC; CXXII BC
- Ab urbe condita: 632
- Ancient Egypt era: XXXIII dynasty, 202
- Pharaoh: Ptolemy VIII Physcon, 24
- Ancient Greek Olympiad (summer): 164th Olympiad, year 3
- Assyrian calendar: 4629
- Balinese saka calendar: N/A
- Bengali calendar: −715 – −714
- Berber calendar: 829
- Buddhist calendar: 423
- Burmese calendar: −759
- Byzantine calendar: 5387–5388
- Chinese calendar: 戊午年 (Earth Horse); 2576 or 2369 — to — 己未年 (Earth Goat); 2577 or 2370
- Coptic calendar: −405 – −404
- Discordian calendar: 1045
- Ethiopian calendar: −129 – −128
- Hebrew calendar: 3639–3640
- Hindu calendars
- Vikram Samvat: −65 – −64
- Shaka Samvat: N/A
- Kali Yuga: 2979–2980
- Holocene calendar: 9879
- Iranian calendar: 743 BP – 742 BP
- Islamic calendar: 766 BH – 765 BH
- Javanese calendar: N/A
- Julian calendar: N/A
- Korean calendar: 2212
- Minguo calendar: 2033 before ROC 民前2033年
- Nanakshahi calendar: −1589
- Seleucid era: 190/191 AG
- Thai solar calendar: 421–422
- Tibetan calendar: ས་ཕོ་རྟ་ལོ་ (male Earth-Horse); 5 or −376 or −1148 — to — ས་མོ་ལུག་ལོ་ (female Earth-Sheep); 6 or −375 or −1147

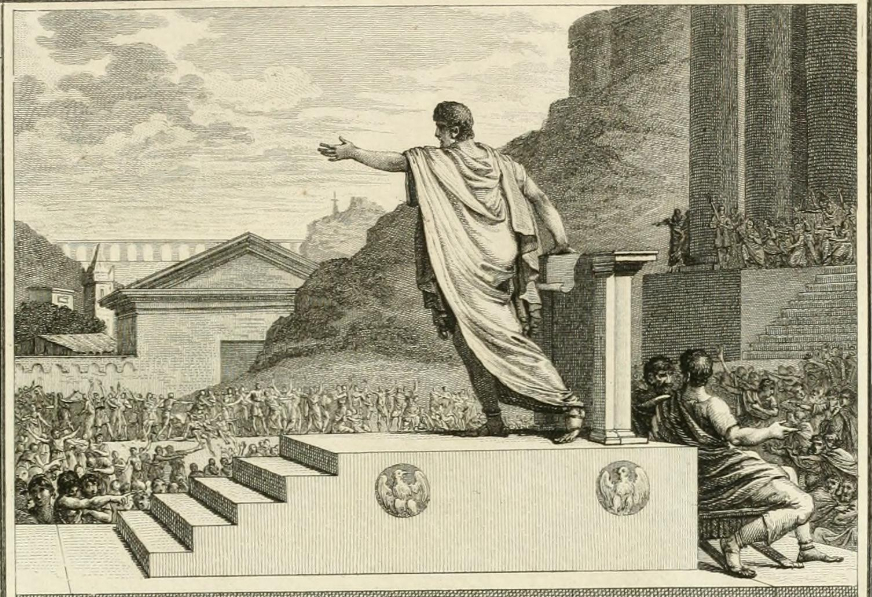
Gaius Gracchus addressing the Concilium Plebis (Rome)

Year 122 BC was a year of the pre-Julian Roman calendar. At the time it was known as the Year of the Consulship of Ahenobarbus and Fannius (or, less frequently, year 632 Ab urbe condita) and the First Year of Yuanshou. The denomination 122 BC for this year has been used since the early medieval period, when the Anno Domini calendar era became the prevalent method in Europe for naming years.

== Events ==
=== By place ===
==== Roman Republic ====
- Marcus Fulvius Flaccus and Gaius Gracchus become tribunes and propose a number of radical reforms in Rome.
- Gracchus passes a law requiring the state to provide weapons and equipment for the soldiers in the Roman army.

==== China ====
- Emperor Wu of Han appoints Liu Ju, his son by Empress Wei Zifu, as Crown Prince.

== Deaths ==
- Liu An, Chinese prince, geographer, and cartographer (b. 179 BC)
