= Saddha Tissa of Anuradhapura =

King of Anuradhapura from 137 to 119 BC

Saddha Tissa සද්ධා තිස්ස
- King of Anuradhapura
- Reign: 137 BC – 119 BC
- Predecessor: Dutugamunu
- Successor: Thulatthana
- Born: Thissamaharama, Hambanthota
- Died: 119 BC
- Issue: Lanja Tissa; Thulatthana; Khallata Naga; Valagamba
- House: House of Vijaya
- Father: Kavan Tissa
- Mother: Viharamahadevi
- Religion: Theravāda Buddhism

Saddha Tissa (Sinhala: සද්ධා තිස්ස), [sadda: tissə]), also known as Sadaha Tiss (Sinhala: සැදැහැ තිස්, [sædæɦæ tis]), was the king of Anuradhapura (Sri Lanka) from 137 BC to 119 BC. Saddha Tissa was the son of Kavan Tissa of Ruhuna and the brother of Dutthagamani. He was the ruler of Digamadulla, the present day eastern province of Sri Lanka.

Since crown prince Saliya married a Chandala girl, King Dutugamunu’s younger brother, Saddha Tissa was consecrated as King. King Saddha Tissa continued the remaining work in Mahathupa.

During Saddha Tissa's reign, there was a major fire in the Lovamahapaya. The king subsequently reconstructed the Lowa Maha Paaya at one third of the cost with seven levels, two less than before.

King Saddha Tissa built the Dighavapi vihara and the Duratissa reservoir. The Duratissa reservoir has an embankment 3,400 feet (1,000 m) long and 14 feet (4.3 m) high. The top of the bank is 15 feet (4.6 m) wide. The reservoir has a capacity of 336 million cubic feet (9,500,000 m^{3}) and a surface area of 1,230 acres (500 ha).

After King Saddha Tissa’s death, Mahasangha supported the second son of the king, Thulatthana.

== See also ==
- List of Sri Lankan monarchs

Saddha Tissa of Anuradhapura Born: ? ? Died: ? ?
Regnal titles
Preceded by Dutthagamani	King of Anuradhapura; 137 BC–119 BC	Succeeded by Thulatthana
