= Beminitiya Seya =

Famine in present-day Sri Lanka between 103 and 89 BCE

- Country: Anuradhapura Kingdom
- Period: 103–89 BCE
- Total deaths: Unknown

Beminitiya Seya (Sinhala: බැමිණිතියා සාය/බ්‍රාහ්මණ තීය සාගතය, [bæmiɳitija: sa:jə]), also known as the Great Famine (103–89 BCE) was a major famine which occurred in the Anuradhapura Kingdom during the rule of the Five Dravidians, shortly after overthrow of King Valagambahu. For over a decade, the irrigation systems of the Anuradhapura Kingdom had failed as a result of invasion, corruption and neglect.

It was undoubtedly one of the darkest eras of Sri Lankan history. Long periods of drought coupled with South Indian invasion meant that maintenance and repair of the once advanced irrigation systems of the kingdom were now completely neglected. The situation eased after the death of the last of the Five Dravidians and the return of King Valagambahu. As soon as Valagambahu returned to the throne in 89 BCE, many reforms were introduced to repair and reconstruct the ill-fated irrigation systems of the kingdom, which eventually brought the Beminitiya Seya to an end in 89 BCE. To this day, Valagambahu is regarded as one of Sri Lanka's greatest kings.

The famine is mentioned a number of times in the stories contained in the "Sihalavatthu Pakarana", the oldest work of Sri Lankan literature. In this work, it is related that many monks left the island during the famine to India or the Maldives.
