= Qiedihou =

Chanyu of the Xiongnu Empire

- Qiedihou Chanyu
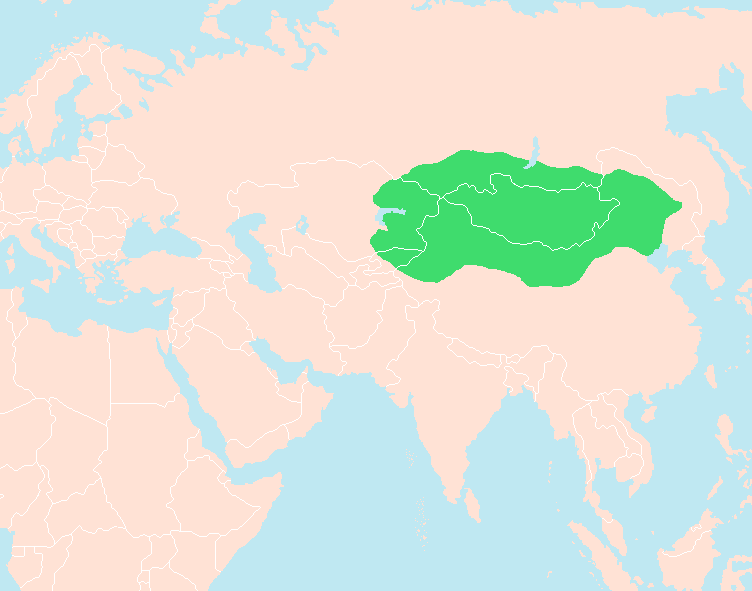
- Domain and influence of the Xiongnu
- Reign: c. 101–96 BC
- Predecessor: Xulihu
- Successor: Hulugu
- Dynasty: Modu Chanyu
- Father: Yizhixie

Qiedihou (Chinese: 且鞮侯; r. 101–96 BCE), whose name was probably Qiedi, was a chanyu of the Xiongnu Empire, and the successor to Xulihu. His reign was contemporaneous with that of the Emperor Wu of Han (r. 141–87 BC). He was the younger brother of Xulihu, who died, after a one-year reign, during a campaign against the newly built Western Han fort Shuofang in Ordos.

Qiedihou reigned during one of the most aggressive periods in Chinese history, and one of the many troubled periods in Xiongnu history. In 101 BCE Qiedihou, wishing to establish relations with the Han, said immediately after accession to the throne: “I am a child. How can I view the Han Emperor as an enemy when I have a venerable old man in front of me?” He returned to the Han all detained ambassadors.

== Life ==
Qiedihou succeeded his brother Xulihu in 101 BC. In 101 BC, the Xiongnu raided Dingxiang, Yunzhong, Zhangye, and Jiuquan.

Considering that Qiedihou would look favourably on the Han dynasty, the Han emperor decided to try to achieve his goal of persuading the Chanyu to submit to the Han dynasty. The difficult economic situation in the Han dynasty, created by long struggles with northern, western and southern neighbours, prompted Emperor Wu to try to settle relations with the Xiongnu through peaceful negotiations. In 101 BC an embassy headed by Su Wu left for the Xiongnu loaded with rich gifts. However, contrary to Han expectations, Qiedihou was reported to be very arrogant, and the question of allegiance was not even raised.

While visiting the Xiongnu, a deputy of Su Wu, Zhang Sheng, made contact with Han prisoners and conspired with them to revolt, kidnap the Qiedihou's mother, assassinate the Qiedihou's half-Han advisor Wei Lü, and then head home. Zhang Sheng also tried to bribe the Xiongnu's Prince of Gou and Yu Chang. The plot was uncovered, and one of its leaders pointed to Zhang Sheng. Qiedihou executed the conspirators, and urged the members of the embassy to admit their guilt and switch to the side of the Xiongnu. When Su Wu refused to betray his country, he was sent to Lake Baikal, where he spent 19 years before he could return to the Han dynasty.

In mid 99 BC, Li Guangli and three other Han generals led a force of 35,000 against the Xiongnu in the Tian Shan range. Initially successful, Li Guangli defeated the Wise King (Tuqi) of the Right and killed some 10,000 Xiongnu, but was surrounded on the way back and had to defend himself. They managed to drive back the Xiongnu before trying to head back to the Han dynasty. The Xiongnu gave chase leading to heavy casualties for the Han army. Li Guangli returned with less than half of his original army. The other Han generals, Li Ling and Lu Bode, had been left further back earlier as a rear guard, but Lu Bode objected to serving under Li Ling and decided to advance with only 5,000 infantry, confident that his force of crossbowmen would be able to handle any Xiongnu force they encountered. He was confronted by a force of 30,000 Xiongnu and had set up fortifications between two hills. The Xiongnu made repeated charges on his position, but failed to overcome Li Ling's crossbow and shield/spear formation, suffering heavy casualties. When Li Ling's forces sought to retreat, but the Xiongnu chased after them, harassing them until nightfall. Only 400 men made it back and Li Ling was captured.

Qiedihou had two sons; the elder was the Wise King of the Left. Before his death Qiedihou bequeathed him the throne under the name of Hulugu Chanyu (rightful Lateral Succession).

== Footnotes ==
Preceded by Xulihu	Chanyu of the Xiongnu Empire; 101–96 BC	Succeeded by Hulugu
