= Huang Shen =

Qing Chinese painter

- Lin Bu appreciates the plum flower by Huang Shen, Nanjing Museum
- Traditional Chinese: 黃慎
- Simplified Chinese: 黄慎
Transcriptions
Standard Mandarin
- Hanyu Pinyin: Huáng Shèn
- Wade–Giles: Huang Shen

Huang Shen (1687–1772) was a Chinese painter during the Qing Dynasty. Huang was born in Ninghua, Fujian province, to a poor family. His courtesy names were Gongshou (恭壽) and Gongmao (恭懋). His pseudonym was Yingpiaozi (癭瓢子).

He began his training under the painter Shangguan Zhou (上官周). In the earliest part of his career he excelled at cursive calligraphy and favored a meticulous style modelled after Ni Zan. He became better known as an artistic innovator who was one of the Eight Eccentrics of Yangzhou. When it came to paintings of people he favored images of religious, historic, and common people. His more famous works include The Drunk Monk and Shepherd Su Wu.

the old holds a musical stone

Holding Plum Flower

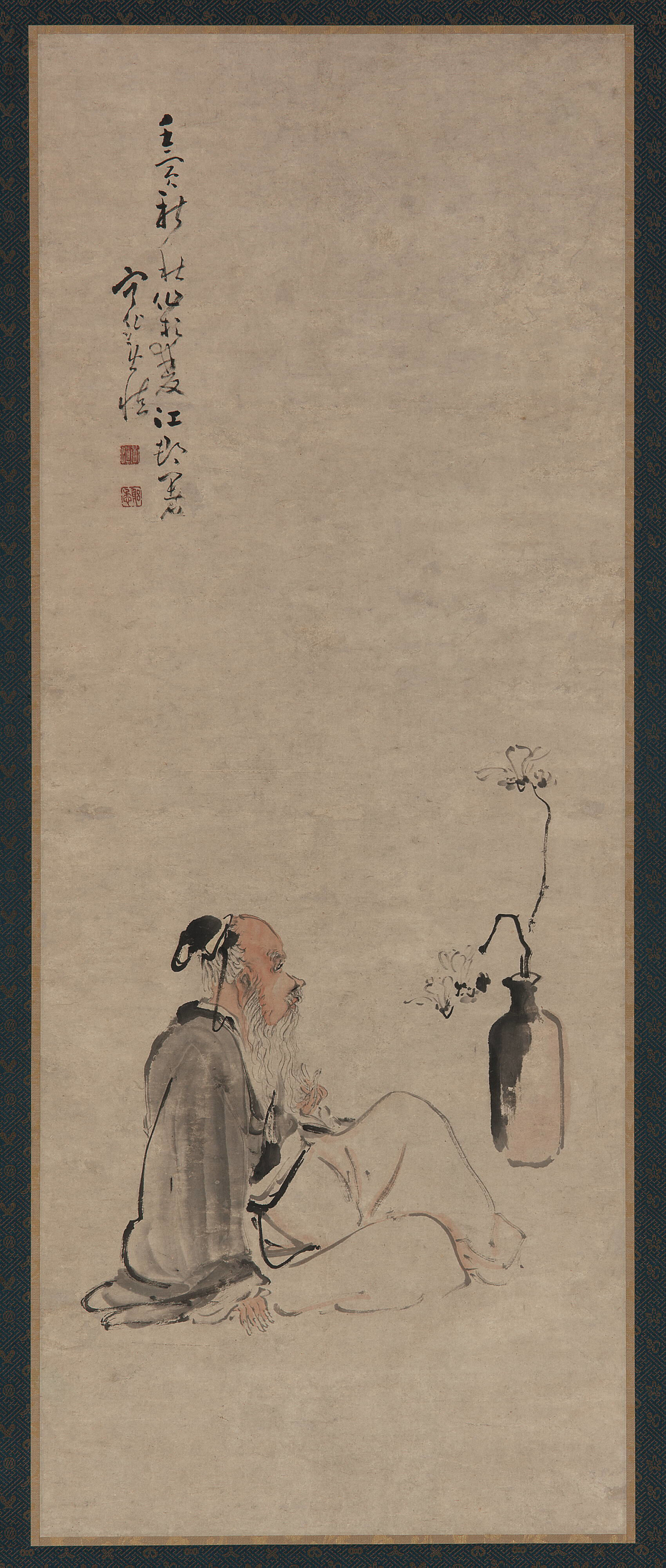
The old in flower viewing

== Sources ==
- Chinese Paintings in the Ashmolean Museum Oxford (73) Oxford ISBN 1-85444-132-9
- National Palace Museum
- China culture.org
- HK artclub
