= 179 BC =

179 BC in various calendars
- Gregorian calendar: 179 BC; CLXXIX BC
- Ab urbe condita: 575
- Ancient Egypt era: XXXIII dynasty, 145
- Pharaoh: Ptolemy VI Philometor, 2
- Ancient Greek Olympiad (summer): 150th Olympiad, year 2
- Assyrian calendar: 4572
- Balinese saka calendar: N/A
- Bengali calendar: −772 – −771
- Berber calendar: 772
- Buddhist calendar: 366
- Burmese calendar: −816
- Byzantine calendar: 5330–5331
- Chinese calendar: 辛酉年 (Metal Rooster); 2519 or 2312 — to — 壬戌年 (Water Dog); 2520 or 2313
- Coptic calendar: −462 – −461
- Discordian calendar: 988
- Ethiopian calendar: −186 – −185
- Hebrew calendar: 3582–3583
- Hindu calendars
- Vikram Samvat: −122 – −121
- Shaka Samvat: N/A
- Kali Yuga: 2922–2923
- Holocene calendar: 9822
- Iranian calendar: 800 BP – 799 BP
- Islamic calendar: 825 BH – 824 BH
- Javanese calendar: N/A
- Julian calendar: N/A
- Korean calendar: 2155
- Minguo calendar: 2090 before ROC 民前2090年
- Nanakshahi calendar: −1646
- Seleucid era: 133/134 AG
- Thai solar calendar: 364–365
- Tibetan calendar: ལྕགས་མོ་བྱ་ལོ་ (female Iron-Bird) −52 or −433 or −1205 — to — ཆུ་ཕོ་ཁྱི་ལོ་ (male Water-Dog) −51 or −432 or −1204

Year 179 BC was a year of the pre-Julian Roman calendar. At the time it was known as the Year of the Consulship of Flaccus and Fulvianus (or, less frequently, year 575 Ab urbe condita). The denomination 179 BC for this year has been used since the early medieval period, when the Anno Domini calendar era became the prevalent method in Europe for naming years.

== Events ==
=== By place ===
==== Roman Republic ====
- Tiberius Sempronius Gracchus goes to Hispania as Roman governor to deal with uprisings there.
- The Pons Aemilius is completed across the Tiber River in Rome. It is regarded as the world's first stone bridge.
- Marcus Aemilius Lepidus is appointed both censor and princeps senatus.

==== Greece ====
- Philip V of Macedon dies at Amphipolis in Macedonia, remorseful for having put his younger son Demetrius to death, at the instigation of his older son Perseus. Nevertheless, he is succeeded by his son Perseus.

==== Asia Minor ====
- Eumenes II of Pergamum defeats Pharnaces I of Pontus in a major battle. Finding himself unable to cope with the combined forces of Eumenes and Ariarathes IV of Cappadocia, Pharnaces is compelled to purchase peace by ceding all his conquests in Galatia and Paphlagonia, with the exception of Sinope.

== Births ==
- Dong Zhongshu, Chinese scholar who is traditionally associated with the promotion of Confucianism as the official ideology of the Chinese imperial state (d. 104 BC)
- Liu An, Chinese prince, geographer, and cartographer (d. 122 BC)
- Sima Xiangru, Chinese statesman, poet, and musician (d. 117 BC)

== Deaths ==
- Liu Xiang, Chinese prince involved in the Lü Clan Disturbance in 180 BC and grandson of Emperor Gao of Han
- Philip V, king of Macedonia from 221 BC, whose attempt to extend Macedonian influence throughout Greece has occurred at a time of growing Roman involvement in Greek affairs and resulted in his military defeat by Rome (b. 238 BC)
