= Lanja Tissa =

Lanja Tissa ලංජතිස්ස

King of Anuradhapura and Ruhuna
- Reign: 119 BC – 109 BC
- Predecessor: Thulatthana
- Successor: Khallata Naga
- Died: 109 BC
- House: House of Vijaya
- Dynasty: Shakya
- Father: Saddha Tissa
- Religion: Theravāda Buddhism

Lanja Tissa (Sinhala: ලංජතිස්ස), also known as Lamani Tissa, was an early monarch of Sri Lanka of the Anuradhapura Kingdom from 119 BC to 109 BC.

== Reign ==
Lanja Tissa was the eldest son of king Saddha Tissa who ruled in Anuradhapura. According to the customs of the Sinhalese King's at Anuradhapura, Lanja Tissa was the King of the kingdom of Ruhuna, while his father was ruling the Anuradhapura.

When Saddha Tissa died, his younger son Thulatthana became the king of Anuradhapura, with the support of the Bhikkus of Maha Vihara. When Lanja Tissa heard this news, he marched from Ruhuna, with his men to Anuradhapura and removed Thulatthana from the throne, and became the king.

This incident initially upset Lanja Tissa with the Bhikkus in his early period of rule, But later on he started to work for the betterment of Buddhism in the country.

== See also ==
- List of Sri Lankan monarchs

Lanja Tissa Born: ? ? Died: ? 109 BC
Regnal titles
Preceded by Thulatthana	King of Anuradhapura; 119 BC–109 BC	Succeeded by Khallata Naga
