= Palestrina =

Palestrina may refer to:

- Palestrina, Lazio, a city in Lazio, Italy
- Giovanni Pierluigi da Palestrina (c. 1525 – 1594), Italian Renaissance composer
- Palestrina (opera), by Hans Pfitzner, 1917
- Palestrina, an 1886 opera by Johann Sachs
- Palestrina - Prince of Music, a 2009 Italian/German music film
- Roman Catholic Suburbicarian Diocese of Palestrina, based in the city
- 4850 Palestrina, a minor planet

== See also ==
- Palestrina Choir, resident choir at St Mary's Cathedral, Dublin, Ireland
- Palestrina Glacier, Alexander Island, Antarctica
- US Palestrina 1919, an Italian association football club
