= Su Wu =

Chinese diplomat and politician

Su Wu 苏武
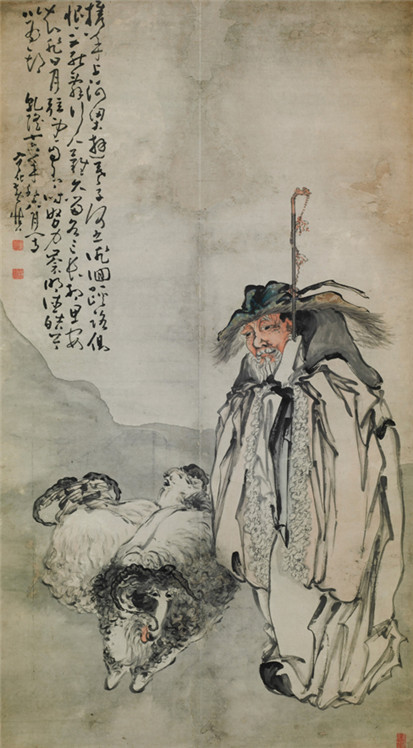
- Su Wu Tending Sheep, Qing era portrait by Huang Shen
- Born: 140s BC; Xi'an, Shaanxi
- Died: 60 BC (aged 80s)
- Occupations: Diplomat, politician

Su Wu (simplified Chinese: 苏武; traditional Chinese: 蘇武; pinyin: Sū Wǔ; Wade–Giles: Su Wu; 140s BC - 60 BC) was a Chinese diplomat and politician of the Western Han dynasty. He is known in Chinese history for making the best of his mission into foreign territory. During his mission he was captured and then detained for nineteen years, enduring major hardship at least in the early years of his captivity. Nevertheless, he endured this treatment while remaining faithful to his mission and his homeland.

According to Chinese tradition, in the early stages of his captivity, Su Wu was so deprived of food that he only survived in the cold north lands by eating his coverings, then enduring long years of servitude herding sheep, before managing to return home. He was able to return home after deceiving his captors with a story about his having sent a message back to the Western Han dynasty by means of tying a letter on the leg of a wild goose.

Su's loyalty to the Western Han is emphasised by the story that during his detainment he married a wife, that he had children by her, but that he chose to return to his homeland, even though it meant abandoning his wife and children. Su Wu is depicted in the Wu Shuang Pu (無雙譜, Table of Peerless Heroes) by Jin Guliang.

== Mission to Xiongnu ==
Little is known about Su's life or career other than his mission beyond the borders of the Western Han involving the Xiongnu, a mission which turned out to be drastically more trying and lengthy than expected.

In 100 BC, there was a short-lived détente between long-term adversaries the Western Han and the Xiongnu. One year earlier, in 101 BC, a new chanyu had come to power in Xiongnu, Chanyu Qiedihou (且鞮侯), who had expressed an interest in peace with the Han and who, as a goodwill gesture, had allowed some Han diplomats who had been detained by the Xiongnu to return to the Western Han, along with gifts from the chanyu.

In response, in 100 BC, Emperor Wu of Han commissioned Su, then the deputy commander of the imperial guards, to serve as an ambassador to Xiongnu. His deputy was fellow deputy commander, Zhang Sheng (張勝), and the third in command was Chang Hui (常惠). However, once they arrived at the Xiongnu chanyu's headquarters, Chanyu Qiedihou was far more arrogant than expected, which angered Zhang. In response, Zhang plotted with two Xiongnu officials, the Prince of Gou (緱王) and Yu Chang (虞常), to assassinate Chanyu Qiedihou's half-Han advisor Wei Lü (衛律) and kidnap the chanyu's mother.

The Prince of Gou and Yu Chang carried out their plot while the chanyu was away on a hunt, but someone alerted the chanyu, who quickly returned and killed the Prince of Gou in battle and captured Yu. Yu admitted to plotting with Zhang. Zhang, alarmed, informed Su, who had been unaware of Zhang's plot. Aware that the chanyu was planning on forcing him to surrender to Xiongnu, Su tried to preserve his dignity by committing suicide with his sword. Wei, who had wanted Su to surrender and become an advisor to the chanyu as well, quickly summoned doctors and was able to just save Su's life. Chanyu Qiedihou, impressed with Su's heroism, also sent messengers to care for Su's recovery, while putting Zhang and Chang under arrest.

After Su recovered, Chanyu Qiedihou decided to publicly execute Yu as an example and to force the entire Han mission to surrender. Zhang became apprehensive and surrendered. Su, however, was not shaken even when Wei put his sword onto Su's neck while Zhang tried to explain that he would be greatly honoured to be the chanyu's advisor. Su rebuked him for his faithlessness to the Western Han and refused to surrender.

== Life in exile ==
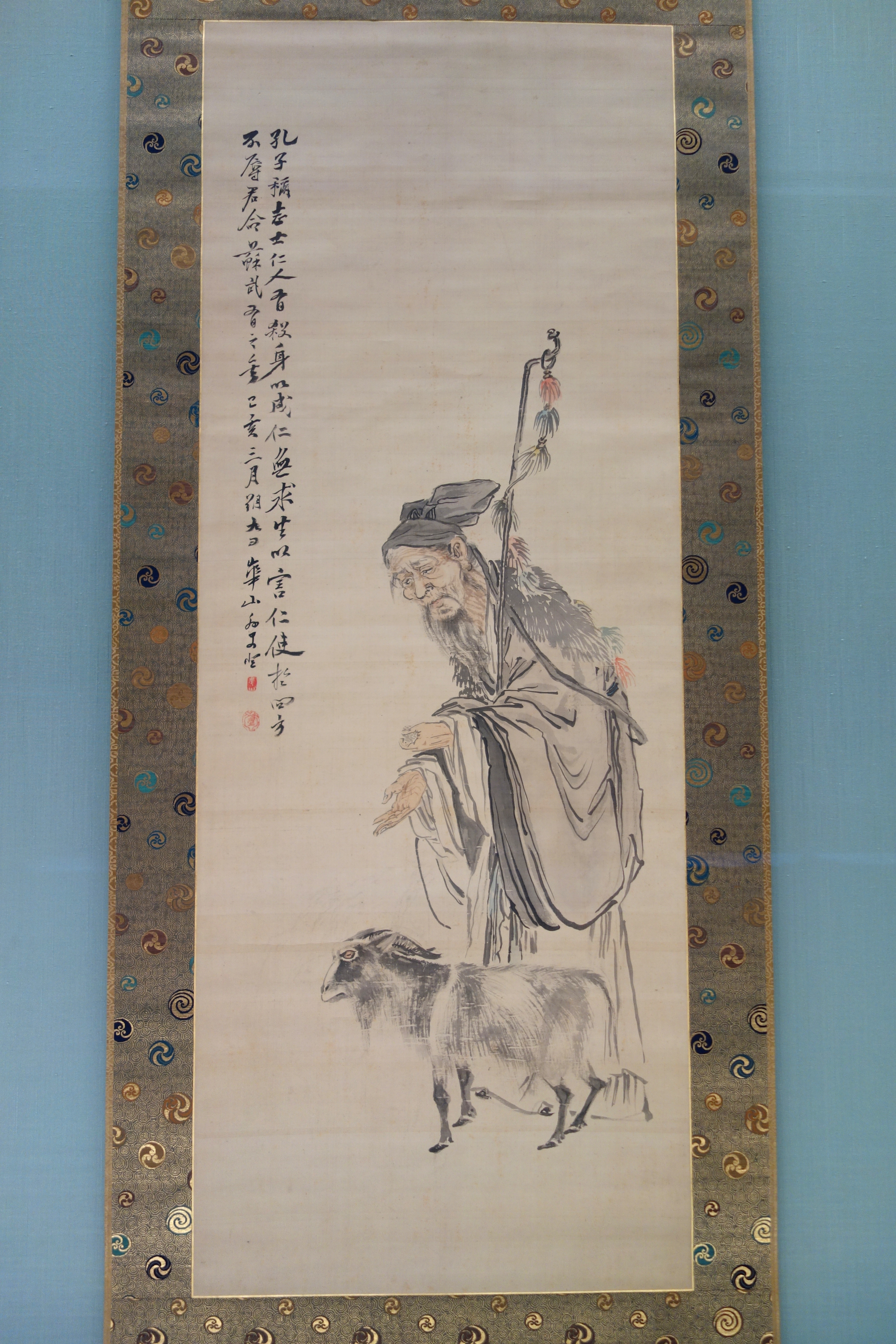
Portrait of Su Wu by Watanabe Kazan (1793-1841), Edo period, dated 1839 (Tenpo 10), light colour on silk - Tokyo National Museum - DSC06123

Unable to force Su to surrender, Chanyu Qiedihou decided to try to torture him by starvation, and so put him in a cellar without food and drink. However, for several days, Su survived by consuming wool from his coat and the snow that fell into the cellar. The chanyu was further surprised and thought that the gods were protecting him. The chanyu then exiled him to Lake Baikal and ordered him to tend a flock of male sheep, telling him that he would be allowed to go home when the sheep produced young. It is conjectured, with some evidence based on correspondence later between Su and Li Ling that the chanyu gave Su a Xiongnu wife, and they had children.

During exile, Su often lacked food, as the food supplies coming from the Xiongnu headquarters were not arriving steadily. He often had to resort to eating grass roots and wild rodents. Regardless of the difficulties, however, Su always held onto the imperial staff (節) given to all imperial messengers, and he used it as the shepherd's rod so much that the decorative hairs on the staff eventually all fell off.

Twice, during exile, the chanyu sent Li Ling, who had surrendered to Xiongnu after being defeated on the battlefield in 99 BC, to visit Su. The first time, Li informed Su that his two brothers had both been accused of crimes and committed suicide; that his mother had died; and that his wife had remarried. He tried to convince Su to surrender, but Su refused. On the second occasion, Li informed him of Emperor Wu's passing, and Su was so despondent that in mourning that he vomited blood. When the Emperor of Han died, Su Wu faced south towards his old homeland of China and wept in utter sadness.

== Return to Han ==
In 81 BC, Han was again in a détente with Xiongnu, when Han ambassadors inquired of Su's fate. The Xiongnu government claimed that Su had long died. However, Su's old assistant Chang Hui secretly informed the ambassadors of Su's exile, and the ambassadors, under Chang's suggestion, told then chanyu Huyandi (壺衍鞮) that Emperor Zhao had killed a migratory goose while hunting, and that a letter from Su seeking help was found on the bird's foot. Surprised, Chanyu Huyandi admitted that Su was in fact still alive, recalled him and allowed him as well as his nine followers to go home. In all, he was in exile for 19 years.

Once Su returned to Han, he was given the position of Director of Colonization (典屬國), a high-ranking official post. He remained in that post at least until the early years of Emperor Xuan's reign—late 70s BC. In 51 BC, when Emperor Xuan, in gratitude to 11 key officials who served him well, had their portraits painted onto the main gallery of the main imperial palace, Su was one of the 11 so portrayed.

== Impact on Chinese history ==
Su was often regarded as the epitome of faithful service in light of great odds and trials. His story was often invoked when acts of great faith or courage were performed by officials. His story, as undetailed as it was in actual history, often became subjects of drama, poetry, and songs throughout Chinese history. Many people take him as a second Zhang Qian, who was also previously caught in the same situation, refused to surrender, and managed to escape back to Han China.

== Art ==
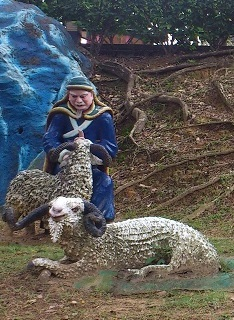
Statue of Su Wu at Haw Par Villa, Singapore.

=== Music ===
Among other musical works on the theme of Su Wu, a traditional Chinese melody, "Su Wu Mu Yang" (蘇武牧羊), is based on the story of Su Wu herding sheep. It is generally played on a Chinese flute.

=== Pictures ===
In graphical representations, such as the folk art of Chinese paper cutting, Su Wu is typically depicted herding sheep, with his staff.

=== Literature ===
In the Japanese Tale of the Heike the story of Su Wu and the letter tied to the migratory goose is retold. In this version, the Xiongnu amputate Su Wu's leg.

== See also ==
- Han poetry
