= 76 BC =

76 BC in various calendars
- Gregorian calendar: 76 BC; LXXVI BC
- Ab urbe condita: 678
- Ancient Egypt era: XXXIII dynasty, 248
- Pharaoh: Ptolemy XII Auletes, 5
- Ancient Greek Olympiad (summer): 176th Olympiad (victor)¹
- Assyrian calendar: 4675
- Balinese saka calendar: N/A
- Bengali calendar: −669 – −668
- Berber calendar: 875
- Buddhist calendar: 469
- Burmese calendar: −713
- Byzantine calendar: 5433–5434
- Chinese calendar: 甲辰年 (Wood Dragon); 2622 or 2415 — to — 乙巳年 (Wood Snake); 2623 or 2416
- Coptic calendar: −359 – −358
- Discordian calendar: 1091
- Ethiopian calendar: −83 – −82
- Hebrew calendar: 3685–3686
- Hindu calendars
- Vikram Samvat: −19 – −18
- Shaka Samvat: N/A
- Kali Yuga: 3025–3026
- Holocene calendar: 9925
- Iranian calendar: 697 BP – 696 BP
- Islamic calendar: 718 BH – 717 BH
- Javanese calendar: N/A
- Julian calendar: N/A
- Korean calendar: 2258
- Minguo calendar: 1987 before ROC 民前1987年
- Nanakshahi calendar: −1543
- Seleucid era: 236/237 AG
- Thai solar calendar: 467–468
- Tibetan calendar: ཤིང་ཕོ་འབྲུག་ལོ་ (male Wood-Dragon); 51 or −330 or −1102 — to — ཤིང་མོ་སྦྲུལ་ལོ་ (female Wood-Snake); 52 or −329 or −1101

Year 76 BC was a year of the pre-Julian Roman calendar. At the time it was known as the Year of the Consulship of Octavius and Curio (or, less frequently, year 678 Ab urbe condita). The denomination 76 BC for this year has been used since the early medieval period, when the Anno Domini calendar era became the prevalent method in Europe for naming years.

== Events ==
=== By place ===
==== Judea ====
- Salome Alexandra becomes queen of Judea, after the death of her husband, Alexander Jannaeus, until 67 BC.
- Hyrcanus II becomes high priest of Jerusalem for the first time, on the death of his father, Alexander Jannaeus, until 66 BC.

==== Roman Republic ====
- The Third Dalmatian war ends with the capture of Salona by proconsul Gaius Cosconius and the victory of Rome.
- On the Iberian Peninsula, in the Roman province of Hispania Citerior, the rebel forces of Quintus Sertorius defeat the republican army of Pompey the Great at the Battle of Lauron.

== Deaths ==
- Alexander Jannaeus, king and high priest of Judea
