= Khallata Naga =

Khallata Naga ඛල්ලාටනාග
- King of Anuradhapura
- Reign: 109 BC – 103 BC
- Predecessor: Lanja Tissa
- Successor: Valagamba
- Died: 103 BC
- Spouse: Queen Consort; Anuladevi
- Issue: Mahakuli Mahatissa
- House: House of Vijaya
- Father: Saddha Tissa
- Religion: Theravāda Buddhism

Khallata Naga (Sinhala: ඛල්ලාටනාග), also known as Kalunna, was an early monarch of Sri Lanka of the Anuradhapura Kingdom from 109 BC to 103 BC. The king had built 32 pasadas around the brazen palace.

== Reign ==
Khallata Naga was the third son of Saddha Tissa, and younger brother of Thulatthana and Lanja Tissa. In the period of his reign, three rebel princes, Tissa, Abha and Uttara tried to seize his throne.

== Works by the king ==
The king is credited with the construction of Kurundi Viharaya.

== See also ==
- List of Sri Lankan monarchs

Khallata Naga Born: ? ? Died: ? 103 BC
Royal titles
Preceded by Lanja Tissa	King of Anuradhapura; 109 BC–103 BC	Succeeded by Valagamba
