= 51 BC =

51 BC in various calendars
- Gregorian calendar: 51 BC; LI BC
- Ab urbe condita: 703
- Ancient Egypt era: XXXIII dynasty, 273
- Pharaoh: Cleopatra VII, 1
- Ancient Greek Olympiad (summer): 182nd Olympiad, year 2
- Assyrian calendar: 4700
- Balinese saka calendar: N/A
- Bengali calendar: −644 – −643
- Berber calendar: 900
- Buddhist calendar: 494
- Burmese calendar: −688
- Byzantine calendar: 5458–5459
- Chinese calendar: 己巳年 (Earth Snake); 2647 or 2440 — to — 庚午年 (Metal Horse); 2648 or 2441
- Coptic calendar: −334 – −333
- Discordian calendar: 1116
- Ethiopian calendar: −58 – −57
- Hebrew calendar: 3710–3711
- Hindu calendars
- Vikram Samvat: 6–7
- Shaka Samvat: N/A
- Kali Yuga: 3050–3051
- Holocene calendar: 9950
- Iranian calendar: 672 BP – 671 BP
- Islamic calendar: 693 BH – 692 BH
- Javanese calendar: N/A
- Julian calendar: N/A
- Korean calendar: 2283
- Minguo calendar: 1962 before ROC 民前1962年
- Nanakshahi calendar: −1518
- Seleucid era: 261/262 AG
- Thai solar calendar: 492–493
- Tibetan calendar: ས་མོ་སྦྲུལ་ལོ་ (female Earth-Snake); 76 or −305 or −1077 — to — ལྕགས་ཕོ་རྟ་ལོ་ (male Iron-Horse); 77 or −304 or −1076

Year 51 BC was a year of the pre-Julian Roman calendar. At the time, it was known as the Year of the Consulship of Marcellus and Sulpicius (or, less frequently, year 703 Ab urbe condita). The denomination 51 BC for this year has been used since the early medieval period, when the Anno Domini calendar era became the prevalent method in Europe for naming years.

== Events ==
=== By place ===
==== Roman Republic ====
- Consuls: Marcus Claudius Marcellus and Servius Sulpicius Rufus.
- Pompey demands that Julius Caesar lay down his command before he can stand for consul.

==== Egypt ====
- by March 22 – Pharaoh Ptolemy XII Auletes dies and is succeeded by his eldest surviving daughter Cleopatra VII and her younger brother Ptolemy XIII as co-rulers of the Ptolemaic Kingdom. By August 29, official documents start listing Cleopatra as sole ruler.

==== Asia ====
- The Xiongnu split into two hordes. The Eastern horde is subject to China.

== Births ==
- Cheng, Chinese emperor of the Han dynasty (d. 7 BC)
- Publius Sulpicius Quirinius, Roman aristocrat (d. 21 AD)

== Deaths ==
- Ariobarzanes II (Philopator), king of Cappadocia
- Julia Minor, sister of Julius Caesar (b. 100 BC)
- Marcus Atius Balbus, Roman praetor and governor (b. 105 BC)
- Posidonius, Greek philosopher, astronomer and geographer
- Ptolemy XII (Auletes), king (pharaoh) of the Ptolemaic Kingdom
