= Wuwei Chanyu =

Chanyu of the Xiongnu Empire

Wuwei
- Chanyu
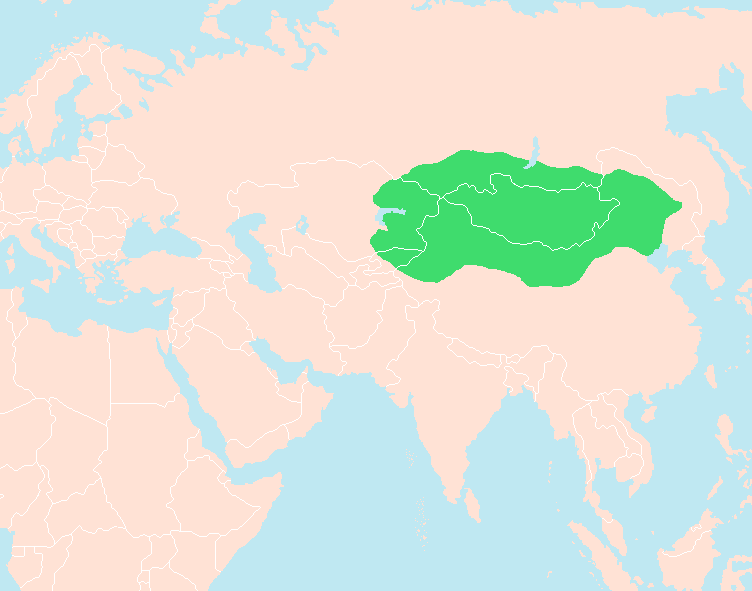
- Domain and influence of the Xiongnu
- Reign: c. 114–105 BCE
- Predecessor: Yizhixie Chanyu
- Successor: Er Chanyu
- Born: c. 131 BCE
- Died: 105 BCE (aged 25–26)
- Father: Yizhixie Chanyu

Wuwei (Chinese: 烏維; r. 114–105 BCE) was a chanyu of the Xiongnu Empire. Wuwei succeeded his father Yizhixie in 114 BC and died in 105 BC. He was succeeded by his son, Er Chanyu.

== Reign ==
Wuwei Chanyu ruled during the reign of the Han emperor Wudi (r. 141–87 BC), after Wudi broke the heqin peace and kinship treaty with the Xiongnu. His reign was marked by relative peace, with intensive diplomatic activities. The Xiongnu intended to restore the heqin peace and kinship treaty with the Han empire. In turn the Han Empire wanted to weaken, isolate, and bring the Xiongnu into submission. Neither party succeeded in their main objective, but the Chinese further undermined the Xiongnu's situation by splitting off their Wusun branch. Wuwei was a son of Yizhixie, and came to the throne by agnatic primogeniture succession. The Chinese annals preserved his title before the enthronement.

== Life ==
Wuwei Chanyu succeeded his father in 114 BC.

In late 111 BC, Gongsun He and Zhao Ponu led 25,000 cavalry against the Xiongnu, but failed to engage them.

In 110 BC Wudi assembled a 180,000-strong cavalry army in Shuofang, and sent Guo Ji to notify the Chanyu about the mobilization. When Guo Ji arrived, the Chanyu's master of ceremony asked him about the purpose his arrival. Guo Ji, with polite evasion, said that he wished to disclose it personally to the Chanyu. The Chanyu admitted him. Guo Ji told him: "If the Chanyu is in a position to mount a campaign and fight with the Chinese state, the Son of Sky himself, he is waiting for you at the border with an army; and if he is not in a position to fight, he should turn his face to the south and recognize himself a vassal of the House of Han." Wuwei was so enraged by this ultimatum that he immediately beheaded his master of ceremony and arrested Guo Ji, sending him off to Baikal in exile. In spite of that, the Chanyu was not inclined to attack the borders of China. Instead he gave rest to the troops and horses, and went hunting.

In 110 BC, Wuwei rejected Han suggestions that he should submit to Han authority. At one point Wuwei was persuaded to pay a visit to Chang'an but cancelled the trip when news reached him that an advance Xiongnu dignitary had died on the way there. Convinced that he had been killed by the Han, Wuwei rejected all offers of peace.

In 108 BC, Zhao Ponu sallied out with 25,000 cavalry against the Xiongnu but could not find them. He then attacked and subjugated the Loulan Kingdom and Jushi Kingdom with only 700 cavalry

== Death and successor ==
Wuwei Chanyu died in 105 BC. His son Wushilu, who was still a child, was proclaimed a chanyu according to their custom of agnatic primogeniture succession, and was named Er Chanyu. It is possible that there were no elder eligible candidates.

== Footnotes ==
Preceded by Yizhixie	Chanyu of the Xiongnu Empire; 114–105 BCE	Succeeded by Er Chanyu
