= Er Chanyu =

Chanyu of the Xiongnu Empire

Wushilu
- Er Chanyu
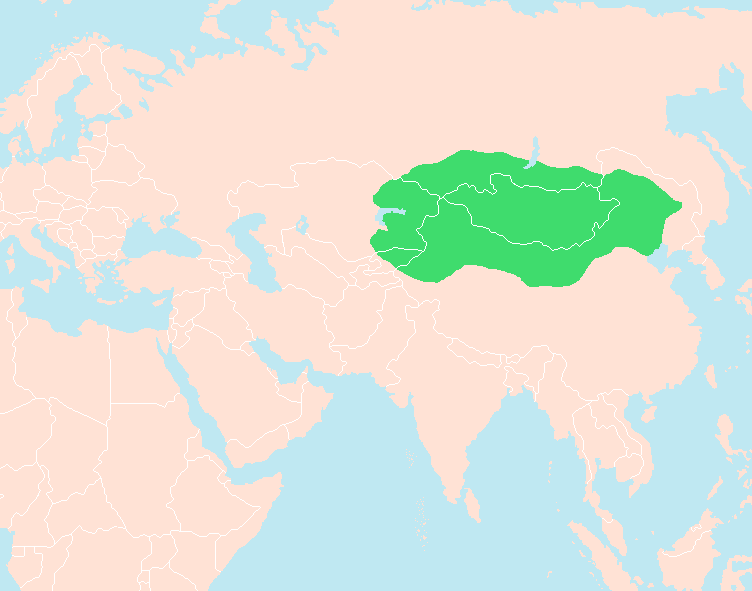
- Domain and influence of the Xiongnu
- Reign: c. 105–102 BC
- Predecessor: Wuwei Chanyu
- Successor: Xulihu Chanyu
- Born: c. 126 BC
- Died: 102 BCE (aged 23–24)
- Father: Wuwei Chanyu

Er Chanyu (Chinese: 兒單于; r. 105–102 BC), born Wushilu (Chinese: 烏師廬), was a chanyu of the Xiongnu Empire. He succeeded his father Wuwei Chanyu in 105 BC and died from an illness in 102 BC. Er Chanyu was succeeded by his uncle, Xulihu Chanyu.

In mid 103 BC, Zhao Ponu attacked the Xiongnu with 20,000 cavalry, but was surrounded and captured. The Xiongnu tried to take a Han stronghold after the victory but failed.

== Footnotes ==
Preceded by Wuwei Chanyu	Chanyu of the Xiongnu Empire; 105–102 BC	Succeeded by Xulihu Chanyu
