= Buddhist hermeneutics =

Buddhist religious interpretation

Buddhist hermeneutics refers to the interpretative frameworks historical Buddhists have used to interpret and understand Buddhist texts and to the interpretative instructions that Buddhists texts themselves impart upon the reader. Because of the broad variety of scriptures, Buddhist traditions and schools, there are also a wide variety of different hermeneutic approaches within Buddhism.

Buddhist scriptural exegesis has always been driven by the soteriological needs of the tradition to find the true meaning (artha) of Buddhist scriptures. Another important issue in Buddhist hermeneutics is the problem of which sutras are to be taken to be 'Buddhavacana', "the word of the Buddha" and also which sutras contain the correct teachings.

The Early Buddhist texts, such as the Sutta Pitaka and the Agamas, distinguish between Buddhist suttas that contain clear meaning (Pāli: Nītattha; Sanskrit: nītārtha) and those that require further interpretation (Pāli: neyyattha; Sanskrit: neyartha). This later developed into the two truths doctrine, which states there is a conventional truth and an ultimate truth. The Buddhist concept of Upaya (skillful means) is another common theme in Buddhist Hermeneutics, and holds that the Buddha sometimes taught things that were not literally true as a skillful teaching strategy, and also taught many different things to different people, depending on their ability to understand.

== Early Buddhist texts ==
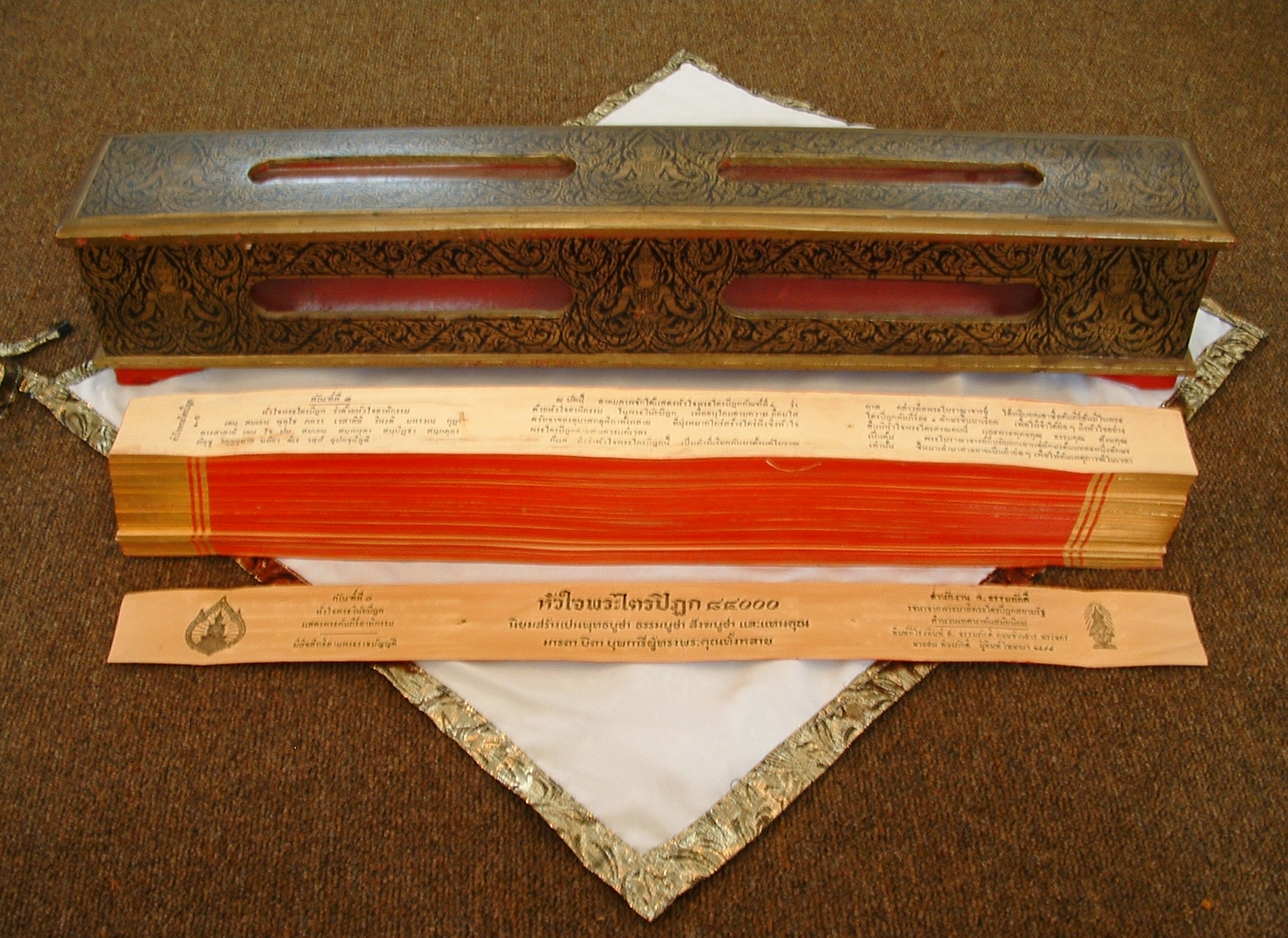
In pre-modern times Buddhist scripture was written on thin slices of wood (Palm-leaf manuscript or Bamboo). The leaves were kept on top of each other by thin sticks and the scripture is covered in cloth and kept in a box.

=== Four great references ===
The issue of how to determine if a teaching is a genuine teaching of the Buddha is present in the earliest Buddhist scriptures. One such text is the Mahaparinibbana Sutta, which has a section called 'The Four Great References' (mahāpadesa) that outlines a set of criteria for determining whether a teaching is from the Buddha. This sutta states that four references are acceptable:

1. The words of the Buddha himself, taught in person.
2. A community of Buddhist elders and their leader.
3. Several elder monks, who "are learned, who have accomplished their course, who are preservers of the Dhamma, the Discipline, and the Summaries."
4. A single monk, who "is learned, who has accomplished his course, who is a preserver of the Dhamma, the Discipline, and the Summaries."

In the cases where someone is not being directly taught by the Buddha however, the text goes on to say that the hearer should check these teachings by "carefully studying the sentences word by word, one should trace them in the Discourses and verify them by the Discipline." If they are not traceable to the suttas, one should reject them.

=== Neyyattha and nītattha ===
An important distinction the Early Buddhist texts outline is the distinction between statements that are Neyyattha ('needing to be drawn out/explained') and Nītattha ('fully drawn out'). The Neyyattha sutta states:

"Monks, these two slander the Tathagata. Which two? He who explains a discourse whose meaning needs to be inferred as one whose meaning has already been fully drawn out. And he who explains a discourse whose meaning has already been fully drawn out as one whose meaning needs to be inferred. These are two who slander the Tathagata."

This notion was later elaborated in the Theravada Abhidhamma and Mahayana literature as conventional or relative truth (sammuti- or vohaara-sacca) and ultimate truth (paramattha-sacca), and became known as the two truths doctrine.

=== Leading qualities ===
Another criterion the Buddha taught to differentiate Dhamma from what was not his teaching, was that of analyzing how a particular teaching affects one's thinking. The Gotami sutta states that anything that leads to dispassion, liberation, relinquishment, having few wishes, contentment, seclusion, arousing of energy and being easy to support are said to be the teacher's instruction, while anything that leads to the opposite of these qualities cannot be the true teaching of the Buddha. Hence in the Early Buddhist texts, the work of hermeneutics is deeply tied with the spiritual practice and a mindful awareness of the effect our practices have on our state of mind.

== Theravada ==
=== Buddhavacana stamp ===
In the Theravada tradition, all of the Tipitaka is held to be "the word of the Buddha" (Buddhavacana). However, for something to be Buddhavacana according to Theravada does not necessarily mean that it was spoken by the historical Buddha. Texts and teachings not spoken by the Buddha directly but taught by his disciples, such as the Theragatha, are said to be 'well said' (subhasitam) and an expression of the Dhamma and therefore to be Buddhavacana.

=== Quasi-canonical texts ===
Two early major Theravada hermeneutical texts are the Petakopadesa and the Nettipakarana (c. 1st century CE), both traditionally attributed to the exegete Mahākaccāna. Due to their significances, both texts are considered canonical in the Burmese tradition, as part of the Khuddaka Nikāya (see Quasi-canonical texts). The texts use the gradual path to Nirvana as a hermeneutical tool for explaining the teachings of the Buddha in a way that was relevant to both monastics and laypersons. These texts assume that the structure of the Dhamma is derived from the gradual path. They classify different types of persons (ordinary persons, initiates and the adepts), personality types (puggalapaññatti), and different types of suttas that the Buddha addressed to each type of person (suttas on morality, on penetrating wisdom, on Bhavana). Each type of sutta is meant to lead each type of person further on the graduated path to Nirvana.

Further, the Netti provides five guidelines (naya) and sixteen modes (hara) for clarifying the relationship between a text's linguistic convention (byanjana) and its true meaning (atha).

=== Commentary and sub-commentary ===
The interpretation of the Buddha's words is becoming central to the Theravada tradition. Because of this, many Theravada doctrines were developed in the commentaries (Atthakatha) and sub-commentaries to the Tipitaka, which are central interpretative texts. By far the most important Theravada commentator was the fifth-century scholar monk Buddhaghosa, who wrote commentaries on large portions of the Pali canon. The most notable subcommentator was Dhammapāla.

=== Grammatical interpretation ===
In later developments, grammatical interpretation, known as byākaraṇa, played a crucial role. Various grammatical traditions emerged to analyze and preserve the linguistic structure of the Pali texts, including:

- Kaccāyana school – The oldest surviving Pali grammatical tradition, which served as the foundation for subsequent grammatical works.
- Moggallāna school – A grammatical system developed by Moggallāna in the 12th century, characterized by its rigorous analytical approach and influence from Sanskrit grammar.
- Saddanīti school – A landmark tradition authored by Aggavaṃsa of Burma, widely regarded as one of the most comprehensive treatises on Pali grammar.

== Mahayana ==
Mahayana Buddhism has an immense number of texts, many of which were written and codified hundreds of years after the Buddha's death. In spite of this historical fact, they are still considered Buddhavacana. The vast canon of Mahayana texts is organized into groupings of teachings or "turnings of the wheel of Dharma." The Sandhinirmocana Sutra, for example, sees itself as inaugurating the third turning (Yogacara), which is the highest and most definitive teaching. Likewise, the Lotus sutra presents itself as being the ultimate and final teaching of the Buddha. Because of these mutually contradictory texts, Buddhist scholars had to find a way to harmonize the many different sutras and teachings into a coherent canon and interpretative framework, sometimes by outlining a classification system for them (Chinese:p'an-chiao). For example, in China, the Huayan school placed the Avatamsaka Sutra as the highest sutra, while the Tiantai school promotes the Lotus sutra at the top of their sutra hierarchy.

The Mahayana schools saw the 'lower' (Sravakayana) teachings as skillful means (Upaya) of guiding the less capable towards the higher teachings of the Mahayana sutras - even while disagreeing on which sutra represented the definitive meaning of the Buddha's enlightened message. The Buddha was said to have adapted his message based on his audience, expounding different teachings to different people, all depending on how intelligent and spiritually advanced they were. The Mahayana schools' classification systems were meant to organize sutras based on this hierarchical typology of persons (Sravakas, Mahayanists, etc). Buddhist schools' hierarchical classification systems were often used as tools in their doctrinal debates. As Etienne Lamotte writes: “Each school tends to take literally the doctrinal texts that conform to its theses and to consider those that cause dilemmas as being of provisional meaning.”

These doctrinal texts are those each school identifies as answering the core question of Mahayana hermeneutics: "What was the content of the Buddha's enlightenment?" Because of this focus, understanding a text's authorial intent is crucial for the spiritual development of the Buddhist practitioner. Buddhist hermeneutics is therefore an attempt to extract the Buddha's instructions and wisdom for spiritual praxis from a particular text. Because the goal of Buddhism is to become enlightened, according to Lamotte, the main validation of one's hermeneutical method is one's experience in meditation, and ultimately the experience of nirvana.

According to Alexander Berzin, the Indian Buddhist philosopher Dharmakirti in A Commentary on [Dignaga's "Compendium of] Validly Cognizing Minds proposed two decisive criteria for the authenticity of a Buddhist text:

Buddha taught an enormous variety of subjects, but only those themes that repeatedly appear throughout his teachings indicate what Buddha actually intended. These themes include taking safe direction (refuge), understanding the laws of behavioral cause and effect, developing higher ethical discipline, concentration, and discriminating awareness of how things actually exist, and generating love and compassion for all. A text is an authentic Buddhist teaching if it accords with these major themes. The second criterion for authenticity is that correct implementation of its instructions by qualified practitioners must bring about the same results as Buddha repeatedly indicated elsewhere. Proper practice must lead to achieving the ultimate goals of liberation or enlightenment and the provisional goals of spiritual attainment along the way.

=== Principles of exegesis ===
==== Four reliances ====
Various Mahayana sutras, like the Catuhpratisarana sutra and the Akṣayamatinirdeśa Sūtra sets forth a set of rules for Buddhist exegesis. These four reliances (Skt. catuḥpratisaraṇa) are:

1. Reliance on the meaning (artha) rather than the words (Sanskrit: arthapratiśaraṇena bhavitavyaṃ na vyañjanapratiśaraṇena, Tibetan: don la rton par bya yi tshig ’bru la rton par mi bya, Chinese: yīyì bù yīyǔ, 依義不依語)
2. Reliance on the teaching (Dharma) rather than on the person [who delivers the teaching] (Sanskrit: dharmapratiśaraṇena bhavitavyaṃ na pudgalapratiśaraṇena, Tibetan: chos la rton par bya yi gang zag la rton par mi bya, Chinese: yīfǎ bù yīrén, 依法不依人)
3. Reliance on wisdom (jñāna) rather than [ordinary] consciousnesses or vijñāna (Sanskrit: jñānapratiśaraṇena bhavitavyaṃ na vijñānapratiśaraṇena, Tibetan: ye shes la rton par bya yi rnam shes la rton par mi bya, Chinese: yīzhì bù yīshí, 依智不依識)
4. Reliance on the definitive meaning (nītārtha) rather than the neyārtha - provisional meaning (Sanskrit: nītārthasūtrapratiśaraṇena bhavitavyaṃ na neyārthasūtrapratiśaraṇena, Tibetan: nges don la rton par bya yi drang don la rton par mi bya, Chinese: yīliǎoyì bù yī bùliǎoyì, 依了義不依不了義)

==== Four hidden intentions ====
The four abhiprāya ("hidden intention" or "purpose") refers to the concealed meaning behind the Buddha's statements that were not meant to be taken literally. This concept explains how the Buddha tailored his teachings based on context and the capacities of his audience. According to the Mahāyānasūtrālaṃkāra, there are four types:

1. Intention of sameness (samatābhiprāya): The Buddha equates two things that share an important similarity, such as saying he and the past Buddha Vipaśyin are the same, referring to the identical nature of their dharmakāya (truth body).
2. Intention of something else (arthāntarābhiprāya): The Buddha makes a statement with a deeper meaning. For instance, the Yogācāra school interprets his declaration of the nonexistence of phenomena in the Prajñāpāramitā sūtras as pointing to the three natures (trilakṣaṇa) of phenomena.
3. Intention of another time (kālāntarābhiprāya): The Buddha speaks of an outcome as if it is immediate, though it pertains to the distant future. For example, he assures individuals of rebirth in Amitābha’s paradise (Sukhāvatī) to encourage virtuous action, even if such rebirth might occur later.
4. Intention based on the student's disposition (pudgalāntarābhiprāya): The Buddha adjusts his teachings to suit his audience. For example, he emphasizes charity (dāna) for those inclined toward merit accumulation but downplays it for those overly attached to the practice.

==== The four implied intentions ====
The four abhisaṁdhi (Sanskrit: "implied intention") classifies the Buddha's statements based on their underlying implied intent. The Mahāyānasūtrālaṃkāra identifies four types of abhisaṁdhi:

1. Implied intention of entrance (avatāranābhisaṁdhi): To guide Hīnayāna disciples toward Mahāyāna teachings, the Buddha avoids fully explaining the nonexistence of both the self (anātman) and phenomena (dharmanairātmya). Instead, he first teaches the nonexistence of a personal self while allowing belief in the existence of external phenomena (i.e. emptiness).
2. Implied intention of the three natures (lakṣanābhisaṁdhi): The Buddha’s statements about phenomena reflect their threefold nature. For instance, when he says all phenomena lack inherent existence, he refers to the parikalpita (imaginary) nature; when he says they are neither created nor destroyed, he refers to their paratantra (dependent) nature; and when he says they are inherently free from suffering, he refers to their pariniṣpanna (consummate) nature.
3. Implied intention of antidotes (pratipakṣābhisaṁdhi): The Buddha provides specific antidotes for defilements in Hīnayāna teachings. For example, love counteracts hatred, meditation on impermanence addresses pride, and mindfulness of the breath calms a wandering mind. While these are presented as fully effective, they only achieve complete eradication of defilements with insight into non-self.
4. Implied intention of transformation (pariṇāmanābhisaṁdhi): Some of the Buddha's statements seem paradoxical or contradictory to his teachings. For example, the Dhammapada suggests "killing one’s parents" leads to purity, but this metaphorically refers to eliminating negative mental states like sensual desire.

=== Zhiyi's four criteria ===
According to John R. McRae, the Chinese Tiantai exegete and philosopher Zhiyi (538–597 CE) developed a fourfold hermeneutic criteria for commenting on the Lotus Sutra:

The first three of these criteria concern the relationship between the Buddha and his audience, the doctrinal implications of a given line or term, and the alternative interpretations based on either the ultimate Mahayana doctrines or the more limited Hinayana. Contemplative analysis, the fourth of Chih-i’s categories, is to approach each line of scripture as a function or component of the “contemplation of the principle of the True Characteristic of the One Mind.” For example, Chih-i interprets the term “Vaisali” not as a place name, but as a metaphor for one’s own mind.

A similar way of interpreting Buddhist texts resembling the fourth of these criteria was widely used by the early Zen school, particularly that of the East Mountain Teaching tradition of Shen hsiu (606?–706), and is termed “contemplative analysis” (kuan-hsin shih, or kanjin-shaku in Japanese) by modern scholars.

== See also ==
- Biblical hermeneutics
- Talmudical hermeneutics
- Buddhist philosophy
- Buddhist ethics
- Literary criticism
