= Skandha =

Five aggregates of clinging in Buddhism

Translations of skandha
- English: aggregate, mass, heap, cluster
- Sanskrit: स्कन्ध (skandha)
- Pali: khandha
- Bengali: স্কন্ধ (skåndhå)
- Burmese: ခန္ဓာ (ငါးပါး)။ (MLCTS: kʰàɰ̃dà)
- Chinese: 蘊(T) / 蕴(S) (Pinyin: yùn)
- Indonesian: gugusan, gugus, agregat
- Japanese: 蘊 (Rōmaji: un)
- Khmer: បញ្ចក្ខន្ធ (UNGEGN: pănhchăkkhăn)
- Korean: 온 (RR: on)
- Mongolian: ᠴᠣᠭᠴᠠᠰ (tsogtsas)
- Shan: ၶၼ်ႇထႃႇ ([khan2 thaa2])
- Sinhala: ස්කන්ධ (skandha)
- Tagalog: skandha
- Tibetan: ཕུང་པོ་ (phung po)
- Thai: ขันธ์
- Vietnamese: Ngũ uẩn

Skandhas (Sanskrit) or khandhas (Pāḷi) means 'heaps, aggregates, collections, groupings, clusters'. (Note: The initial part of the Buddhist practice is purification of each of the above "five aggregates" through meditation, study, ritual and living by virtues, particularly abstaining from mental intoxicants. Ultimately, the practice shifts to considering these as naive, then transcending them to reach the state of realization that there is neither person nor self within, or in any other being, states Harvey, where everyone and everything is without self or substantiality and is a "cluster of changing physical and mental processes".) In Buddhism, it refers to the five aggregates of clinging (Pañcupādānakkhandhā), the five material and mental factors that take part in the perpetual process of craving, clinging and aversion due to Avijja.

They are also explained as the five factors that constitute and explain a sentient being's person and personality, but this is a later interpretation in response to Sarvāstivādin essentialism. The 14th Dalai Lama subscribes to this interpretation.

The five aggregates or heaps of clinging are:

1. form, sense objects (or material image, impression) (rūpa)
2. sensations (or feelings of pleasure, pain, or indifference (both bodily and mental), created from the coming together of the senses, sense objects, and the consciousness) (vedanā)
3. perceptions (or the nature of recognizing marks — making distinctions) (saṃjñā, sañña)
4. mental activity, formations, or perpetuations (saṃskāra, saṅkhāra)
5. consciousness (or the nature of knowing) (vijñāna, viññāṇa).

In classical Buddhist doctrine, dukkha ('unease, suffering') arises when one identifies with or clings to the aggregates. This suffering is extinguished by relinquishing attachments to aggregates. All Buddhist traditions hold that the aggregates do not constitute a "self". In Mahayana philosophy, this is further expressed as the aggregates being empty of intrinsic, independent existence.

== Etymology ==
Skandha (Sanskrit: स्कन्ध) is a Sanskrit word that means 'multitude, quantity, aggregate', generally in the context of body, trunk, stem, empirically observed gross object or anything of bulk verifiable with senses. The term appears in the Vedic literature.

The Pali equivalent word Khandha appears extensively in the Pali canon where, state Rhys Davids and William Stede, it means "bulk of the body, aggregate, heap, material collected into bulk" in one context, "all that is comprised under, groupings" in some contexts, and particularly as "the elements or substrata of sensory existence, sensorial aggregates which condition the appearance of life in any form". (Note: According to Dalai Lama, skandha means 'heap, group, collection, or aggregate'.) Paul Williams et al. translate skandha as 'heap, aggregate', stating it refers to the explanation of the psychophysical makeup of any being.

Johannes Bronkhorst renders skandha as 'aggregates'. Damien Keown and Charles Prebish state that skandha is ཕུང་པོ། in Classical Tibetan, and the terms mean 'collections, aggregates, bundles'.

== Description ==
The Buddha teaches in the Pali Canon the five aggregates as follows:

1. "form" or "matter" (Note: In Rawson (1991: p.11), the first skandha is defined as: "name and form (Sanskrit nāma-rūpa, Tibetan gzugs)...". In the Pali literature, nāma-rūpa traditionally refers to the first four aggregates, as opposed to the fifth aggregate, consciousness.) (Skt., Pāli रूप (rūpa); Tib. གཟུགས། (gzugs); Ch. 色 (sè)): matter, body or "material form" of a being or any existence. Buddhist texts state rūpa of any person, sentient being and object to be composed of four basic elements or forces: earth (solidity), water (cohesion), fire (heat) and wind (motion).
2. "sensation" or "feeling" (Skt., Pāli वेदना (vedanā); Tib. ཚོར་བ། (tshor ba); Ch. 受 (shòu)): sensory or hedonic experience of an object. It is either pleasant, unpleasant or neutral. (Note: The Pali canon universally identifies that vedana involves the sensing or feeling of something as pleasant, unpleasant or neutral (see, for instance, SN 22). When contemporary authors elaborate on vedana, they define it similarly (see, for instance, Nhat Hanh, 1999, p. 178; Trungpa, 2001, p. 21; and, Trungpa, 2002, p. 126). The one exception is in Trungpa (1976), pp. 20-23, where he states that the "strategies or impluses" of "indifference, passion and aggression" are "part of the third stage [aggregate]," "guided by perception." (This section of Trungpa, 1976, is anthologized in Trungpa, 1999, pp. 55-58.)) (Note: Generally, vedanā is considered to not include "emotions." For example, Bodhi (2000a), p. 80, writes: "The Pali word vedanā does not signify emotion (which appears to be a complex phenomenon involving a variety of concomitant mental factors), but the bare affective quality of an experience, which may be either pleasant, painful or neutral." Perhaps somewhat similarly, Trungpa (1999), p.58, writes: "Consciousness [the fifth aggregate] consists of emotions and irregular thought patterns....")
3. "perception" (Note: Some translate this term as perception although this is typically the translation of pratyakṣa meaning the apprehension of sensibilia and not any subsequent judgement concerning them. The English word conception is more accurate, although this implies less a process and more the static end result (the mental state of holding a concept)), hence discrimination is preferred.) (Skt. संज्ञा (saṃjñā), Pāli सञ्ञा (saññā), Tib. འདུ་ཤེས། ('du shes); Ch. 想 (xiǎng)): sensory and mental process that registers, recognizes and labels (for instance, the shape of a tree, color green, emotion of fear).
4. "mental formations" (Skt. संस्कार (saṃskāra), Pāli सङ्खार (saṅkhāra), Tib. འདུ་བྱེད། ('du.byed); Ch. 行 (xíng)): "constructing activities", "conditioned things", "volition", "karmic activities"; all types of mental imprints and conditioning triggered by an object. (Note: The Theravada Abhidhamma divides saṅkhāra into fifty mental factors (Bodhi, 2000a, p. 26). Trungpa (2001), pp. 47ff, following the Sarvastivada Abhidharma studied in Mahayana Buddhism, states that there are fifty-one "general types" of samskara.) Includes any process that makes a person initiate action or act.
5. "consciousness" (Skt. विज्ञान (vijñāna), Pāli विञ्ञाण (viññāṇa), Tib. རྣམ་ཤེས། (sna'i rnam par shes pa); Ch. 識 (shí)): "discrimination" or "discernment" (Note: Peter Harvey, The Selfless Mind. Curzon Press 1995, page 143-146.). Awareness of an object and discrimination of its components and aspects, and is of six types, states Peter Harvey. The Buddhist literature discusses this skandha as,
  1. In the Nikayas/Āgamas: cognizance, (Note: In commenting on the use of "consciousness" in SN 22.3 , Bodhi (2000b), pp. 1046-7, n. 18, states: "The passage confirms the privileged status of consciousness among the five aggregates. While all the aggregates are conditioned phenomena marked by the three characteristics, consciousness serves as the connecting thread of personal continuity through the sequence of rebirths.... The other four aggregates serve as the 'stations for consciousness' (vinnanatthitiyo: see [SN] 22:53-54). Even consciousness, however, is not a self-identical entity but a sequence of dependently arisen occasions of cognizing; see MN I 256-60.") that which discerns. (Note: Harvey writes, "This is in contrast to saññā, which knows by grouping things together, labeling them. This contrast can be seen in terms of the typical objects of these states: colours for saññā (S.III.87), but tastes (S.III.87) or feelings (M.I.292) for viññāṇa. While colours usually be immediately identified, tastes and feelings often need careful consideration to properly identify them: discernment and analysis are needed.")
  2. In the Abhidhamma: a series of rapidly changing interconnected discrete acts of cognizance. (Note: This conception of consciousness is found in the Theravada Abhidhamma (Bodhi, 2000a, p. 29).)
  3. In some Mahayana sources: the base that supports all experience. (Note: While not necessarily contradicted by the Nikayas, this is a particularly Mahayana statement. For instance, Nhat Hanh (1999, pp. 180-1) states: "Consciousness here means store consciousness, which is at the base of everything we are, the ground of all of our mental formations." Similarly, Trungpa (2001, pp. 73-4) states that consciousness "is the finally developed state of being that contains all the previous elements.... [C]onsciousness constitutes an immediately available source of occupation for the momentum of the skandhas to feed on.")

== Interpretation ==
=== Aggregates of personality ===
The five aggregates are often interpreted in the later tradition as an explanation of the constituents of person and personality, and "the list of aggregates became extremely important for the later development of the teaching". According to this interpretation, in each skandha – body, sensations, perceptions, mental formations, and consciousness – there is emptiness and no substance.

According to Damien Keown and Charles Prebish, canonical Buddhism asserts that "the notion of a self is unnecessarily superimposed upon five skandha" of a phenomenon or a living being. The skandha doctrine, states Matthew MacKenzie, is a form of anti-realism about everyday reality including persons, and presents an alternative to "substantialist views of the self". It asserts that everything perceived, each person and personality, is an "aggregate, heap" of composite entities without essence.

According to Harvey, the five skandhas give rise to a sense of personality, but are dukkha (unsatisfying), impermanent, and without an enduring self or essence. (Note: Dukkha: The first Noble Truth states that "in brief, the five bundles of grasping-fuel (upadana-skandha) are painful [dukkha]." The five aggregates trigger suffering, pain or unsatisfactoriness. Everything that makes a person is a factor of dukkha, and these in Buddhist thought are not a source of pleasure but of sorrow. Nirvana requires transcendence from all five skandhas and the sense objects. * Impermanent: they come into being and dissolve. * Anatta: each of the skandhas lacks a self and substantiality. The aggregates are appearances which don't have an essence either separately or together, all that is perceived as an aggregate or a whole has no real existence. This is the "non-self" (anatta) doctrine, and it holds that a belief in self is a source of Dukkha (suffering, pain, unsatisfactoriness). The explicit denial of substantiality or essence in any of the five skandha appears in the early Buddhist texts: "All form is comparable to foam; all feelings to bubbles; all sensations are mirage-like; dispositions are like the plantain trunk; consciousness is but an illusion: so did the Buddha illustrate [the nature of the aggregates].") Each aggregate is an object of grasping (clinging), at the root of self-identification as "I, me, myself". According to Harvey, realizing the real nature of skandhas, both in terms of impermanence and non-self, is necessary for nirvana. This "emptiness from personality" can be found in descriptions of the enlightened, perfected state of Arhat and Tathagata, in which there is no longer any identification with the five skandhas. (Note: The physical, the personality factors (skandhas), and any sense of Self or I are a burden which the enlightened individual has dropped, thus becoming a "man of nothing", not clinging to anything internal or external. The perfect state of enlightenment is one without any personality, no "I am" conceit, no physical identification, no intellectual identification, no identification in direct or indirects terms related to any of the five skandhas, because "a tathagata has abandoned the personality factors". No one can find him because he has no "I", self or identity, while his citta expands to infinity; he is beyond the reach of the unenlightened human beings, as well as the army of the Mara (demon of death in Buddhism).)

This "no essence" view has been a topic of questions, disagreements, and commentaries since ancient times, both in non-Buddhist Indian religions and Buddhist traditions. The use of the skandhas concept to explain the self is unique to Buddhism among major Indian religions, and responds to Sarvastivada teachings that "phenomena" or its constituents are real. It also contrasts with the premise of Hinduism and Jainism that a living being has an eternal soul or metaphysical self.

In some early Buddhist texts, the individual is considered unreal but the skandha are considered real. But the skandha too are considered unreal and nonsubstantial in numerous other Buddhist Nikaya and Āgama texts.

=== Aggregates of experience and grasping ===
According to Thanissaro, the Buddha never tried to define what a "person" is, though scholars tend to approach the skandhas as a description of the constituents of the person. He adds that almost any Buddhist meditation teacher explains it that way, as Buddhist commentaries from about the 1st century CE onwards have done. In Thanissaro's view, however, this is incorrect, and he suggests that skandhas should be viewed as activities, which cause suffering, but whose unwholesome workings can be interrupted.

Rupert Gethin also notes that the five skandhas are not merely "the Buddhist analysis of man", but "five aspects of an individual being's experience of the world... encompassing both grasping and all that is grasped". (Note: Gethin: "To explain the khandhas as the Buddhist analysis of man, as has been the tendency of contemporary scholars, may not be incorrect as far as it goes, yet it is to fix upon one facet of the treatment of the khandhas at the expense of others. Thus A. B. Keith could write, “By a division which... has certainly no merit, logical or psychological, the individual is divided into five aggregates or groups.” However, the five khandhas, as treated in the nikāyas and early abhidhamma, do not exactly take on the character of a formal theory of the nature of man. The concern is not so much the presentation of an analysis of man as object, but rather the understanding of the nature of conditioned existence from the point of view of the experiencing subject. Thus at the most general level rūpa, vedanā, sañña, and are presented as five aspects of an individual being's experience of the world; each khandha is seen as representing a complex class of phenomena that is continuously arising and falling away in response to processes of consciousness based on the six spheres of sense. They thus become the five upādānakkhandhas, encompassing both grasping and all that is grasped.")

Mathieu Boisvert states that "many scholars have referred to the five aggregates in their works on Buddhism, [but] none have thoroughly explained their respective functions". According to Boisvert, the five aggregates and dependent origination are closely related, which explains the process that binds us to samsara. Boisvert notes that the pancha-upadanakkhanda(five aggregates of clinging) does not incorporate all human experience. Vedana may transform into either niramisa or nekkhamma-sita vedana (vedana which is not harmful) or into amisa or gehasita vedana (a "type of sensation [which] may act as an agent bringing about the future arising of craving and aversion"). This is determined by sanna. According to Boisvert, "not all sanna belong to the sanna-skandha". The wholesome sanna recognise the three marks of existence (dukkha, anatta, anicca), and do not belong to the sanna-skandha. Unwholesome sanna is not "conducive to insight", and without proper sanna, the "person is likely to generate craving, clinging and becoming". As with sanna, "not all sankhara belong to the sankharaskandha", since not all sankhara produce future effects.

According to Johannes Bronkhorst, the notion that the five aggregates are not self has to be viewed in light of debates about "liberating knowledge", the knowledge of Ātman (eternal soul) which was deemed liberating by the Vedic traditions. Bronkhorst notes that "knowledge of the self plays no useful role on the Buddha's path to liberation". (Note: Bronkhorst: "The aim of the teaching of the Buddha is evidently not to discover the real self. On the contrary, the preoccupation with the true nature of the self has to be given up. Only then one is ready to follow the path shown by the Buddha. Seen from this practical point of view, the question as to the existence of the self is of minor importance. The main thing is that knowledge of the self plays no useful role on the Buddha's path to liberation. As certain non-Buddhist currents asserted a permanent self not subject to change because only knowledge of such a self could be useful to the attainment of liberation, it is probably justified to assume that the Buddha did not accept the existence of such a self.") What is important is not to grasp at the forms, sounds, odors, flavors, objects, and mental properties which are perceived with the six sense organs (these include mind as the sixth sense organ). The insight that the aggregates are not self aids in letting go of this grasping. (Note: Bronkhorst: "Acquiring the insight that the various components of the person are not the self causes a wise and noble listener to turn away from material form, and so on; as a result he becomes free from desire and attains liberation.")

Miri Albahari also objected to the usual understanding of the skandhas as denoting the absence of any "self". Albahari argued that the khandhas do not necessarily constitute the entirety of the human experience, and that the Hindu concept of Ātman is not explicitly negated by Pāli Canon. According to Albani, "anattā is best understood as a practical strategy rather than as a metaphysical doctrine". To Albahari, Nibbāna is an ever-present part of human nature, which is gradually "uncovered" by the cessation of ignorance.

== Eighteen dhātus ==
A related analysis of experience and personality taught in the Buddhist sutras and Abhidharma systems (including Pali Abhidhamma, Vaibhāṣika and Mahayana Abhidharma alongside the five aggregates is the eighteen dhātus (Sanskrit: aṣṭadaśa dhātu, the main "elements" of existence). (Note: The Pāli word dhātu is used in multiple contexts in the Pāli canon: For instance, Bodhi (2000b), pp. 527–28, identifies four different ways that dhātu is used including in terms of the "eighteen elements" and in terms of "the four primary elements" (catudhātu).) These eighteen aspects of experience: six external bases, six internal bases, and six consciousnesses, function through the five aggregates. They are often grouped together with the aggregates into the following grouping: "skandhas, āyatanas and dhātus," which comprises the basic Buddhist Abhidharma analysis of personal identity and experience.

The eighteen elements (aṭṭhārasa dhātuyo) from the internal-external sense bases (āyatana) that condition contact (phassa)
No.	Sense elements (indriya-dhātu)	No.	Object elements (ārammaṇa-dhātu)	No.	Consciousness elements (viññāṇa-dhātu)
1.	eye (cakkhudhātu)	7.	visual form (rūpadhātu)	13.	eye consciousness (cakkhuviññāṇadhātu)
2.	ear (sotadhātu)	8.	sound (saddadhātu)	14.	ear consciousness (sotaviññāṇadhātu)
3.	nose (ghānadhātu)	9	odor/smell (gandhadhātu)	15.	nose consciousness (ghānaviññāṇadhātu)
4.	tongue (jivhādhātu)	10.	taste (rasadhātu)	16.	tongue consciousness (jivhāviññāṇadhātu)
5.	body (kāyadhātu)	11.	touch (phoṭṭhabbadhātu)	17.	body consciousness (kāyaviññāṇadhātu)
6.	mind (manodhātu)	12.	mental object (dhammadhātu)	18.	mind consciousness (manoviññāṇadhātu)

The eighteen elements are the following:

The six sense objects (viṣayadhātu) are:

- visible forms (rūpa-dhātu)
- sounds (śabda-dhātu)
- smells (gandha-dhātu)
- tastes (rasa-dhātu)
- textures (spraṣṭavya-dhātu)
- mental objects (dharma dhātu)

The six sense faculties (indriyadhātu) are:

- eye faculty (cakṣur-dhātu)
- ear faculty (śrotra-dhātu)
- nose faculty (ghrāṇa-dhātu)
- tongue faculty (jihva-dhātu)
- body faculty (kāya-dhātu)
- mental faculty (mano-dhātu)

The six sense consciousnesses (vijñānadhātu) are:

- eye-consciousness (cakṣur-vijñanadhātu)
- ear-consciousness (śrotra-vijñanadhātu)
- nose-consciousness (ghrāṇa-vijñanadhātu)
- tongue-consciousness (jihva-vijñanadhātu)
- body-consciousness (kāya-vijñanadhātu)
- mind-consciousness (mano-vijñanadhātu)

These dhātus can be arranged into six triads, each triad composed of a sense object, a sense organ, and sense consciousness. (Note: The first five sense organs (eye, ear, nose, tongue, body) are derivates of form.; The sixth sense organ (mind) is part of consciousness.; The first five sense objects (visible forms, sound, smell, taste, touch) are also derivatives of form.; The sixth sense object (mental object) includes form, feeling, perception and mental formations.; The six sense consciousnesses are the basis for consciousness.)

== In Theravada Abhidhamma ==
The Five Aggregates (pañcakkhandha)
according to the Pali Canon.

form (rūpa)
4 elements (mahābhūta)
	↓
	contact (phassa)
↓	↑
consciousness (viññāna)

→
←

←

mental factors (cetasika)
feeling (vedanā)
perception (sañña)
formation (saṅkhāra)

- Form is derived from the Four Great Elements.
- Consciousness arises from other aggregates.
- Mental Factors arise from the Contact of
  Consciousness and other aggregates.
- The five aggregates are no-self.

Source: MN 109 (Thanissaro, 2001) | diagram details

The Early Buddhist schools developed detailed analyses and overviews of the teachings found in the sutras, called Abhidharma. Each school developed its own Abhidharma. The best-known is the Theravāda Abhidhamma, but the Sarvāstivāda Abhidharma was historically very influential, and has been preserved partly in the Chinese Āgama.

=== Six sense bases ===
The internal and external sense bases together form the "six sense bases". In this description, found in texts such as Salayatana samyutta, the coming together of an object and a sense-organ results in the arising of the corresponding consciousness.

According to Bhikkhu Bodhi, the Theravada tradition teaches that the six sense bases accommodate "all the factors of existence"; it is "the all", and "apart from which nothing at all exists", and "are empty of a self and of what belongs to the self". (Note: According to Bikkhu Bodhi, the Maha-punnama Sutta, also called The Great Full-moon Night Discourse, describes the impermanence of the aggregates to assert that there is no self, and the right discernment is, "this is not mine, this is not my self, this is not what I am". From Maha-punnama Sutta [Buddha:] "It's possible that a senseless person — immersed in ignorance, overcome with craving — might think that he could outsmart the Teacher's message in this way: 'So — form is not-self, feeling is not-self, perception is not-self, fabrications are not-self, consciousness is not-self. Then what self will be touched by the actions done by what is not-self?' Now, monks, haven't I trained you in counter-questioning with regard to this & that topic here & there? What do you think — Is form constant or inconstant?" "Inconstant, lord." "And is that which is inconstant easeful or stressful?" "Stressful, lord." "And is it fitting to regard what is inconstant, stressful, subject to change as: 'This is mine. This is my self. This is what I am'?" [Monks:] "No, lord." "... Is feeling constant or inconstant?" "Inconstant, lord."... "... Is perception constant or inconstant?" "Inconstant, lord."... "... Are fabrications constant or inconstant?" "Inconstant, lord."... "What do you think, monks — Is consciousness constant or inconstant?" "Inconstant, lord." "And is that which is inconstant easeful or stressful?" "Stressful, lord." "And is it fitting to regard what is inconstant, stressful, subject to change as: 'This is mine. This is my self. This is what I am'?" "No, lord." "Thus, monks, any form whatsoever that is past, future, or present; internal or external; blatant or subtle; common or sublime; far or near: every form is to be seen as it actually is with right discernment as: 'This is not mine. This is not my self. This is not what I am.' – Majjhima Nikaya iii 15, Translated by Thanissaro Bhikkhu)

The suttas do not describe this as an alternative of the skandhas. The Abhidhamma, striving to "a single all-inclusive system", explicitly connects the five aggregates and the six sense bases:

- The first five external sense bases (visible form, sound, smell, taste and touch), and the first five internal sense bases (eye, ear, nose, tongue and body) are part of the form aggregate;
- The mental sense-object (i.e. mental objects) overlap the first four aggregates (form, feeling, perception and formation);
- The mental sense organ (mind) is comparable to the aggregate of consciousness.

Bodhi states that six-sense-bases is a "vertical" view of human experiences while the aggregates is a "horizontal" (temporal) view. The Theravada Buddhist meditation practice on sense bases is aimed at both removing distorted cognitions such as those influenced by cravings, conceits and opinions, as well as "uprooting all conceivings in all its guises".

=== The four paramatthas ===
The Abhidhamma and post-canonical Pali texts create a meta-scheme for the Sutta Pitaka's conceptions of aggregates, sense bases and dhattus (elements). This meta-scheme is known as the four paramatthas or ultimate realities, three conditioned, one unconditioned:

- Material phenomena (rūpa, form)
- Mind or consciousness (citta)
- Mental factors (cetasikas: the nama-factors sensation, perception and formation)
- Nibbāna

=== Twelve Nidanas ===
The 12 Nidānas:
Ignorance
↓
Formations
↓
Consciousness
↓
Name & Form
↓
Six Sense Bases
↓
Contact
↓
Feeling
↓
Craving
↓
Clinging
↓
Becoming
↓
Birth
↓
Old Age & Death

The Twelve Nidanas is a linear list of twelve elements from the Buddhist teachings which arise in dependence on the preceding link. While this list may be interpreted as describing the processes which give rise to rebirth, in essence it describes the arising of dukkha as a psychological process, without the involvement of an atman.

Some scholars regard it to be a later synthesis of several older lists. The first four links may be a mockery of the Vedic-Brahmanic cosmogony, as described in the Hymn of Creation of Veda X, 129 and the Brihadaranyaka Upanishad. These were integrated with a branched list that describes the conditioning of mental processes, akin to the five skandhas. Eventually, this branched list developed into the standard twelvefold chain as a linear list.

According to Boisvert, "the function of each of the aggregates, in their respective order, can be directly correlated with the theory of dependent origination—especially with the eight middle links." Four of the five aggregates are explicitly mentioned in the sequence, yet in a different order than the list of aggregates, which concludes with viññāṇa • vijñāna:

- mental formations (saṅkhāra • saṃskāra) condition consciousness (viññāṇa • vijñāna)
- which conditions name-and-form (nāma-rūpa)
- which conditions the precursors (saḷāyatana, phassa • sparśa) to sensations (vedanā)
- which in turn condition craving (taṇhā • tṛṣṇā) and clinging (upādāna)
- which ultimately lead to the "entire mass of suffering" (kevalassa dukkhakkhandha). (Note: Put another way, it is through the five skandhas that clinging occurs. See, for instance, the Samadhi Sutta (SN 22:5) (Thanissaro, 2006b).)

The interplay between the five-aggregate model of immediate causation and the twelve-nidana model of requisite conditioning is evident, for instance both note the seminal role that mental formations have in both the origination and cessation of suffering. (Note: The apparent distinctions between the nidana model and the khandha model are reduced when, instead of using the twelve-nidana model of the Samyutta Nikaya, chapter 12 (e.g., Thanissaro, 1997d), one compares the nine-nidana model of the Maha-nidana Sutta (DN 15) (Thanissaro, 1997a) where consciousness conditions name-and-form and name-and-form conditions consciousness.) (Note: Bodhi (2000b, pp. 839-840) writes: "Whereas the teaching on dependent origination is intended to disclose the dynamic pattern running through everyday experience that propels the round of rebirth and death forward from life to life, the teaching on the five aggregates concentrates on experience in its lived immediacy in the continuum from birth to death." Perhaps in a similar vein, Bodhi (2000b, pp. 762-3, n. 132) notes elsewhere that, according to the Samyutta Nikaya's subcommentary: "There are two kinds of origin, momentary origin (khanika-samudaya) and origin through conditions (paccaya-samudaya). A bhikkhu who sees one sees the other.")

=== Satipatthana ===
Mindfulness applies to four upassanā (domains or bases), "constantly watching sensory experience in order to prevent the arising of cravings which would power future experience into rebirths," which also overlap with the skandhas. The four domains are:

- mindfulness of the body (kaya); (Note: Salient sections of the Pāli canon on kāya-sati (kāya-gatā-sati): http://www.palikanon.com/english/wtb/g_m/kaaya_gata_sati.htm)
- mindfulness of feelings or sensations (vedanā);
- mindfulness of mind or consciousness (citta); and
- mindfulness of dhammās.

According to Grzegorz Polak, the four upassanā have been misunderstood by the developing Buddhist tradition, including Theravada, to refer to four different foundations. According to Polak, the four upassanā do not refer to four different foundations of which one should be aware, but are an alternate description of the jhanas, describing how the samskharas are tranquilized:

- the six sense-bases which one needs to be aware of (kāyānupassanā);
- contemplation on vedanās, which arise with the contact between the senses and their objects (vedanānupassanā);
- the altered states of mind to which this practice leads (cittānupassanā);
- the development from the five hindrances to the seven factors of enlightenment (dhammānupassanā).

== In the Mahayana tradition ==
The Mahayana developed out of the traditional schools, introducing new texts and putting other emphases in the teachings, especially shunyata and the Bodhisattva-ideal.

=== India ===
The Prajnaparamita-teachings developed from the first century BCE onward. They emphasise the "emptiness" of everything that exists. This means that there are no eternally existing "essences", since everything is dependently originated. The skandhas too are dependently originated, and lack any substantial existence. According to Red Pine, the Prajnaparamita texts are a historical reaction to some early Buddhist Abhidhammas. Specifically, it is a response to Sarvastivada teachings that "phenomena" or their constituents are real. The prajnaparamita notion of "emptiness" is also consistent with the Theravada Abhidhamma.

This is formulated in the Heart Sutra. The Sanskrit version of the "Prajnaparamita Hridaya Sutra" ("Heart Sutra"), which may have been composed in China from Sanskrit texts, and later back-translated into Sanskrit, (Note: According to Nattier (1992), the Heart Sutra was originally composed in Chinese and later back-translated into Sanskrit. Thereafter, it became popular in India and later Tibet. Elements in this translation are not present in Chinese versions of this sutra.) states that the five skandhas are empty of self-existence, (Note: See also Nhat Hanh (1988), p. 1, and Suzuki (1960), p. 26. Nhat Hanh (1988) adds to this first verse the sentence: "After this penetration, he overcame all pain." Suzuki (1960), p. 29, notes that this additional sentence is unique to Hsuan-chuang's translation and is omitted in other versions of the Heart Sutra.) (Note: In the Theravada canon, the English word "self-existence" is a translation of the Sanskrit word svabhava. "Svabhava" has also been translated as "self-nature" (Suzuki, 1960, p. 26), "separate self" (Nhat Hanh, 1988, p. 16) and "self-existence" (Red Pine 2004, p. 67). Note that Chinese versions of the Heart Sutra do not contain the notion of svabhava. When "emptiness of self" is mentioned, the English word "self" is a translation of the Pali word "atta" (Sanskrit, "atman").) (Note: Regarding the term sabhāva (Pali; Skt: svabhāva) in the Pali Canon, Gal (2003), p. 7, writes: "To judge from the suttas, the term sabhāva was never employed by the Buddha and it is rare in the Pali Canon in general. Only in the post-canonical period does it become a standard concept, when it is extensively used in the commentarial descriptions of the dhammas [conditioned mental and physical processes] and in the sub-commentarial exegesis. The term sabhāva, though, does occur on various occasions in five canonical or para-canonical texts: the Paṭisambhidāmagga, the Peṭakopadesa, the Nettippakaraṇa, the Milindapañha and the Buddhavaṃsa." Gal (p. 10) speculates that the use of the term sabhāva in the Paṭisambhidāmagga might be the earliest occurrence in Pali literature and quotes (p. 7, esply. n. 28) from this text (Paṭis. II 178) the application of the phrase sabhāvena suññaṃ (Pali for "empty of sabhāva") to each of the aggregates—at least superficially similar to an application of svabhāva in the Prajnaparamita Hridaya Sutra ("Heart Sutra") cited in this article.) and famously states "form is emptiness, emptiness is form. The same is true with feelings, perceptions, mental formations, and consciousness."

The Madhyamaka school elaborates on the notion of the Middle Way. Its basic text is the Mūlamadhyamakakārikā, written by Nagarjuna, who refuted the Sarvastivada conception of reality, which reifies dhammas. The simultaneous non-reification of the self and reification of the skandhas has been viewed by some Buddhist thinkers as highly problematic.

The Yogacara school further analysed the workings of the mind, elaborated on the concept of nama-rupa and the five skandhas, and developed the notion of the Eight Consciousnesses.

=== China ===
Shunyata, in Chinese texts, is "Wu" (Chinese: 無; pinyin: Wú), nothingness. In these texts, the relation between absolute and relative was a central topic in understanding the Buddhist teachings. The aggregates convey the relative (or conventional) experience of the world by an individual, although Absolute truth is realized through them. Commenting on the Heart Sutra, D.T. Suzuki notes:

When the sutra says that the five Skandhas have the character of emptiness..., the sense is: no limiting qualities are to be attributed to the Absolute; while it is immanent in all concrete and particular objects, it is not in itself definable.

The Tathāgatagarbha Sutras, which concern the Buddha-nature, developed in India but played a prominent role in China. They on occasion speak of the ineffable skandhas of the Buddha (beyond the nature of worldly skandhas and beyond worldly understanding). In the Mahayana Mahaparinirvana Sutra the Buddha tells of how the Buddha's skandhas are in fact eternal and unchanging. The Buddha's skandhas are said to be incomprehensible to unawakened vision.

=== Tibet ===
The Vajrayana tradition further develops the aggregates in terms of mahamudra epistemology and tantric reifications.

Referring to mahamudra teachings, Chogyam Trungpa identifies the form aggregate as the "solidification" of ignorance (Pali, avijjā; Skt., avidyā), allowing one to have the illusion of "possessing" ever dynamic and spacious wisdom (Pali, vijjā; Skt. vidyā), and thus being the basis for the creation of a dualistic relationship between "self" and "other." (Note: This type of analysis of the aggregates (where ignorance conditions the five aggregates) might be akin to that described by the Twelve Nidanas.)

According to Trungpa Rinpoche, the five skandhas are "a set of Buddhist concepts which describe experience as a five-step process" and that "the whole development of the five skandhas... is an attempt on our part to shield ourselves from the truth of our insubstantiality," while "the practice of meditation is to see the transparency of this shield."

Trungpa Rinpoche writes (2001, p. 38):

[S]ome of the details of tantric iconography are developed from abhidharma [that is, in this context, detailed analysis of the aggregates]. Different colors and feelings of this particular consciousness, that particular emotion, are manifested in a particular deity wearing such-and-such a costume, of certain particular colors, holding certain particular sceptres in his hand. Those details are very closely connected with the individualities of particular psychological processes.

== See also ==
- Anatta
- Atman (Buddhism)
- Kosha
- Nagarjuna
- Pratitya-samutpada
- Samsara
- Sankhāra
- Schools of Buddhism
- Shunyata
- Tathagatagarbha doctrine
- Ti-lakkhana

== Sources ==
=== Primary literature ===
Sutta Pitaka

- Bodhi, Bhikkhu (trans.) (2000b), The Connected Discourses of the Buddha: A Translation of the Samyutta Nikaya, Boston: Wisdom Publications, ISBN 978-0-86171-331-8
- Ñāṇamoli, Bhikkhu (trans.) & Bodhi, Bhikkhu (ed.) (2001). The Middle-Length Discourses of the Buddha: A Translation of the Majjhima Nikāya. Boston: Wisdom Publications. ISBN 0-86171-072-X.

Anthologies of suttas

- Bodhi, Bhikkhu (ed.) (2005a). In the Buddha's Words: An Anthology of Discourses from the Pāli Canon. Boston: Wisdom Pubs. ISBN 0-86171-491-1.

Single sutras

- Thanissaro Bhikkhu (trans.) (1998). Culavedalla Sutta: The Shorter Set of Questions-and-Answers [MN 44].
- Thanissaro Bhikkhu (trans.) (2001a). Khajjaniya Sutta: Chewed Up [SN 22.79].
- Thanissaro Bhikkhu (trans.) (2001b). Maha-punnama Sutta: The Great Full-moon Night Discourse [MN 109].

Abhidhamma, Pali commentaries, modern Theravada

- Bodhi, Bhikkhu, ed. (2000a), A Comprehensive Manual of Abhidhamma: The Abhidhammattha Sangaha of Ācariya Anuruddha, Seattle: BPS Pariyatti Edition, ISBN 1-928706-02-9
- Bodhi, Bhikkhu (18 Jan 2005b). MN 10: Satipatthana Sutta (continued) Ninth dharma talk on the Satipatthana Sutta (MP3 audio file).
- Buddhaghosa, Bhadantācariya (trans. from Pāli by Bhikkhu Ñāṇamoli) (1999). The Path of Purification: Visuddhimagga. Seattle, WA: BPS Pariyatti Editions. ISBN 1-928706-00-2.
- Ñāṇamoli, Bhikkhu (trans.) (1998). Mindfulness of Breathing (Ānāpānasati): Buddhist texts from the Pāli Canon and Extracts from the Pāli Commentaries. Kandy, Sri Lanka: Buddhist Publication Society. ISBN 955-24-0167-4.
- Soma Thera (trans.) (2003). The Way of Mindfulness. Kandy, Sri Lanka: Buddhist Publication Society. ISBN 955-24-0256-5.
- Thanissaro Bhikkhu (2002). Five Piles of Bricks: The Khandhas as Burden & Path.

Mahayana

- Fremantle, Francesca & Trungpa, Chõgyam (2003). The Tibetan Book of the Dead: The Great Liberation Through Hearing in the Bardo. Boston: Shambhala Publications. ISBN 1-59030-059-9.
- Nhât Hanh, Thich (1988). The Heart of Understanding: Commentaries on the Prajnaparamita Heart Sutra. Berkeley, CA: Parallax Press. ISBN 0-938077-11-2.
- Nhât Hanh, Thich (1999). The Heart of the Buddha's Teaching. NY: Broadway Books. ISBN 0-7679-0369-2.
- Red Pine (2004). The Heart Sutra. Emeryville, CA: Shoemaker & Hoard. ISBN 1-59376-009-4.
- Suzuki, Daisetz Teitaro (1960). Manual of Zen Buddhism. NY: Grove Press. ISBN 0-8021-3065-8.
- Trungpa, Chögyam (1976). The Myth of Freedom and the Way of Meditation. Boulder: Shambhala. ISBN 0-87773-084-9.
- Trungpa, Chögyam (1999). The Essential Chögyam Trungpa. Boston: Shambhala. ISBN 1-57062-466-6.
- Trungpa, Chögyam (2001). Glimpses of Abhidharma. Boston: Shambhala. ISBN 1-57062-764-9.
- Trungpa, Chögyam (2002). Cutting Through Spiritual Materialism. Boston: Shambhala. ISBN 1-57062-957-9.

=== Secondary literature ===
- Boisvert, Mathieu (1995), The Five Aggregates. Understanding Theravada Psychology and Soteriology, Wilfrid Laurier University Press, for the Canadian Corporation for Studies in Religion / Corporation Canadienne des Sciences Religieuses
- Bronkhorst, Johannes (2009), Buddhist Teaching in India, Wisdom Publications, ISBN 978-0-86171-811-5
- Bucknell, Roderick S. (1999), "Conditioned Arising Evolves: Variation and Change in Textual Accounts of the Paticca-samupadda Doctrine", Journal of the International Association of Buddhist Studies, 22 (2)
- Frauwallner, Erich (1973), "Chapter 5. The Buddha and the Jina", History of Indian Philosophy: The philosophy of the Veda and of the epic. The Buddha and the Jina. The Sāmkhya and the classical Yoga-system, Motilal Banarsidass
- Gal, Noa (July 2003). The Rise of the Concept of ‘Own-Nature’: (Sabhāva) in the Paṭisambhidāmagga [excerpt from Ph.D. thesis]. Oxford: Wolfson College. Retrieved 2008-01-22 from "Oxford Centre for Buddhist Studies" at Internet Archive.
- Gethin, Ruper (1986), "The five khandhas: Their theatment in the nikāyas and early abhidhamma", Journal of Indian Philosophy, 14, doi:10.1007/BF00165825, S2CID 170833425
- Gombrich, Richard (2009), "Chapter 9. Causation and non-random process", What the Buddha Thought, Equinox
- Sue Hamilton. "From the Buddha to Buddhaghosa: Changing Attitudes Toward the Human Body in Theravāda Buddhism." In Religious Reflections on the Human Body, edited by Jane Marie Law. Bloomington and Indianapolis: Indiana University Press, 1995, pp. 46–63.
- Sue Hamilton. Identity and Experience: the Constitution of the Human Being According to Early Buddhism. London: Luzac Oriental,
- Harvey, Peter (2013), An Introduction to Buddhism: Teachings, History and Practices, 2nd Edition, Cambridge University Press, ISBN 978-0-521-85942-41996.
- Jinpa, Thupten (2002). Self, Reality and Reason in Tibetan Philosophy: Tsongkhapa's Quest for the Middle Way. Routledge.
- Jones, Dhivan Thomas (2009), "New Light on the Twelve Nidanas", Contemporary Buddhism, 10 (2), 10 (2): 241–259, doi:10.1080/14639940903239793, S2CID 145413087
- Jurewicz, Joanna (2000), "Playing with Fire: The pratityasamutpada from the perspective of Vedic thought" (PDF), Journal of the Pali Text Society, 26: 77–103, archived from the original (PDF) on 2015-04-09
- Kalupahana, David (1975). Causality: The Central Philosophy of Buddhism. The University Press of Hawaii.
- Kuan, Tse-fu (2008), Mindfulness in Early Buddhism: New Approaches through Psychology and Textual Analysis of Pāli, Chinese and Sanskrit Sources, Routledge, ISBN 978-0-415-43737-0
- Lai, Whalen (2003), Buddhism in China: A Historical Survey. In Antonio S. Cua (ed.): Encyclopedia of Chinese Philosophy (PDF), New York: Routledge, archived from the original on November 12, 2014
- Loy, David (2009), Awareness Bound and Unbound: Buddhist Essays, State University of New York Press, ISBN 978-1-4384-2680-8
- MacKenzie, Matthew (2013), "Enacting the Self: Buddhist and Enactivist Approaches to the Emergence of the Self", in Siderits, Mark; Thompson, Evan; Zahavi, Dan (eds.), Self, No Self?: Perspectives from Analytical, Phenomenological, and Indian Traditions, Oxford University Press, ISBN 978-0-19-166830-2
- Nattier, Jan (1992). "The Heart Sutra: A Chinese Apocryphal Text?" Journal of the International Association of Buddhist Studies, vol. 15, no. 2, pp. 153–223.
- Polak, Grzegorz (2011), Reexamining Jhana: Towards a Critical Reconstruction of Early Buddhist Soteriology, UMCS
- Rawson, Philip (1991). Sacred Tibet. NY: Thames and Hudson. ISBN 0-500-81032-X.
- Ruhe, Brian (2005), Freeing the Buddha, Motilal Banarsidass, ISBN 978-81-208-1835-4
- Schumann, Hans Wolfgang (1997) [1976], Boeddhisme. Stichter, scholen, systemen (Buddhismus - Stifter, Schulen und Systemen), Asoka
- Shulman, Eviatar (2007), "Early Meanings of Dependent-Origination", Journal of Indian Philosophy, 36 (2): 297–317, doi:10.1007/s10781-007-9030-8, S2CID 59132368
- Swanson, Paul L. (1993), The Spirituality of Emptiness in Early chinese Buddhism. In: Buddhist Spirituality. Indian, Southeast Asian, Tibetan, Early Chinese; edited by Takeuchi Yoshinori, New York: Crossroad
- Wayman, Alex (1971), "Buddhist Dependent Origination", History of Religions, 10 (3): 185–203, doi:10.1086/462628, JSTOR 1062009, S2CID 161507469
- Wayman, Alex (1984), "Dependent Origination - the Indo-Tibetan Vision", Buddhist Insight: Essays, Motilal Banarsidass, ISBN 978-81-208-0675-7
- Wayman, Alex (1990), Buddhist Insight. Essays by Alex Wayman, Motilall Banarsidass
  - Wayman, Alex (1990) [1984], "The Intermediate-State Dispute in Buddhism", Buddhist Insight: Essays, Motilal Banarsidass, ISBN 978-81-208-0675-7
- Williams, Paul; Tribe, Anthony (2000), Buddhist Thought, Routledge
