= Katyayana (disambiguation) =

Katyayana may refer to:

- Kātyāyana, an ancient Indian mathematician and Sanskrit grammarian
- Katyayana (Buddhist), a disciple of Gautama Buddha

== See also ==
- Katyayani, a form of the Hindu goddess Durga
