= Paccaya =

Paccaya (a Pali term meaning "condition", "support", "requisite", or "suffix") may refer to:

- Idappaccayatā, the general principle of conditionality or causality in Buddhism
  - Pratītyasamutpāda (dependent origination), the process of conditional origination through the 12 links (nidānas)
- The 24 conditional relations (paccayas) in the Paṭṭhāna, a text of the Pali Abhidhamma
- Catupaccaya (four requisites), the four necessities of life for members of the Sangha (food, robes, shelter, and medicine)
- Suffix or affix (paccaya) in Pali grammar byākaraṇa, added to a root (dhātu)
