= Quasi-canonical texts =

Texts sometimes regarded as being included in the Pāli canon

- Type: Quasi-canonical texts Paracanonical texts Canonical texts (sometimes)
- Parent: Khuddaka Nikāya
- Contains: Nettipakaraṇa, Peṭakopadesa, Milindapañha

"Quasi-canonical texts" is used by Western scholars to refer to various texts on the fringes of the Pali Canon of Theravada Buddhism (cf. Apocrypha), usually to refer to the following texts sometimes regarded as included in the Pali Canon's Khuddaka Nikaya:

- Suttasamgaha (abbrev. "Suttas"; "Sutta Compendium")
- Nettipakarana (abbrev. "Nett"; "Book of Guidance")
- Petakopadesa (abbrev. "Peṭ"; "Instructions on the Tipitaka")
- Milindapañha (abbrev. "Mil"; "Questions of Milinda")

The Suttasamgaha includes selected texts primarily from the Pali Canon. The Nettipakarana and the Petakopadesa are introductions to the teachings of Buddhism; these books present methods of interpretation that lead to the knowledge of the good law (saddhamma). Milindapañhā, written in the style of the Pali suttas, contains a dialogue between the Indo-Greek king Menander (in Pāli, Milinda) and the Thera Nāgasena, which illuminates certain important tenets of Buddhism.

Other terms with similar meanings include "semi-canonical" .

== History ==
The Suttasamgaha is believed to have been composed in Anurādhapura, Sri Lanka.

In Burma, presumably sometime after the closing of the Abhidhamma Pitaka (ca. 200 CE), the quasicanonical texts were added to the Khuddaka Nikaya.

The Suttasamgaha was included in the 1888 Burmese Piṭakat Samuiṅ, but excluded from the 1956 Burmese Chaṭṭasaṅgāyana edition possibly due to the Suttasamgaha's inclusion of material from the post-canonical Pali commentaries. The Burmese Fifth Council inscriptions of the Canon include the same three works. The Burmese Phayre manuscript of the Canon, dated 1841/2, includes the Netti.

The Nettipakarana, Petakopadesa and Milindapañha appear in the Khuddaka Nikaya of the Burmese Tipitaka, while the Nettipakarana and the Petakopadesa appear in the Sinhalese printed edition.

The head of the Burmese sangha two centuries ago regarded at least the Netti and Petakopadesa as canonical. A modern Burmese teacher has described them as post-canonical.

== See also ==
- Tipitaka
- Khuddaka Nikaya
- Anupitaka

== Sources ==
- Hinüber, Oskar von (1996; pbk. ed. 2000). A Handbook of Pāli Literature. Berlin: Walter de Gruyter. ISBN 3-11-014992-3.
- Malalasekera, G.P. (1937–38). Dictionary of Pāli Proper Names . Pali Text Society. Retrieved 2008-07-11 from "What the Buddha said in plain English!" at http://what-buddha-said.net/library/DPPN/index_dict.ppn.htm.
