= Kaccānagotta Sutta =

Buddhist text in the Pali Canon

The Kaccānagotta Sutta is a short, but influential Buddhist text in the Pali Canon (Saṃyutta Nikāya 12.15).

A Sanskrit and Chinese (Saṃyuktāgama 301; also a partial quotation in SĀ 262) parallel text is also extant. Although there is considerable agreement across versions, the Sanskrit and Chinese texts are more or less identical to each other and both slightly different from the Pāli version.

The Chinese translation was carried out by Baoyun based on a text read out by Guṇabhadra (c. 435-443 CE) as part of a Samyuktāgama (雜阿含經) translation project. The Sanskrit text had been brought by Faxian to China from Sri Lanka.

The text is cited in Sanskrit in works by Nāgārjuna and his commentators. Nāgārjuna's citation suggests he had a different version from the extant Sanskrit. The text is also cited in a number of other Mahāyāna Sūtras.

== Themes in the Text ==
Mahākaccāna asks about the meaning of the phrase "right-view" (Pali: sammādiṭṭhi; Skt: samyagdṛṣṭi; Ch: 正見).

The main theme of the text is the avoidance of the extremes "existence" (Pāli: atthi) and "non-existence" (Pāli: natthi) with respect to the world (Pāli: loka), and instead seeing the world in terms of the Middle Way which is illustrated by the twelve nidānas. The one with right-view understands this.

In the Chinese version, the terms "existence" and "non-existence" are rendered 有 (yǒu) and 無 (wú). The Sanskrit text uses the terms asti and nāsti. Nāgārjuna's Sanskrit citation uses the same words.

The question of existence and non-existence is discussed in the context of right-view (sammādiṭṭhi) with Mahākaccāna initially asking the Buddha to define right view for him.

Kaccāna is a moderately prominent character in the Pāli Canon, and two canonical commentaries are attributed to him.

== Sources ==
=== Primary ===
- Pāli: Saṃyutta Nikāya (SN 12.15, PTS iii.16-17); also cited in toto in the Channa Sutta (SN 22.90).
- Sanskrit: Sūtra 19 of Nidānasaṃyukta, in a Saṃyuktāgama collection found in Turfan.
- Chinese: Saṃyuktāgama 301 (T. 2.99 85a-86c), probably translated from a Sanskrit original; also partially cited in Saṃyuktāgama 262 (T. 2.99 66c01-c18 = SN 22.90).

=== Secondary ===
The sutta is quoted in the Laṅkāvatāra Sūtra (Section LXII; p. 145). It is also cited in Sanskrit in Nāgārjuna's Mūlamadhyamakakārika (MMK 15.7) and in commentaries on this work by Candrakīrti, namely Prassanapadā and Madhyamakāvatārabhāṣya.

As the only text cited by name in MMK it is pointed to as evidence that Nāgarjuna might not have been a Mahāyānist. David Kalupahana has referred to the MMK as "a commentary on the Kaccānagotta Sutta".

== English Translations ==
=== From Pāli ===
- Access to Insight: Thanissaro, Walsh.
- Jayarava. Kaccānagotta Sutta (SN 12.15, PTS S ii.16.) along with Buddhaghosa’s commentary (PTS SA ii.32).

=== From Chinese ===
- Choong Mun-keat & Piya Tan (2004) ‘Saṃyukta Āgama 301 = Taishō 2.99.85c-86a’. Dharmafarer . (pages numbered 89-91)
- Jayarava. Kātyāyana Gotra Sūtra.
- LapisLazuli Translations - Wikisource

== External sources ==
- Kalupahana, David J. (1986). Nāgārjuna: The Philosophy of the Middle Way. State University of New York Press.
- Li, Shenghai. Candrakīrti’s Āgama: A Study of the Concept and Uses of Scripture in Classical Indian Buddhism. [PhD Thesis]. 2012.
- Mattia Salvini. 'The Nidānasamyukta and the Mūlamadhyamakakārikā: understanding the Middle Way through comparison and exegesis.' Thai International Journal of Buddhist Studies II (2011): 57-95.
- Tripāṭhī, Chandra. (Ed.). 'Fünfundzwanzig Sūtras Des Nidānasaṃyukta' in Sanskrittexte aus den Turfanfunden (Vol. VIII). Edited by Ernst Waldschmidt. Berlin: Akademie-Verlag, 1962. [Includes translation into German]
- Vaidya, P. L. Saddharma-laṅkāvatāra Sūtram. The Mithila Institute of Post-Graduate Studies and Research in Sanskrit Learning. Darbhanga. 1963.

== See also ==
- Buddhist texts
