= Milinda Panha =

Buddhist text dated between 100 BCE and 200 CE

- SuttaCentral; OpenTipitaka
- Type: Canonical text Quasicanonical text Paracanonical text
- Parent: Khuddaka Nikāya
- Attribution: Nāgasena; Bhāṇaka
- Abbreviation: Mil

The Milindapañhā (lit. 'Questions of Milinda') is a Buddhist text which dates from sometime between 100 BC and 200 AD. It purports to record a dialogue between the Indian Buddhist sage Nāgasena, and the 2nd century BC Indo-Greek king Menander I (Pāli: Milinda).

The Milindapañhā is regarded as canonical in Burmese Buddhism, included as part of the book of Khuddaka Nikāya. An abridged version is included as part of Chinese Mahāyāna translations of the canon. The Milindapañhā is not regarded as canonical by Thai or Sri Lankan Buddhism, however, despite the surviving Theravāda text being in Sinhalese script.

The Chinese text titled "Monk Nāgasena Sutra" corresponds to the first three chapters of the Milindapañhā. It was translated sometime during the Eastern Jin dynasty (317–420).

== History ==
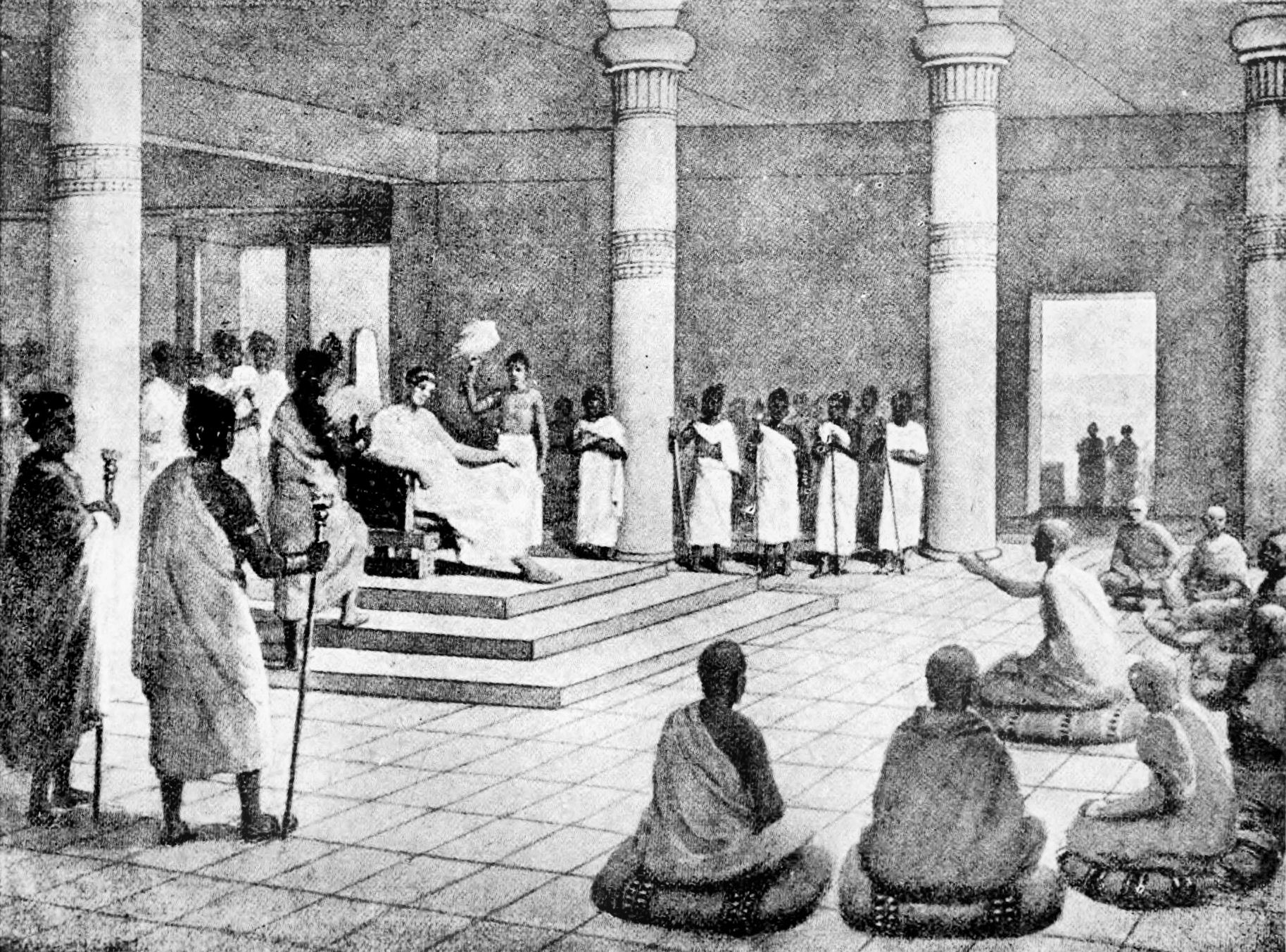
King Milinda asks questions.

It is generally accepted by scholars that the work is composite, with additions made over some time. In support of this, it is noted that the Chinese versions of the work are substantially shorter.

The earliest part of the text is believed to have been written between 100 BC and 200 AD. The text may have initially been written in Sanskrit; Oskar von Hinüber suggests, based on an extant Chinese translation of Mil as well as some unique conceptualizations within the text, that the text's original language might have been Gandhari. However, apart from the Sri Lankan Pali edition and its derivatives, no other copies are known.

The oldest manuscript of the Pāli text was copied in 1495 AD. Based on references within the text itself, significant sections of the text are lost, making Milinda the only Pāli text known to have been passed down as incomplete.

It is mentioned in the Grande Inscription d'Angkor engraved in 1701 on the walls of Angkor Wat in Cambodia.

The book is included in the inscriptions of the Canon approved by the Burmese Fifth Council and the printed edition of the Sixth Council text.

Thomas Rhys Davids says it is the greatest work of classical Indian prose, saying:

"[T]he 'Questions of Milinda' is undoubtedly the masterpiece of Indian prose, and indeed is the best book of its class, from a literary point of view, that had then been produced in any country."

Moriz Winternitz however maintains that this is true only of the earlier parts.

== Contents ==
The contents of the Milindapañhā are:

1. Background History
2. Questions on Distinguishing Characteristics: (Characteristics of Attention and Wisdom, Characteristic of Wisdom, Characteristic of Contact, Characteristic of Feeling, Characteristic of Perception, Characteristic of Volition, Characteristic of Consciousness, Characteristic of Applied Thought, Characteristic of Sustained Thought, etc.)
3. Questions for the Cutting Off of Perplexity: (Transmigration and Rebirth, The Soul, Non-Release From Evil Deeds, Simultaneous Arising in Different Places, Doing Evil Knowingly and Unknowingly, etc.)
4. Questions on Dilemmas : Speaks of several puzzles and these puzzles were distributed in eighty-two dilemmas.
5. A Question Solved By Inference
6. Discusses the Special Qualities of Asceticism
7. Questions on Talk of Similes

According to Oskar von Hinüber, while King Menander is an actual historical figure, Bhikkhu Nāgasena is otherwise unknown, the text includes anachronisms, and the dialogue lacks any sign of Greek influence but instead is traceable to the Upanisads.

The text mentions Nāgasena's father Soñuttara, his teachers Rohana, Assagutta of Vattaniya and Dhammarakkhita of Asoka Ārāma near Pātaliputta, and another teacher named Āyupāla from Sankheyya near Sāgala.

== Menander I ==
According to the Milindapañhā, Milinda/Menander, identified as Menander I, embraced the Buddhist faith. He is described as constantly accompanied by a guard of 500 Greek (Yonaka) soldiers, and two of his counselors are named Demetrius and Antiochus.

In the Milindapañhā, Menander is introduced as the "king of the city of Sāgala in India, Milinda by name, learned, eloquent, wise, and able". Buddhist tradition relates that, following his discussions with Nāgasena, Menander adopted the Buddhist faith "as long as life shall last" and then handed over his kingdom to his son to retire from the world. It is described that he attained enlightenment afterwards.

== Translations ==
The work has been translated into English three times, once in 1890 by Thomas William Rhys Davids (reprinted by Dover Publications in 1963); once in 1969 by Isaline Blew Horner (reprinted in 1990 by the Pali Text Society); and most recently in 2025 by Maria Heim (Murty Classical Library of India).

- Questions of King Milinda. Sacred Books of the East. Vol. XXXV & XXXVI. Translated by Rhys Davids, T.W. Oxford: Clarendon. 1890–94.; reprinted by Motilal Banarsidass, Delhi Vol. 1, Vol. 2
- Milinda's Questions. Translated by Horner, I.B. Bristol: Pali Text Society. 1963–64. 2 volumes.
- The Questions of Milinda. Translated by Heim, Maria. Cambridge: Harvard University Press. 2025.

Abridgements include:

- Pesala, Bhikkhu, ed. (1992). The Debate of King Milinda: An Abridgement of the Milinda Pañha. Delhi: Motilal Banarsidass. Based on Rhys Davids (1890, 1894).
- Mendis, N.K.G., ed. (2001) [1993]. The Questions of King Milinda: An Abridgement of the Milindapañhā. Kandy, Sri Lanka: Buddhist Publication Society. Based on Horner (1963–64).

A Chinese counterpart of the Milindapañhā has been translated into English by Bhikkhu Anālayo and published by Bukkyo Dendo Kyokai.

== See also ==
- Anatta, doctrine of "non-self"
- Anupiṭaka
- Greco-Buddhism
- Greco-Buddhist monasticism
- Khuddaka Nikāya
- Mahāvaṃsa
- Paracanonical texts (Theravada Buddhism)

== Additional Sources ==
- Gardner, Percy; Poole, Reginald Stuart (1886). The coins of the Greek and Scythic kings of Bactria and India in the British Museum. London: British Museum.
