= Postcanonical texts =

Post-canonical texts, also known as paracanonical texts, non-canonical texts, and extra-canonical texts, refer to collected non-canonical or extra-canonical Pāli literature of Buddhism. These texts are considered as important supplements or complements to the core teachings contained in the Tipitaka. The paracanonical texts can be regarded as falling into three historical periods. The first ("classical") period stretches from about the 3rd century BC to about the 5th century AD. The second ("commentarial") period extends from the 5th century to the 11th century, and the third ("modern") period begins with the 12th century.

== History and development ==
In the centuries following the Buddha's passing and the convening of the First Buddhist Council, arahats and scholar monks began to compile their own commentaries, explanations, elaborations, meditation notes, and historical records related to the teachings of the Tipitaka. Initially, these materials were passed down orally within the monastic sangha. Similar to the Tipitaka, many of these texts began to be written down around the turn of the Common Era. Most of these early texts were written in the Sinhala language and were stored in forest monasteries and temples in Sri Lanka, thus limiting their access only to Sinhala scholars. This literature only became widely available to the Theravāda world after these scattered fragments were translated into the Pāli language and compiled into coherent texts. This codification effort was primarily undertaken by the great Indian scholar, Buddhaghosa, in the 5th century CE.

== Quasi-canonical texts ==
The quasi-canonical texts refer to the literature of the first period consist of some classical works of which only a few now survive, sometimes regarded as included in the Khuddaka Nikāya. To this period belongs:

- Nettipakarana (the book of guidance)
- Petakopadesa (Instruction on the Tipitaka)
- Milindapañha (The questions of Milinda)

The Nettipakarana and Petakopadesa are introductions to the teachings of Buddhism. These books present methods of interpretation, means exposition of that which leads to the knowledge of the good law. Petakopadesa is the 'Instruction on the Tipitaka'. The source material derives directly from the Sutta pitaka. Milindapañhā, written in the style of suttas, contains a dialogue between the Indo-Greek king Menander (in Pāli, Milinda) and the Thera Nāgasena, which throws a flood of light on certain important points of Buddhism.

These three books appear in the Khuddaka Nikaya of the Burmese Tipitaka, while the first two appear in the Sinhalese printed edition.

== See also ==
- Pali Canon
- Atthakatha
- Khuddaka Nikaya
- List of Pali Canon anthologies
- Pali literature
- Subcommentaries, Theravada

== Sources ==
- Matthews, Bruce (1995). "Post-Classical Developments in the Concepts of Karma and Rebirth in Theravāda Buddhism," in Ronald W. Neufeldt (ed.), Karma and Rebirth: Post-Classical Developments. Delhi, Sri Satguru Publications. (Originally published by the State University of New York, 1986). ISBN 81-7030-430-X.
