= Aggavamsa =

Ancient Pali grammarian

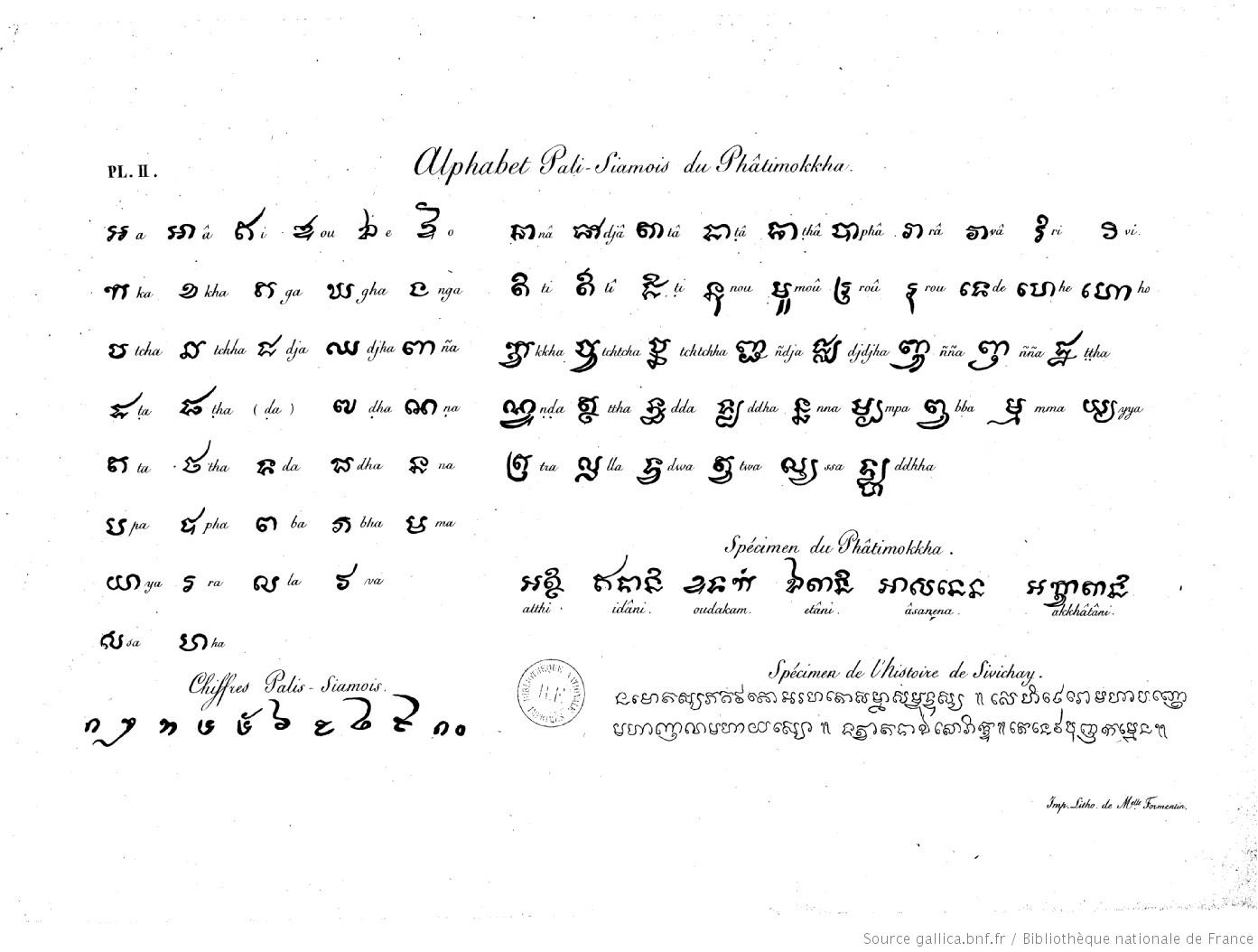
pali language

Aggavaṃsa of Arimaddana (modern Bagan, Burma) was the author of the Saddanīti, a grammar of the Pāli language (byākaraṇa), specifically the text of the Buddhist scriptures, the Tipiṭaka. The work was completed in 1154 CE and was taken to Laṅka (Ceylon) a few years after its completion.

His work can be seen as a descriptive grammatical work. It consists of 28 chapters with the first 19 being entitled Mahāsaddanīti (The Greater Guidance of Sadda) and the remaining 9 chapters being called Cullasaddanīti (The Lesser Guidance of Sadda). The Mahāsaddanīti is in two sections: the Padamālā(1-14), which deals with morphological and syntactic patterns of Pāli and the Dhātumālā(1-14), which gives a full lexicographical account of Pāli roots in eight gaṇas. The Cullasaddanīti is tantamount to the Suttamālā. It is made up of 1347 suttas, accompanied by an additional chapter on upasaggas and nipātas.

== Links ==
1. Aggavaṃsa's grammar: Padamālā Pariccheda I – XIV
2. Aggavaṃsa's grammar: Suttamālā Pariccheda XX – XXVIII
