= Nettipakaraṇa =

- SuttaCentral; OpenTipitaka
- Type: Canonical text Quasicanonical text Paracanonical text
- Parent: Khuddaka Nikāya
- Attribution: Mahākaccāna; Bhāṇaka
- Aṭṭhakathā: Nettipakaraṇa-aṭṭhakathā
- Commentator: Dhammapāla
- Ṭīkā: Nettipakaraṇaṭīkā; Nettivibhāvinī
- Abbreviation: Ne; Nett; Netti

The Nettipakaraṇa (Pali, also called Nettippakarana, abbreviated Netti) is a Buddhist scripture, sometimes included in the Khuddaka Nikaya of Theravada Buddhism's Pali Canon. The main theme of this text is Buddhist Hermeneutics through a systematization of the Buddha's teachings. It is regarded as canonical by the Burmese Theravada tradition, but isn't included in other Theravada canons.

== Origins and Dating ==
The nature of the Nettipakarana was a matter of some disagreement among scholars. Initially, Western scholars classified it as a commentary, rather than as a canonical text. Further study and comparison with a closely related text, the Petakopadesa eventually revealed that it was a guide to interpretation and the composition of definitive commentaries.

Its translator, supported by Professor George Bond of Northwestern University, described it is a guide to help those who already understand the teaching present it to others. However, A. K. Warder disagreed, maintaining that it covers all aspects of interpretation, not just this. Consensus among contemporary scholars is that it was primarily intended as a guide to interpreting and providing explanation of canonical texts, similar to the Petakopadesa, whose content it resembles.

Verses in the Nettipakarana composed in a poetic meter unknown in Sri Lanka suggest a northern Indian origin for the text that predates the Christian era. It is one of the few post-canonical texts composed in Pāli that predates the work of Buddhaghosa, who quotes from it and uses its methods and technical terms in his own commentaries. The structure of the text- where the later verses are constructed as commentaries on a summary verse- became popular in the first centuries CE, while the āryā meter used for its verses was already being used for such verses around 150 BCE.

The Nettipakarana is ascribed to the Buddha's disciple Kaccana by the text's colophon, introductory verses, and the commentary attributed to Dhammapala. The text's colophon says he composed the book, that it was approved by the Buddha and that it was recited at the First Council. Scholars do not take this literally, but the translator admits the methods may go back to him. The translator holds that the book is a revised edition of the Petakopadesa, though this has been questioned by Professor von Hinüber. K.R. Norman concludes that the Nettipakarana is not a continuation of the Petakopadesa, but a rewritten version that eliminates unimportant content and provides improved and clarified versions of material shared by both sources. Dhammapala composed a commentary on the Nettipakarana, the Nettipakarana-atthakatha, but not the Petakopadesa, a fact that K.R. Norman attributes to the Nettipakarana superseding the older text.

Both the use of āryā meter and summary verses suggest a North Indian origin for the text, possibly Ujjain, where Buddhist tradition connects the name Mahākaccāna to Avanti, the region suggested as the origin of the Pāli texts brought to Sri Lanka. The text contains quotations from sources outside the Theravada canon, some of which have been traced to texts from the Mulasarvastivada canon. Other quotations are as yet unidentified, but suggest that the Nettipakarana is unusual for being a text drawn from beyond the Theravada tradition that influenced the composition of the definitive commentaries composed by Buddhaghosa.

The Nettipakarana was regarded as canonical by the head of the Burmese sangha around two centuries ago, and included in the Khuddaka Nikaya. It is included in the Burmese Phayre manuscript of the Canon, dated 1841/2, the inscriptions of the Canon approved by the Burmese Fifth Council, the 1956 printed edition of the Sixth Council, the new transcript of the Council text being produced under the patronage of the Supreme Patriarch of Thailand and the Sinhalese Buddha Jayanti edition of the Canon. A recent Burmese teacher has not regarded it as canonical.

== Structure and Content ==
The Nettipakarana is divided into two divisions (vāra):

- Sangahavāra: 'Summary', a short section consisting of only five verses that identifies its author as 'Mahakaccāna'.
- Vibhāgavāra: 'Explanations', which is divided into three sub-sections:
  - Uddesavāra ('Specification Section')
  - Niddesavāra ('Demonstrative Section')
  - Patiniddesavāra ('Counter-demonstrative Section')

=== Uddesavāra ===
The Uddesavāra enumerates three separate categories (Pali terms with Nanamoli's translations):

- The sixteen hāras (conveyings, or modes of conveying) are : Desanā (teaching), vicaya (investigation), yutti (construing), Padatthāna (footings), Lakkhana (characteristics), Catuvyūha (fourfold array), Āvatta (conversion), Vibhatti (analysis), Parivattana (reversal), Vevacana (synonyms), Paññatti (descriptions), otarana (ways of entry), sodhana (clearing up), adhitthāna (terms of expression), parikkhāra (requisites), and samāropana (co-ordination).
- The five naya (guidelines) are : Nandiyāvatta (conversion of relishing); tipukkhala (trefoil); sīhavikkīlita (play of lions); disālocana (plotting of directions); ankusa (the hook).
- The eighteen mūlapadas consist of nine Kusala and nine akusala.
  - Akusala: Tanhā (craving), avijja (Ignorance), Lobha (greed), Dosa (Hatred), Moha (Delusion), Subha saññā (perception of attractiveness), Nicca saññā (perception of permanence), Sukha saññā (perception of pleasant). Attasaññā (perception of self)
  - Kusala: samatha (calming of mind), vipassanā (insight), alobha (non-greed), adosa (non-hatred), amoha (non-delusion), asubhasaññā (perception of unattractiveness), Dukkhasaññā (perception of stress), Aniccasaññā (perception of impermanence), and Anattasaññā (perception of non-self)

=== Niddesavāra ===
The Niddesavāra repeats the hāras and nayas of the previous section along with 12 padas ('terms'), of which six refer to linguistic forms and six to meaning and describes their relations.

=== Patiniddesavāra ===
The Patiniddesavāra forms the main body of the text and is itself divided into three parts. Each section illustrates technical terms from previous sections by quoting the verses that contain them and illustrating them with quotations from the Sutta Pitaka. In some cases, terms are dealt with in a different order or using different terminology from that presented in previous chapters. A colophon at the end of the text again attributes it to Mahākaccāna.

== Editions, Translations and Commentaries ==
The Sri Lankan scholar Dhammapala wrote a commentary on this text in the fifth century. An English translation titled The Guide by Bhikkhu Nanamoli was published in 1962 by the Pali Text Society.

A Pali Text Society edition of the Pali text, together with extracts from Dhammapala's commentary, was published in 1902 by Edmund Hardy.
