= Peṭakopadesa =

Buddhist scripture in the Pali Canon

- SuttaCentral; OpenTipitaka
- Type: Canonical text Quasicanonical text Paracanonical text
- Parent: Khuddaka Nikāya
- Attribution: Mahākaccāna; Bhāṇaka
- Abbreviation: Pe; Peṭ

The Petakopadesa (peṭakopadesa) is a Buddhist scripture, sometimes included in the Khuddaka Nikaya of the Pali Canon of Theravada Buddhism.

== History ==
=== Origin ===
The nature of this book is a matter of some disagreement among scholars. The translator, supported by Professor George Bond of Northwestern University, holds it is a guide to those who understand the teaching in presenting it to others. However, A. K. Warder, Professor Emeritus of Sanskrit in the University of Toronto, maintains that it covers all aspects of interpretation, not just that.

The text is often connected to another para-canonical text, the Nettipakaraṇa. Oskar von Hinüber suggests that both of these texts originated from outside the Theravada tradition as handbooks on the interpretation of the sutras.

According to the chapter colophons, the book was composed by the Buddha's disciple Kaccana (or Kaccayana). Scholars do not take this literally, though the translator mentions that the methods may go back to him.

=== As a commentary ===
Warder, in his examination of the Paṭisambhidāmagga Gaṇṭhipada in the Introduction to the Path of Discrimination, notes: “The Gaṇṭhipada (p. 106), however, provides the positive information that this Peṭaka is a book of the Mahiṃsāsakas, an aṭṭhakathā ("commentary") made for the purpose of the Suttantapiṭaka. This implies that it was a work similar to the Peṭakopadesa … Thus both schools had a recension of this work, but differing in such details as this. …”. The passage in the Gaṇṭhipada is Suttante piṭakatthāya kataṭṭhakathā peṭakaṃ mahiṃsakānaṃ gantho.

=== As a canonical text ===
This book was regarded as canonical by the head of the Burmese sangha about two centuries ago. It is included in the inscriptions of the Canon approved by the Burmese Fifth Council and in the printed edition of the Sixth Council text.

=== Parallels ===
Stefano Zacchetti revealed that in the Chinese Canon there is a text called Yin chi rujing, translated in the 3d century, which corresponds to most of the sixth chapter of the Pali Peṭakopadesa. Then there is another Chinese text, the Da zhidu lun, which mentions the Peṭaka as a text circulating in South India (presumably Kāñcipura and Sri Lanka) and that it is an abridged version of an originally larger text. It describes a few of the methods of the Peṭaka and gives examples which roughly correspond to passages in the Peṭaka. Thus it appears that the Peṭakopadesa was circulating in different schools and in different versions.

== Sections ==
There are 8 sections as follows:

1. Ariyasacca Pakasana (display of the Noble Truths)
2. Sāsana patthāna (pattern of the dispensation)
3. Suttādhitthāna (terms of expression in the thread)
4. Suttavicaya (investigation of threads)
5. Hāravibhanga (modes of conveying in separate treatment)
6. Suttatthasamuccaya (compendium of the thread's meaning)
7. Hārasampāta (modes of conveying in combined treatment)
8. Sutta vibhangiya (Analyses of Suttas)

However, the translator says this last title is a mistake for "moulding of the guidelines", the title given at the end.

== Translations ==
Pitaka-Disclosure, tr. Nanamoli Bhikkhu, 1964, Pali Text Society, Bristol

== See also ==
- Paracanonical texts (Theravada Buddhism)
- Nettipakarana
