= Kātyāyana (Buddhist) =

Leading disciple of Gautama Buddha

Mahākatyāyana
- Title: Sankhittēna bhāsitassa vitthārēna attha vibhajantānan (Pāli; lit. "Foremost of those presenting the detailed meaning of what is spoken in brief")

Personal life
- Born: Ujjain, Avanti
- Parent(s): Tirītavaccha (father), Candapadumā (mother)
- Occupation: monk

Religious life
- Religion: Buddhism
- Dharma name: Mahākatyāyana (Sanskrit); Mahākaccāyana (Pali)

Senior posting
- Teacher: Gautama Buddha
- Students: (Pali) Soṇakuṭikaṇṇa Isidatta Avantiputta Lohicca Arāmadanda Kandarāyana

Translations of Kātyāyana
- Sanskrit: Kātyāyana
- Pali: Kaccāyana
- Sinhala: මහාකච්චායන (Mahākaccāyana)
- Vietnamese: Ca Chiên Diên

Kātyāyana or Mahākātyāyana (Sanskrit; Pali: Kaccāyana, sometimes shortened to Kaccāna; also Mahākaccāna, or Mahākaccāyana) was a disciple of Gautama Buddha. He is listed as one of the ten principal disciples and was foremost in expanding on and explaining brief statements of the Buddha.

In Thai Buddhism, he is also known as Phra Sangkajai and often portrayed as extremely portly.

== Accounts ==
=== Meeting the Buddha ===
In the Pāli tradition, Kātyāyana was born as Nalaka (Sanskrit: Nālaka), born of a Brahmin family in the city of Ujjayini (Pali: Ujjenī, modern-day Ujjain). His father was appointed as an advisor to King Candapradyota, ruler of the state of Avanti. (Note: For the first name, the city and the position of the father, see Malalasekera (1937, Nalaka; Ujjenī; Tirītavaccha). For the name of the king, see Buswell & Lopez (2014, Mahākātyāyana).) His name is explained by the golden hue of his skin (his parents called him Kañcanamānava, meaning the 'young man with golden colored skin' After his father died, Kātyāyana became an advisor to the same king. At the king's request, Kātyāyana left with a group of seven friends to visit the Buddha to invite him to come to Avanti. The eight friends gained enlightenment while listening to him preach, and were ordained by the Buddha. As a monk, Kātyāyana became known by his gotra name.

Nāgārjuna cites a text which he calls the Kātyāyanavavāda ("Advice to Kātyāyana") in his Mūlamadhyamakakārikā (15.7). This text appears to have been a Sanskrit parallel of the Pāli Kaccānagotta Sutta.

=== Soreyya ===
There is a famous incident given in Verse 43 of the Dhammapada commentary in which a man named Soreyya was traveling with a friend and happened to see Kātyāyana adjusting his robes. Upon seeing his golden complexion, Soreyya began to fantasize that Kātyāyana should become his wife or that his wife's complexion should be like that of Kātyāyana. Due to the nature of this thought, he transformed into a woman. He married a wealthy man from Taxila and bore him two sons.

Soreyya later approached Kātyāyana and explained the situation, apologizing for his misconduct in thought. Kātyāyana accepted his apology, upon which Soreyya regained his male form.

=== Vassakāra ===
Another story relates the incident of a man named Vassakāra, minister of King Ajātasattu. Upon seeing Kātyāyana descend from a mountain, the minister stated that he looked like a monkey. The Buddha advised the minister that he should ask Kātyāyana for forgiveness, lest he would be reborn as a monkey in the Veṇuvana forest. Vassakāra was certain that he would be reborn as a monkey, though, and as a precaution, he supplied that area with fruit and other trees. After death, he was reborn as the Buddha had predicted.

=== Past lives ===
In the lifetime of Padumuttara Buddha, Kātyāyana made the resolve to attain greatness after hearing the praise of another monk that shared his name. In this life, he was a vidyādhara and offered the Buddha three kanikāra flowers. After building a hut in the shape of a lotus and naming it Paduma (Pali; lit. "lotus"), he became a king named Pabhassara after thirty kalpas.

It is also mentioned that he was a vidyādhara in the time of Sumedha Buddha.

In the time of Kāśyapa Buddha he was a householder of Benares. He offered a golden brick to a caitiya that housed the Buddha's remains, and made a vow that in the future his body would have a golden complexion.

== Propagation of Buddhism ==
Instead of the Buddha himself, the newly ordained and enlightened Kātyāyana returned to Avanti to teach King Candapajjota. The king was highly pleased with his attainments. He provided a royal park for Kātyāyana to live and treated him with great honor. Kātyāyana made numerous converts in Avanti, until the land sparkled with monk's robes, the texts say. He spend most of his time in Avanti, on a mountain called Kuraraghara. Nevertheless, he is said to have travelled to listen to the Buddha's sermons often, to the extent that his fellow disciples regularly left an empty seat for him to sit on. As Buddhism developed in Avanti, Kātyāyana made requests for amendments in monastic discipline to fit in better with the unique nature of the far land of Avanti.

In the Divāyadāna, Katyāyāna is also depicted as propagating Buddhism in the Northwestern city of Roruka. After having received a painting of the Buddha produced by King Bimbisāra's artists, a king called Rudrayana wished to meet Buddhist monks and learn about Buddhist doctrine. The Buddha sent Kātyāyana to teach the king. Katyāyāna was received well and managed to introduce Buddhism in the region, with two monks ordaining under him. When Rudrayana's harem was interested to listen to his teachings too, Kātyāyana refused, however, pointing to a prohibition that the Buddha had given in this regard. Katyāyāna had a nun send to them instead. As for Rudrayana, after the queen fell ill and died, he wanted to be with her in the afterlife, and decided that ordination as a monk could take him there.

After the First Buddhist Council, Kātyāyana lived in a woodland near Kosambī.

=== Discourses ===
Kātyāyana build up a reputation for expanding on brief statements and verses of the Buddha, that were sometimes not understood by the disciples. For this he was declared as foremost. Several early discourses are attributed to him. The Pāli texts state Kātyāyana taught the Madhupiṇḍika Sutta, the Kaccāyana Sutta, and the Parāyana Sutta. In the Madhura Sutta, King Avantiputta of Madhurā approached Kātyāyana some time after the Buddha's parinirvana with a question regarding the Brahmin's claims to superiority due to their caste. Kātyāyana pointed out that wealth confers power to people regardless of caste and that Brahmins experience the same results of good or evil conduct in the same way those of other castes do. Tradition also holds that Kātyāyana was the author of some verses of the Theragāthā, where he gives advice to meditators. Based on an analysis of his role in different discourses, Bhikkhu Anālayo considers him to play the role of a classical exegete.

== Later texts ==
Kātyāyana figures frequently in Mahāyāna texts. In the Vimalakīrti Nideśa, he is one of the disciples who refuses to visit the lay bodhisattva (Buddha-to-be) Vimalakīrti.

In Chapter 3 of the Lotus Sutra entitled "Simile and Parable", Kātyāyana is one of four disciples to understand the Buddha's intention to his sermon about the burning house, and who rejoice in the idea of the united vehicle (ekayāna). In Chapter 6 entitled "Bestowal of Prophecy", the Buddha bestows prophecies of enlightenment on numerous disciples, including Kātyāyana. It is predicted that Kātyāyana will become a Buddha named Jāmbūnadābhāsa.

== Heritage ==
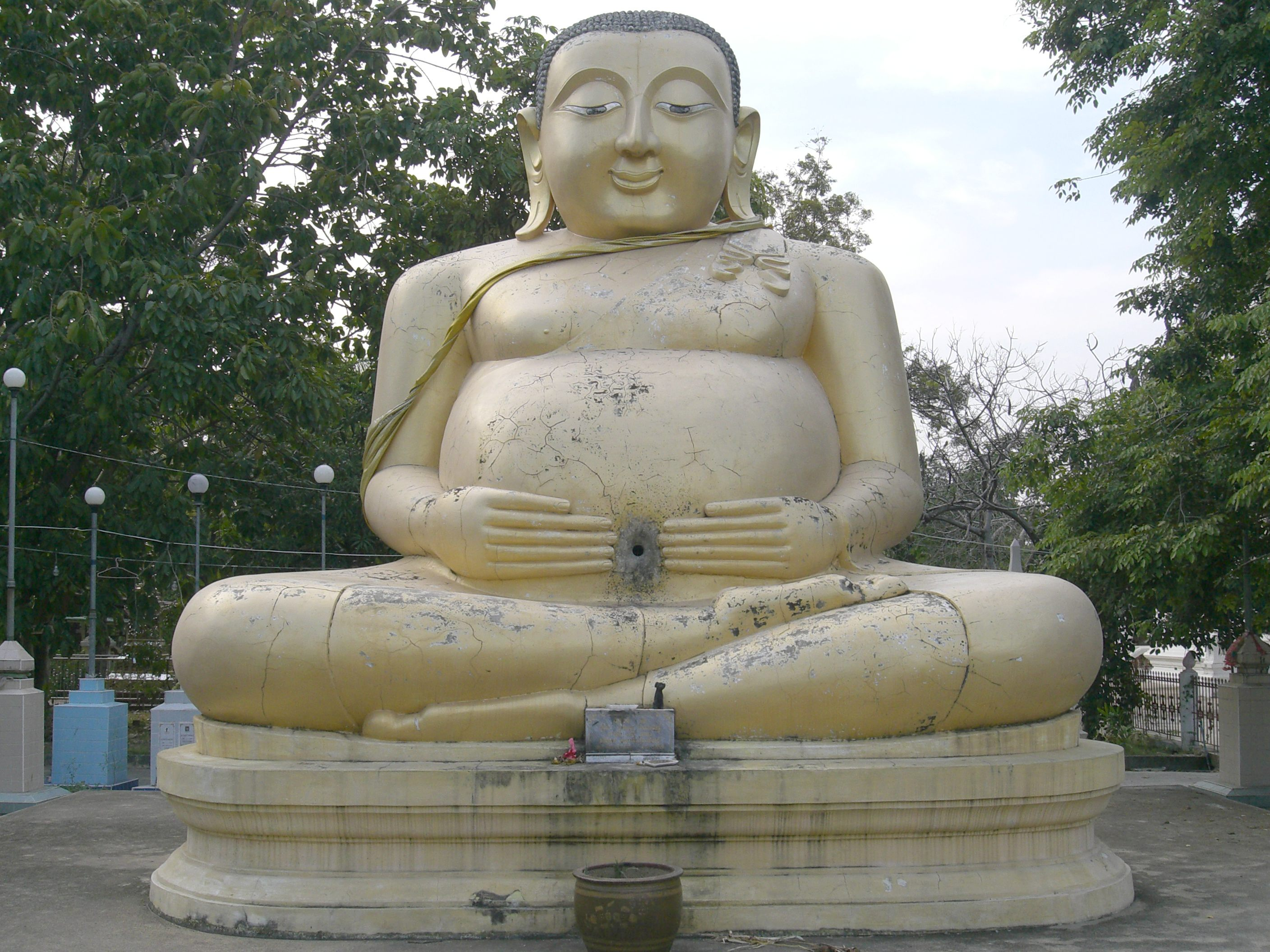
Statue of Kātyāyana in Thai tradition

Tradition attributes to Katyāyana the authorship of two late Pāli canonical texts, that is, the Nettipakarana, a commentary on Buddhist doctrine; and the Peṭakopadesa, a treatise on exegetical methodology. These are early commentaries, and they were the only commentaries considered by some traditions to be part of the early collection of discourses. Apart from these, the Kaccāyanavyākaraṇa, a work on Pāli grammar, is also traditionally attributed to him. In the Sārvāstivāda tradition, the Abhidharma text Jñānaprasthāna is attributed to him.

The Jñānaprasthāna is more likely to have been composed by an author Kātyāyana who lived several hundred years later. It is possible that the Pāli texts attributed to him were composed by a school that descended from him. Tradition associates his name with a Buddhist community in Avanti, which is also believed to have been the origin of the Pāli Canon.

Sanskrit sources state that Kātyāyana was the initiator of the early Sthavira school of Buddhism.

Kātyāyana is often depicted holding an alms bowl in front of his chest.

== See also ==
- Śrāvaka
- First Buddhist Council
