= Byākaraṇa =

Study of linguistics in Pali language

- OpenTipitaka
- Type: Grammar collection
- Parent: Pali literature
- Contains: Kaccāyanabyākaraṇaṃ; Moggallānabyākaraṇaṃ; Saddanītippakaraṇaṃ; Padarūpasiddhi; Moggallānapañcikā; Payogasiddhipāṭha; Vuttodayapāṭha; Abhidhānappadīpikāpāṭha; Abhidhānappadīpikāṭīkā; Subodhālaṅkārapāṭha; Subodhālaṅkāraṭīkā; Bālāvatāra gaṇṭhipadatthavinicchayasāra

Byākaraṇa or vyākaraṇa (Pali) is a term in the tradition of grammatical study that refers to the structure and rules of the Pali language. In the Theravada tradition, the study of byākaraṇa is essential for understanding and preserving the sacred texts of the Pali Canon (Tipiṭaka) by analyzing its linguistic elements, such as words, affixes, and rules of sentence formation.

== Origins ==
The Pali grammar tradition developed in India and Sri Lanka since the early centuries CE. Pali grammar books were compiled to help monks and students understand the Pali language used in Buddhist scriptures. The three main figures in the Pali grammar tradition are Kaccāyana, Moggallāna (12th century), and Aggavaṃsa, each of whom compiled a grammar book that serves as a reference to this day.

== List of texts ==
The following are the main texts in the Pali grammar tradition (byākaraṇa):

=== Kaccāyana-byākaraṇa ===
Kaccāyana-byākaraṇa (also known as Kaccāyana-vyākaraṇa) is the oldest extant Pali grammar book, compiled by Kaccāyana (estimated to have lived in the 7th–8th centuries CE). This book consists of eight chapters and contains grammatical rules in the form of short aphorisms. Kaccāyanabyākaraṇa became the foundation for most of the Pali grammar traditions in Myanmar, Sri Lanka, and Thailand.

=== Moggallāna-byākaraṇa ===
Moggallāna-byākaraṇa (or Moggallāna-vyākaraṇa) was compiled by Moggallāna (estimated to have lived in the 12th century CE). Unlike Kaccāyana, Moggallāna (12th century) also considered the grammatical interpretations found in the Aṭṭhakathā (commentaries on the Tipiṭaka) in his book. This book is one of the three most influential Pali grammar books, along with Kaccāyana-byākaraṇa and Saddanīti.

=== Saddanīti ===
Saddanīti-ppakaraṇa (Saddanīti) was compiled by Aggavaṃsa, a monk from the Pagan, Myanmar, in the mid-12th century CE (around 1154 CE). Aggavaṃsa served as a teacher to King Narapatisithu (1167–1202 CE). This book is one of the most comprehensive Pali grammar books, with a total of 1,795 pages in its printed edition. Saddanītippakaraṇa consists of three major chapters divided into 28 sections, and differs from other traditional grammar books because it incorporates a collection of verbal roots (dhātu) within it. It is often considered the best extant Pali grammar book.

=== Padarūpasiddhi ===
Padarūpasiddhi (also known as Rūpasiddhi) is a Pali grammar book written by Buddhappiya in the late 12th to early 13th century CE in Sri Lanka. This book is a rearrangement of the formulas from the Kaccāyana tradition with more detailed explanations. Padarūpasiddhi contains 28 rules regarding the formation of compound words (samāsa).

=== Moggallānapañcikā ===
Moggallānapañcikā is a commentary book (pañcikā) written by Moggallāna (12th century) himself as an explanation of his own Moggallānabyākaraṇa. This book was inspired by the Cāndrapañcikā model in the Sanskrit grammar tradition. In its colophon, Moggallāna (12th century) explicitly connects the compilation of his new grammatical system with the monastic reforms that occurred in the preceding years.

=== Payogasiddhi ===
Payogasiddhi-pāṭha (or Payogasiddhi) is a Pali grammar book belonging to the Moggallāna school, written by Vanaratana Medhaṅkara in the 13th century CE in Sri Lanka. This book is a development of Moggallāna's work and discusses the parts of grammar.

=== Vuttodaya ===
Vuttodaya-pāṭha (or Vuttodaya) is a book on Pali prosody (the study of poetic meter) written by Saṅgharakkhita (who is none other than Moggallāna), a Pali grammar expert from Sri Lanka in the 12th to 13th centuries. This book contains rules regarding meter and verse composition, and became one of the standard works in the field of Pali prosody during the medieval period. Vuttodayapāṭha is included among the standard works of Pali grammar along with Kaccāyana-byākaraṇa and Moggallāna-byākaraṇa.

=== Abhidhānappadīpikā ===
Abhidhānappadīpikā is a Pali thesaurus composed in the 12th century by the Sri Lankan grammarian Moggallāna Thera.

=== Subodhālaṅkāra ===
Subodhālaṅkāra (lit. 'Easily Understood Rhetoric') is a book on Pali language rhetoric (alaṅkāra) written by Saṅgharakkhita Mahāsāmi (the monastic name of Moggallāna Thera of Ceylon), a Sinhalese monk from Sri Lanka in the late 12th to mid-13th century CE. This book is the only extant treatise on Pali rhetoric, and along with Vuttodaya (Saṅgharakkhita's work on prosody) constitutes the two major works in the field of Pali poetics during the medieval period. Subodhālaṅkāra consists of 367 verses (kārikā) divided into five chapters, which discuss various aspects of the poetic art in the Pali language. The contents of the five chapters are as follows:

1. Dosāvabodha-paṭhamapariccheda (The First Chapter: On the Understanding of Faults): Incongruity of meaning and tautology
2. Dosaparihārāvabodha-dutiyapariccheda (The Second Chapter: Understanding the Remedying of Fault): The art of avoiding stylistic flaws
3. Guṇāvabodha-tatiyapariccheda (The Third Chapter: The Understanding of Virtues): The beauty of words and phrases
4. Atthālaṅkārāvabodha-catutthapariccheda (The Fourth Chapter: The Understanding of the Ornaments of Meaning): The beauty of meaning and how to achieve it
5. Bhāvāvabodha-pañcamapariccheda (The Fifth Chapter: The Understanding of Emotional States): The beauty of sound and the art of composing verses melodious to the listener's ear

There are two subcommentaries (ṭīkā) for this book, that is the Porāṇa-ṭīkā (or Mahāsāmi-ṭīkā), an ancient commentary written by Saṅgharakkhita himself as an autocommentary; and the Abhinava-ṭīkā, a new commentary written by Vācissara (Vācissara the Younger).

=== Bālāvatāra ===
Bālāvatāra is a basic Pali language grammar book consisting of seven chapters, written by Dhammakitti (or Vacissara) in the 14th century CE. This book is based on the Kaccāyana-byākaraṇa grammatical system and serves as an excellent summary of Pali grammar for beginners. There are several paraphrases in Sinhalese as well as two ṭīkā (subcommentaries) in Pali for this work.

== See also ==
- Pali language
- Pali Canon
- Kaccāyana
- Moggallāna (12th century)
- Vyakarana, Sanskrit grammar in Hinduism
