= Mahīśāsaka =

Buddhist school of thought

The Mahīśāsaka (Sanskrit: महीशासक; traditional Chinese: 化地部; ; pinyin: Huàdì Bù; Vietnamese: Hóa địa bộ) is one of the early Buddhist schools according to some records. Its origins may go back to the dispute in the Second Buddhist Council at Vaishali. The Dharmaguptaka sect is thought to have branched out from the Mahīśāsaka sect toward the end of the 2nd or the beginning of the 1st century BCE.

== History ==
There are two general accounts of the circumstances surrounding the origins of the Mahīśāsakas. The Theravādin Dīpavaṃsa asserts that the Mahīśāsaka sect gave rise to the Sarvāstivāda sect. However, both the Śāriputraparipṛcchā and the Samayabhedoparacanaćakra record that the Sarvāstivādins were the older sect out of which the Mahīśāsakas emerged. Buswell and Lopez also state that the Mahīśāsaka was an offshoot of the Sarvāstivādins, but group the school under the Vibhajyavāda, "a broad designation for non-Sarvastivāda strands of the Sthaviranikaya", which also included the Kāśyapīya.

The Mahīśāsaka originated in Mahishmati in the Avanti region of India, from which they derive their name. The Mahīśāsaka sect founder was a monk named Purāṇa, who is venerated at length in the Mahīśāsaka Vinaya, which is preserved in the Chinese Buddhist canon.

From the writings of Xuanzang, the Mahīśāsaka are known to have been active in Kashmir in the 4th century CE. Xuanzang records that Asaṅga, an important Yogācāra master and the elder brother of Vasubandhu, received ordination into the Mahīśāsaka sect. Asaṅga's frameworks for Abhidharma writings retained many underlying Mahīśāsaka traits. André Bareau writes:

[It is] sufficiently obvious that Asaṅga had been a Mahīśāsaka when he was a young monk, and that he incorporated a large part of the doctrinal opinions proper to this school within his own work after he became a great master of the Mahāyāna, when he made up what can be considered as a new and Mahāyānist Abhidharma-piṭaka.

The Mahīśāsaka are believed to have spread to southern India including Nāgārjunakoṇḍā, and even as far as the island of Sri Lanka. According to A. K. Warder, the Indian Mahīśāsaka sect also established itself in Sri Lanka alongside the Theravāda, into which they were later absorbed.

In the 7th century CE, Yijing grouped the Mahīśāsaka, Dharmaguptaka, and Kāśyapīya together as sub-sects of the Sarvāstivāda, and stated that these three were not prevalent in the "five parts of India", but were located in the some parts of Oḍḍiyāna, the Kingdom of Khotan, and Kucha.

== Appearance ==
Between 148 and 170 CE, the Parthian monk An Shigao came to China and translated a work which describes the color of monastic robes (Skt. kāṣāya) utilised in five major Indian Buddhist sects, called Da Biqiu Sanqian Weiyi (Chinese: 大比丘三千威儀). Another text translated at a later date, the Śāriputraparipṛcchā, contains a very similar passage corroborating this information. In both sources, members of the Mahīśāsaka sect are described as wearing blue robes. The relevant portion of the Mahāsāṃghika Śāriputraparipṛcchā reads, "The Mahīśāsaka school practice dhyāna, and penetrate deeply. They wear blue robes."

== Doctrines ==
According to the Mahīśāsakas, the Four Noble Truths were to be meditated upon simultaneously.

The Mahīśāsaka sect held that everything exists, but only in the present. They also regarded a gift to the Saṃgha as being more meritorious than one given to the Buddha. They disagreed with the Dharmaguptakas on this point, as the Dharmaguptakas believed that a giving a gift to the Buddha is more meritorious than giving one to the Saṃgha.

The earlier Mahīśāsakas appear to have not held the doctrine of an intermediate state between death and rebirth, but later Mahīśāsakas accepted this doctrine.

== Works ==
=== Mahīśāsaka Vinaya ===
The Indian Mahīśāsaka sect also established itself in Sri Lanka alongside the Theravāda, into which these members were later absorbed. It is known that Faxian obtained a Sanskrit copy of the Mahīśāsaka Vinaya at Abhayagiri Vihāra in Sri Lanka, c. 406 CE. The Mahīśāsaka Vinaya was then translated into Chinese in 434 CE by Buddhajiva and Zhu Daosheng. This translation of the Mahīśāsaka Vinaya remains extant in the Chinese Buddhist canon as Taishō Tripiṭaka 1421.

=== Mahāyāna works ===
It is believed that the Mahāyāna Infinite Life Sūtra was compiled in the age of the Kushan Empire, in the 1st and 2nd centuries CE, by an order of Mahīśāsaka bhikṣus that flourished in the Gandhara region. It is likely that the Longer Sukhāvatīvyūha Sūtra owed greatly to the Lokottaravāda sect as well for its compilation, and in this Sūtra there are many elements in common with the Mahāvastu. The earliest of these translations show traces of having been translated from the Gāndhārī language, a Prakrit used in the Northwest Indian subcontinent. It is also known that manuscripts in the Kharoṣṭhī script existed in China during this period.

== Views on women ==
The Mahīśāsaka sect believed that it was not possible for women to become buddhas. In the Nāgadatta Sūtra, the Mahīśāsaka view is criticised in a narrative about a bhikṣuṇī named Nāgadatta. Here, the demon Māra takes the form of her father, and tries to convince her to work toward the lower stage of an arhat, rather than that of a fully enlightened buddha (samyaksaṃbuddha):

Māra therefore took the disguise of Nāgadatta's father and said thus to Nāgadatta: "Your thought is too serious. Buddhahood is too difficult to attain. It takes a hundred thousand nayutas of kotis of kalpas to become a Buddha. Since few people attain Buddhahood in this world, why don't you attain Arhatship? For the experience of Arhatship is the same as that of nirvāṇa; moreover, it is easy to attain Arhatship."

In her reply, Nāgadatta rejects arhatship as a lower path, saying:

A Buddha's wisdom is like empty space of the ten quarters, which can enlighten innumerable people. But an Arhat's wisdom is inferior.

The Mahīśāsaka sect held that there were five obstacles that were laid before women. These are that they may not become a Ćakravartin, Māra king, Śakra king, Brahma king or a Buddha. This Mahīśāsaka view is ascribed to Māra in the Nāgadatta Sūtra of the Sarvāstivādins:

Māra said, "I have not even heard that a woman can be reborn as a cakravartin; how can you be reborn as a Buddha? It takes too long to attain Buddhahood, why not seek for Arhatship and attain nirvāṇa soon?" Nāgadatta replied, "I also have heard that a woman cannot be reborn as a cakravartin, a Sakra, a Brahma, and a Buddha, and yet I shall make the right effort to transform a woman's body into a man's. For I have heard that those Noble Ones, by the practice of bodhisattvacarya for a hundred thousand nayutas of kotis of kalpas diligently attain Buddhahood."

The Mahīśāsakas believed that women essentially could not change the nature of their minds or physical bodies, and would cause the teachings of Buddhism to decline. Of this, David Kalupahana writes:

The Mahīśāsaka prejudice against women is based upon the traditional view of women. Like some of the other early Buddhist practitioners, they did not trust women, even nuns. This explains why they restricted nuns' social and religious activities in the sangha. Sometimes they liken the nuns' existence to hail which damages a good harvest.

== See also ==
- Schools of Buddhism
- Early Buddhist schools
- Nikaya Buddhism

== Sources ==
- Buswell, Robert E.; Lopez, Donald S. (2013), The Princeton Dictionary of Buddhism, Princeton University Press.
- Hino, Shoun; Wada, Toshihiro, eds. (2004), Three Mountains and Seven Rivers: Prof. Musashi Tachikawa's felicitation volume, Delhi: Motilal Banarsidass, ISBN 978-8120824683.
- Kalupahana, David (2001), Buddhist Thought and Ritual, New York: Paragon House, ISBN 978-0892260898.
