= Kasaya (clothing) =

Buddhist Cassock worn by fully-ordained Buddhist monks and nuns

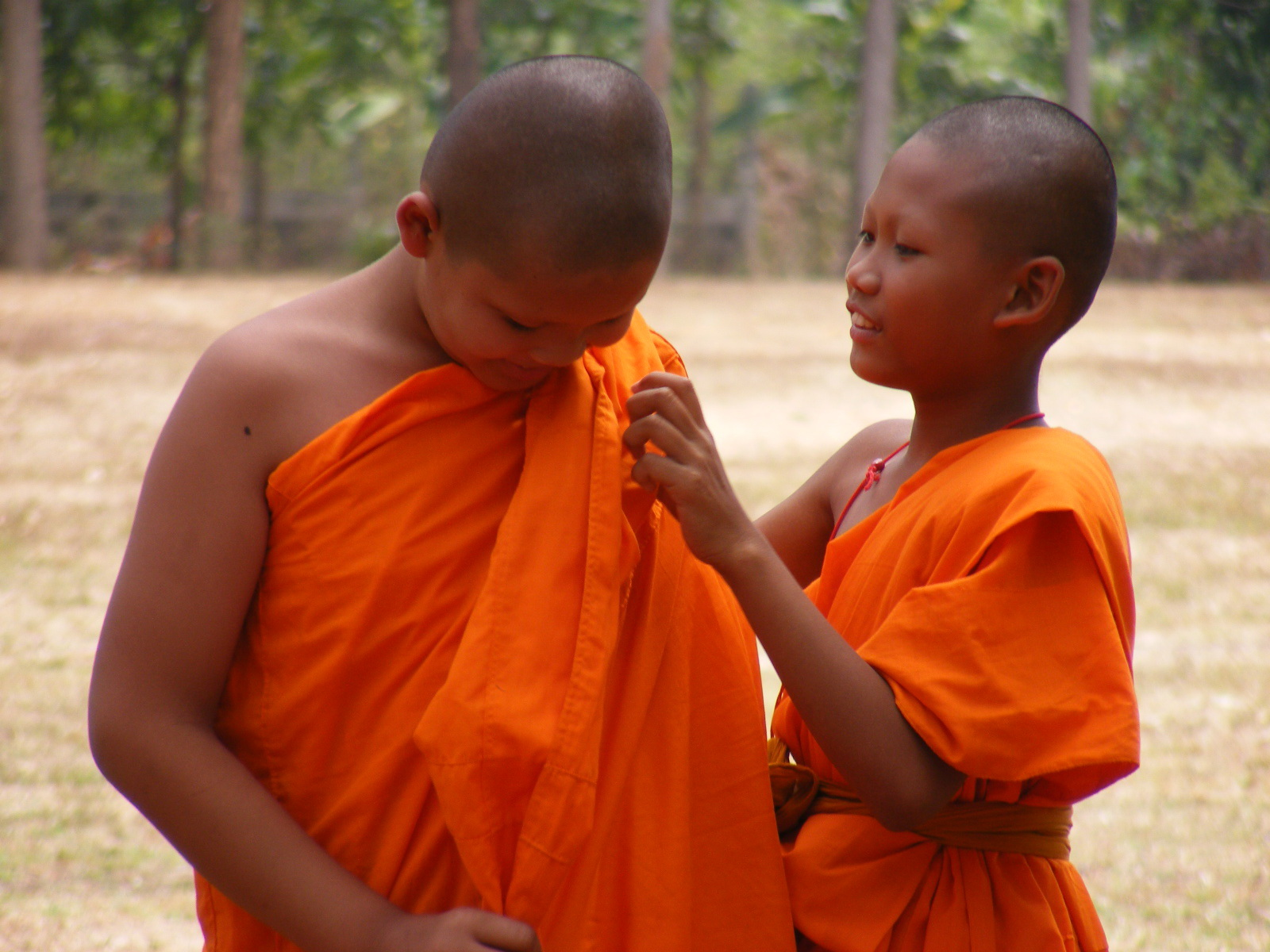
Orange kasaya

Kāṣāya (Note: Sanskrit: काषाय, kāṣāya; Pali: kāsāva/kāsāya; Sinhala: කසාවත; Chinese: 袈裟; pinyin: jiāshā; Japanese: けさ kesa; Korean: 가사 gasa; Vietnamese: cà-sa, Tibetan: ཆོས་གོས, THL: chögö) are the robes of fully ordained Buddhist monks and nuns, named after a brown or saffron dye. In Sanskrit and Pali, these robes are also given the more general term cīvara, which references the robes without regard to color.

== Origin and construction ==
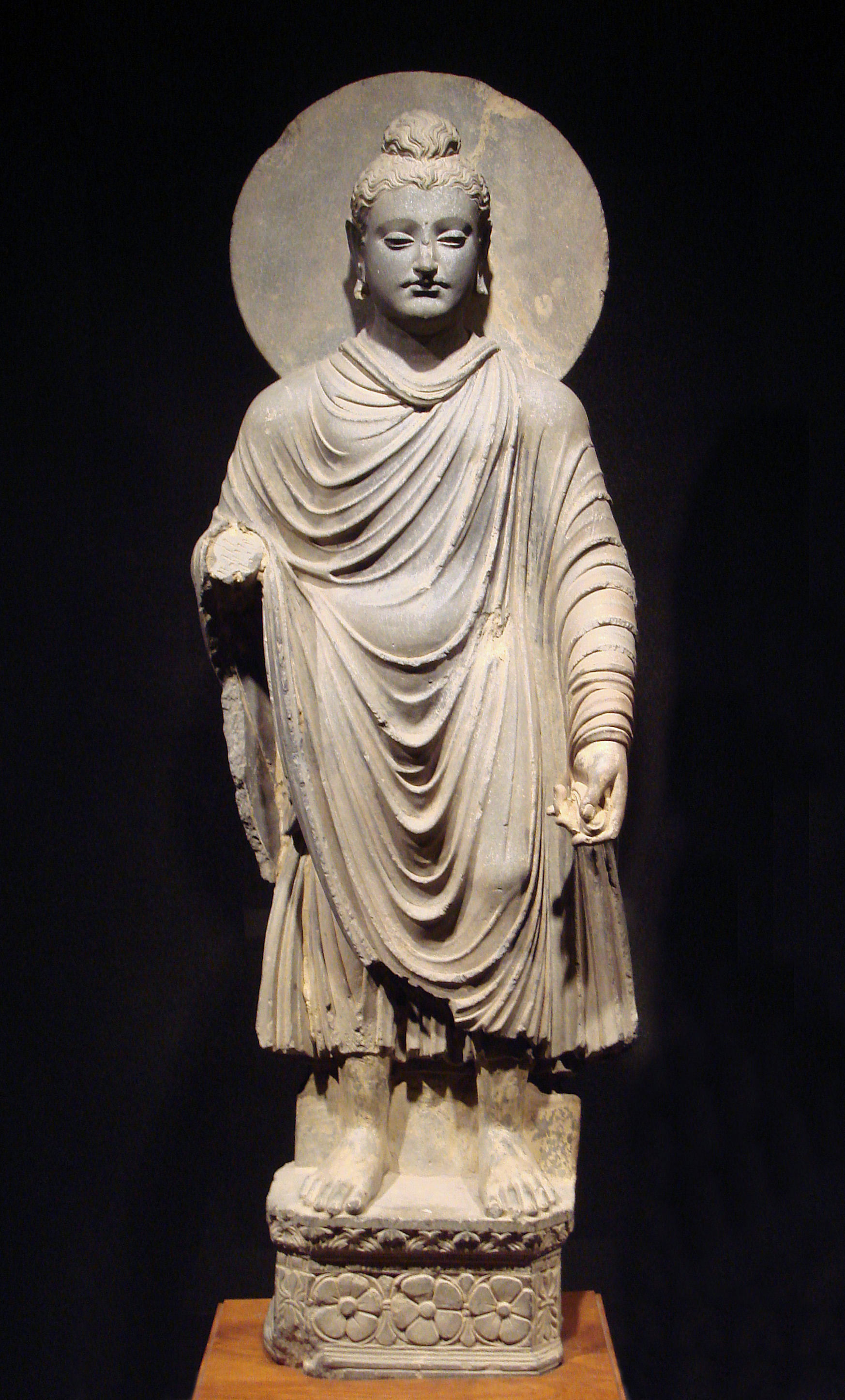
An early representation of the Buddha wearing kāṣāya robes.

Buddhist kāṣāya are said to have originated in ancient India as a set of robes for monks who followed the teachings of Gautama Buddha. A notable variant has a pattern reminiscent of an Asian rice field. Original kāṣāya were constructed of discarded fabric. These were stitched together to form three rectangular pieces of cloth, which were then fitted over the body in a specific manner. The three main pieces of cloth are the antarvāsa, the uttarāsaṅga, and the saṃghāti. Together they form the "triple robe," or ticīvara. The ticīvara is described more fully in the Theravāda Vinaya.

=== Antarvāsa (Antaravāsaka) ===
The antarvāsa is the inner robe covering the lower body. It is the undergarment that flows underneath the other layers of clothing. It has a large top, and almost entirely covers the torso. In representations of the Buddha, the bottom of the antarvāsa usually protrudes, and appears in the rough shape of a triangle. This garment is essentially a skirt, which was common enough as ancient menswear. When needed, its height could be adjusted so it did not hang as low as the ankles.

=== Uttarāsaṅga ===
A robe covering the upper body. It comes over the undergarment, or antarvāsa. In representations of the Buddha, the uttarāsaṅga rarely appears as the uppermost garment, since it is often covered by the outer robe, or saṃghāti. Or can be worn with a jacket or cardigan.

=== Saṃghāti ===
The saṃghāti is a double layers robe of Bhikkhus or Bhikkhunis used as an outer cloak for various occasions. It comes over the upper robe (uttarāsaṅga), and the undergarment (antarvāsa). In representations of the Buddha, the saṃghāti is usually the most visible garment, with the undergarment or uttarāsaṅga protruding at the bottom. It is quite similar in shape to the Greek himation, and its shape and folds have been treated in Greek style in the Greco-Buddhist art of Gandhāra.

=== Additions ===
Other items that may have been worn with the triple robe were:

- a waist cloth, the kushalaka
- a buckled belt, the samakaksika

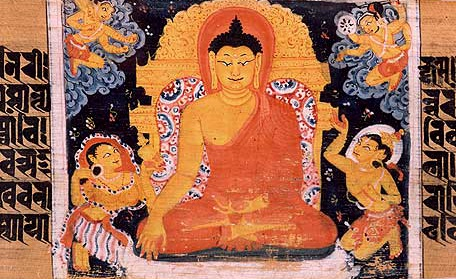
Indian depiction of the Buddha wearing red robes. Sanskrit manuscript. Nālandā, Bihar, India. Pāla period.

== Indian Buddhism ==
In India, variations of the kāṣāya robe distinguished different types of monastics. These represented the different schools that they belonged to, and their robes ranged widely from red and ochre, to blue and black.

Between 148 and 170 CE, the Parthian monk An Shigao came to China and translated a work which describes the color of monastic robes used in five major Indian Buddhist sects, called Da Biqiu Sanqian Weiyi (大比丘三千威仪; 大比丘三千威儀; Dà Bǐqiū Sānqiān Wēiyí). Another text translated at a later date, the Śāriputraparipṛcchā, contains a very similar passage corroborating this information, but the colors for the Sarvāstivāda and Dharmaguptaka sects are reversed.

Nikāya	Da Biqiu Sanqian Weiyi	Śāriputraparipṛcchā
Sarvāstivāda	Deep Red	Black
Dharmaguptaka	Black	Deep Red
Mahāsāṃghika	Yellow	Yellow
Mahīśāsaka	Blue	Blue
Kaśyapīya	Magnolia	Magnolia

In traditions of Tibetan Buddhism, which follow the Mūlasarvāstivāda Vinaya, red robes are regarded as characteristic of the Mūlasarvāstivādins.

According to Dudjom Jigdral Yeshe Dorje, the robes of fully ordained Mahāsāṃghika monastics were to be sewn out of more than seven but no more than twenty-three sections. The symbols sewn on the robes were the endless knot (Skt. śrīvatsa) and the conch (Skt. śaṅkha), two of the aṣṭamaṅgala, auspicious symbols in Buddhism.

== Jiasha in Chinese Buddhism ==
In Chinese Buddhism, the term jiasha (Chinese: 袈裟; pinyin: jiāshā) was borrowed from the term kāṣāya. In China, the jiasha refers to a one-piece, patchworked rectangular fabric which is worn over a long one-piece, cross-collar robe known as zhiduo.

During the early period of Chinese Buddhism, the most common color was red. Later, the color of the robes came to serve as a way to distinguish monastics, just as they did in India. However, the colors of a Chinese Buddhist monastic's robes often corresponded to their geographical region rather than to any specific schools. By the maturation of Chinese Buddhism, only the Dharmaguptaka ordination lineage was still in use, and therefore the color of robes served no useful purpose as a designation for sects, the way that it had in India.

During the Tang dynasty, Chinese Buddhist monastics typically wore grayish-black robes, and were even colloquially referred to as Ziyi (緇衣), "those of the black robes." However, the Song dynasty monk Zanning (919–1001 CE) writes that during the earlier Han-Wei period, the Chinese monks typically wore red.

Chinese jiasha

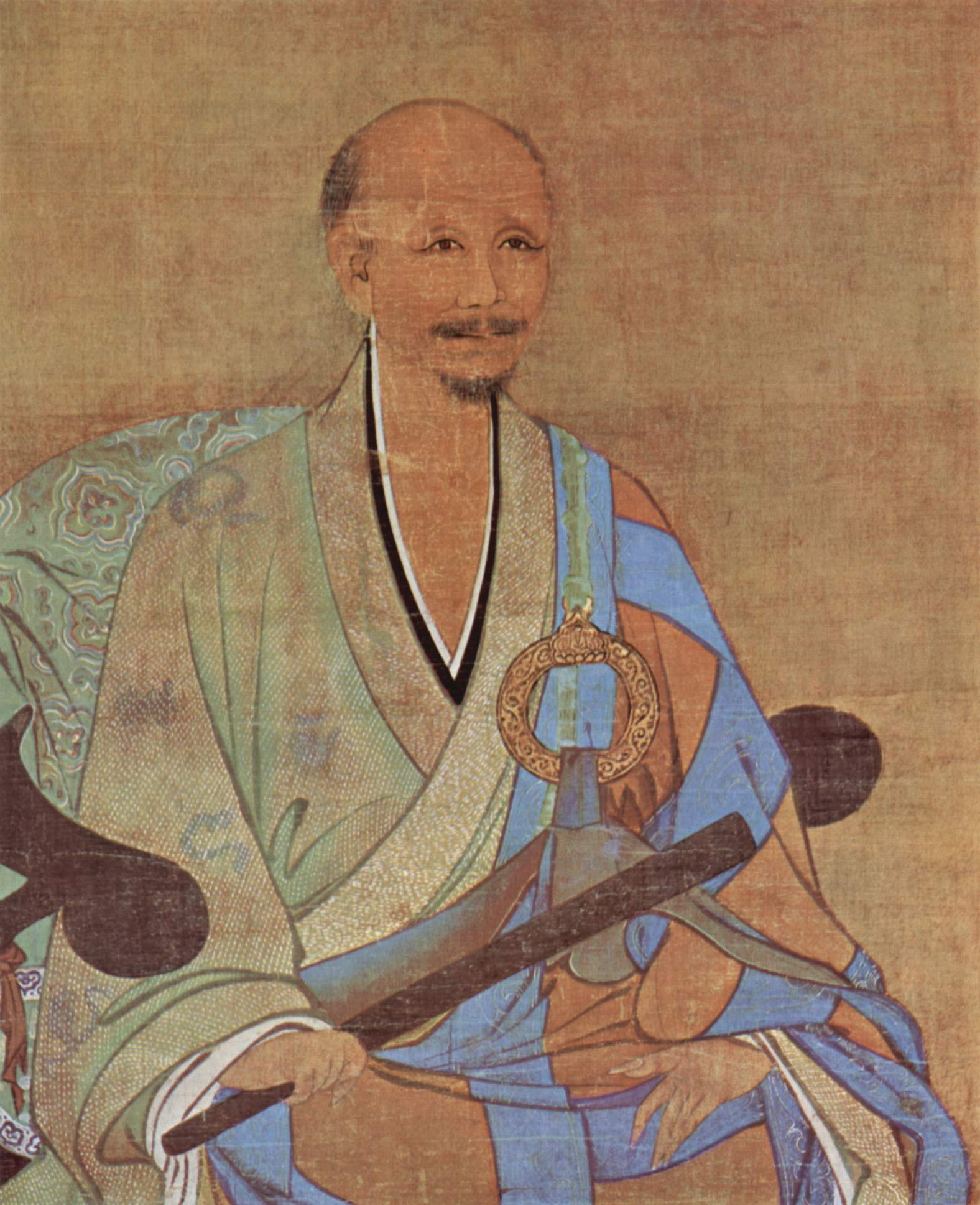
Portrait of Chan Buddhist master Wuzhun Shifan wearing jiasha over zhiduo, painted in 1238, Song dynasty.

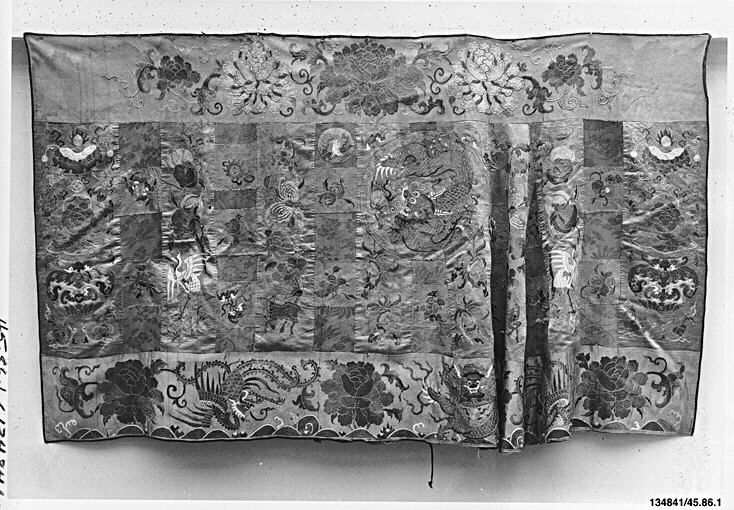
Robe for Buddhist Priest, Qing dynasty, 19th century.

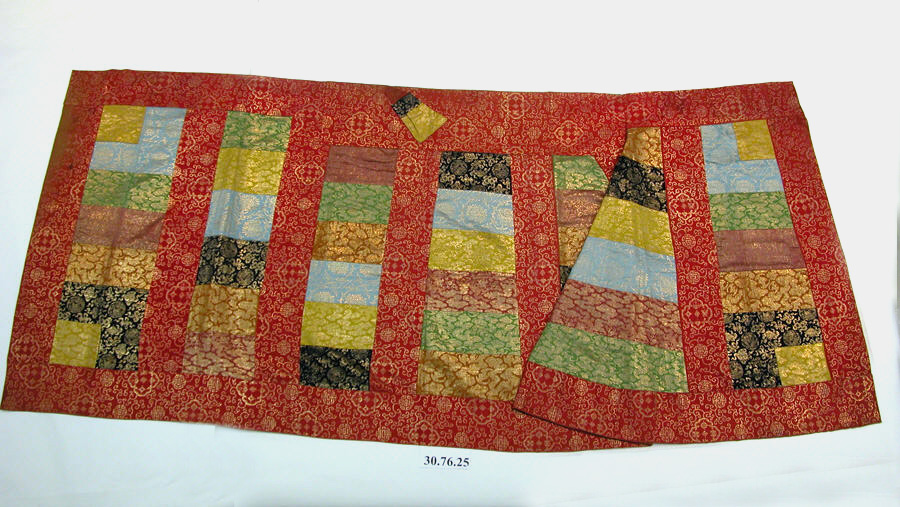
A jiasha used as a theatrical costume for a Buddhist priest; Silk brocade patchwork, 18th century.

== Kesa in Japanese Buddhism ==
The Japanese term kesa came from the Chinese transliteration of the term kāṣāya. Like in China, the kesa is a rectangular garment which is worn over the left shoulder. The Japanese kesa are also made of patchwork (割截衣; kassetsue) which can be composed of five, seven, nine, or more panels of fabric sewed together. The kesa is worn over a Chinese-style long robe, called jikitotsu (直裰) which was also developed in China, and had a belt or sash tied at the waist. Zen Buddhist monks wear a form of formal dress which is composed of two kimono, covered by the jikitotsu; and the kesa is finally worn on top of the jikitotsu.

Japanese buddhism kesa (袈裟) used to be worn covering the entire body beneath the head, including both shoulders, but now they are worn with the right shoulder exposed, except in special cases (偏袒右肩; Hendan-uken). This is to show the worship and reverence for Buddha, as opposed to the ones worn by Tathāgata covering both shoulders (通肩; Tsuken).

Japanese kesa

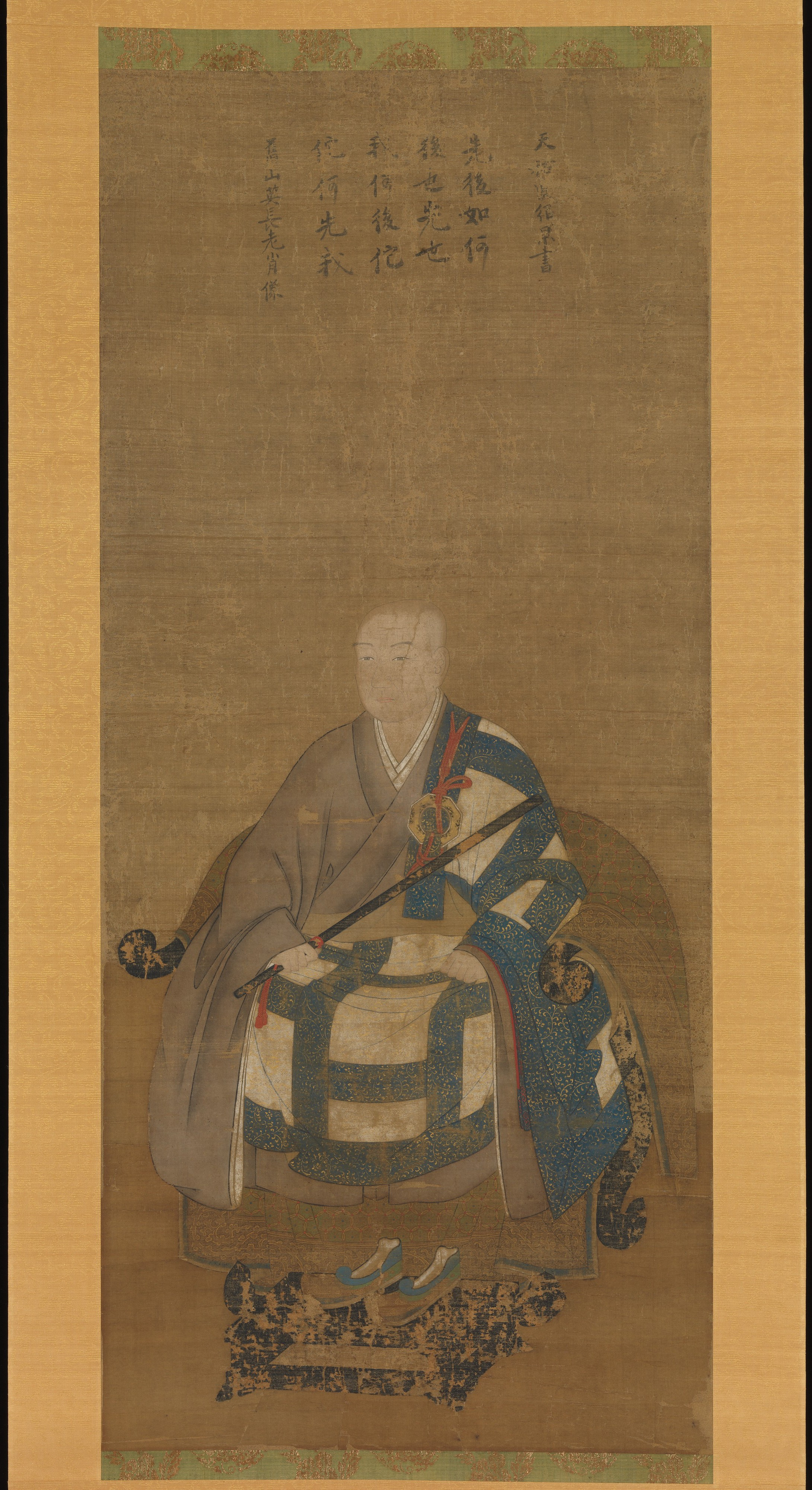
Portrait of Buddhist Kyūzan Sōei, Japan, 17th century.

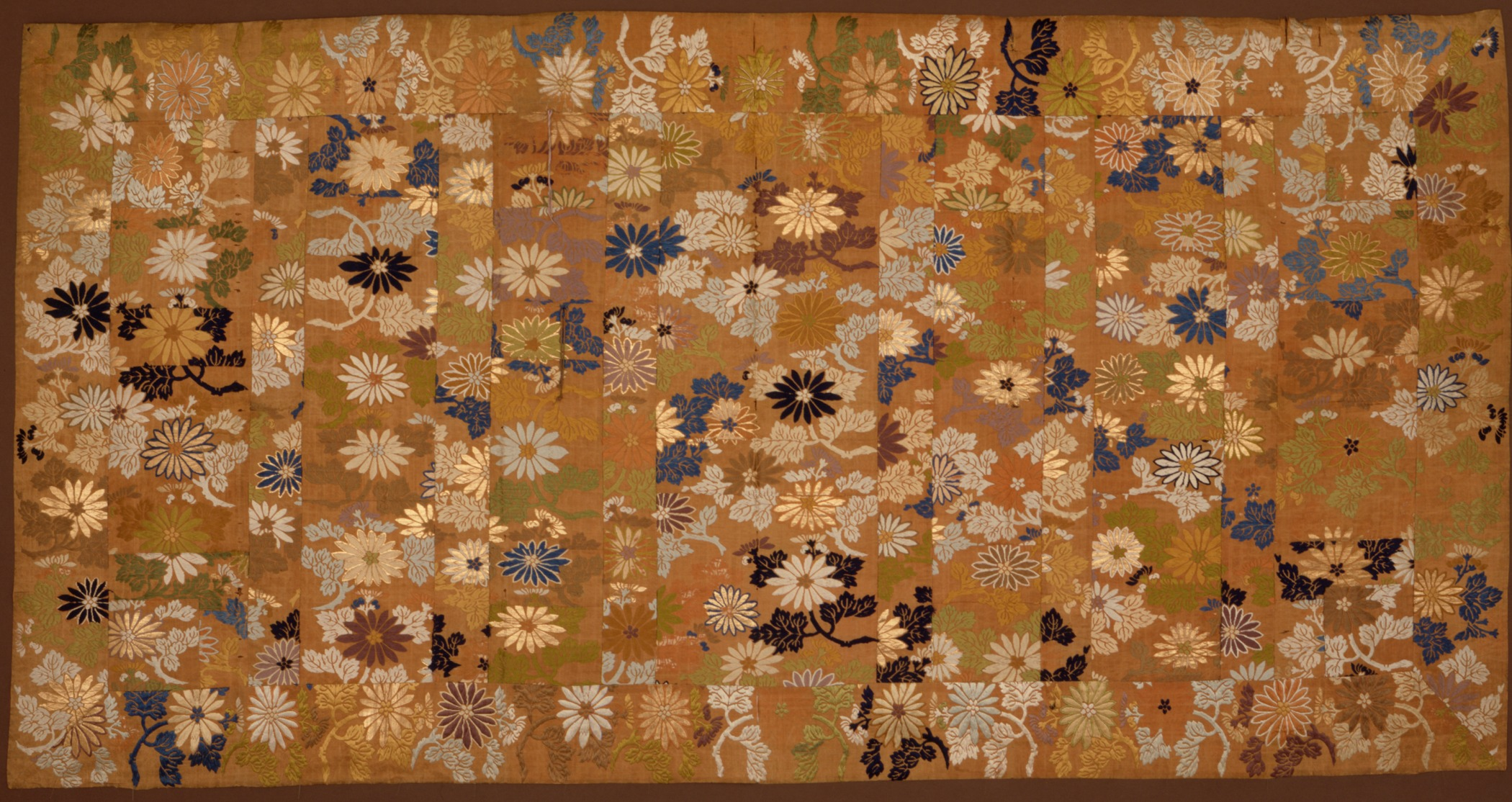

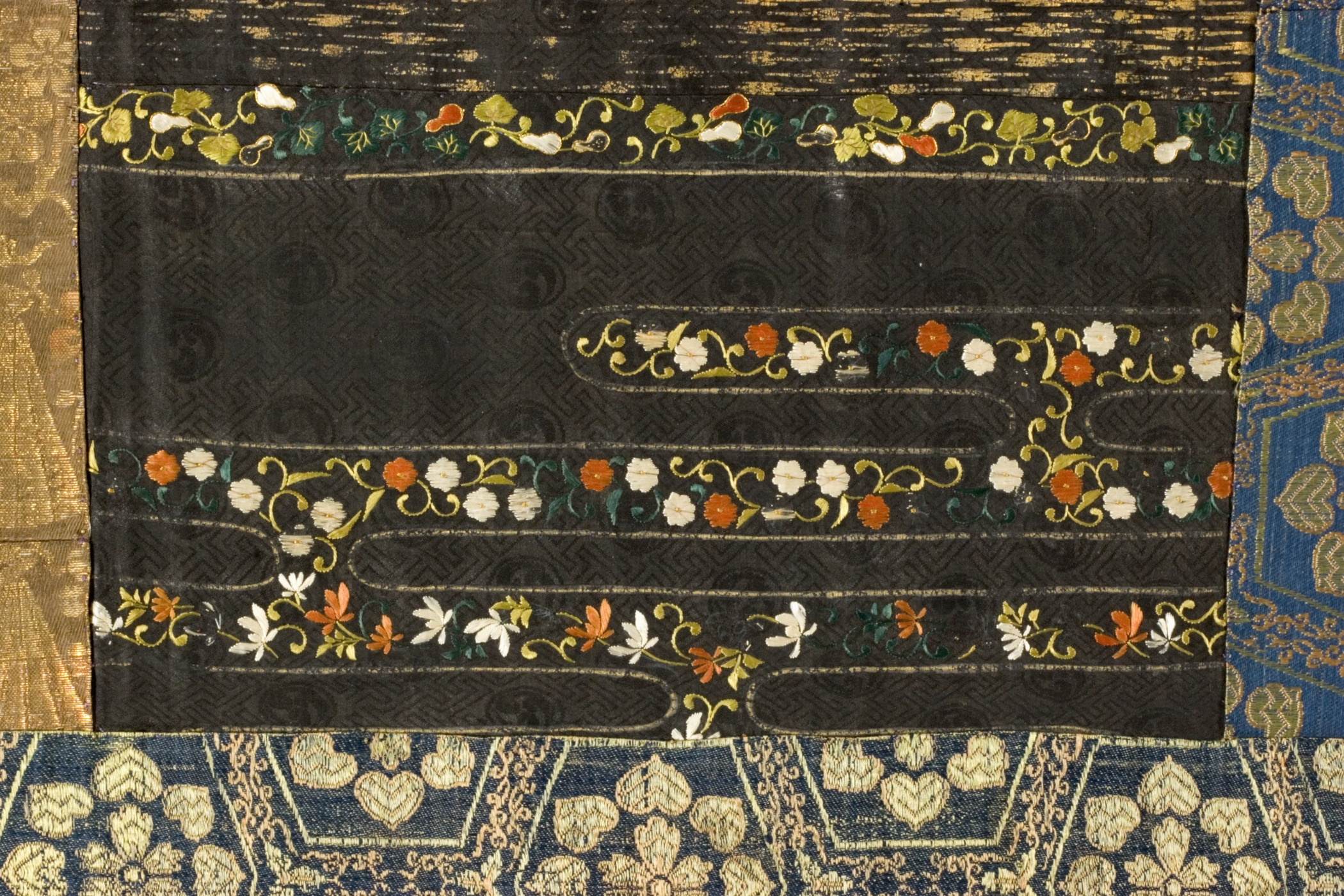

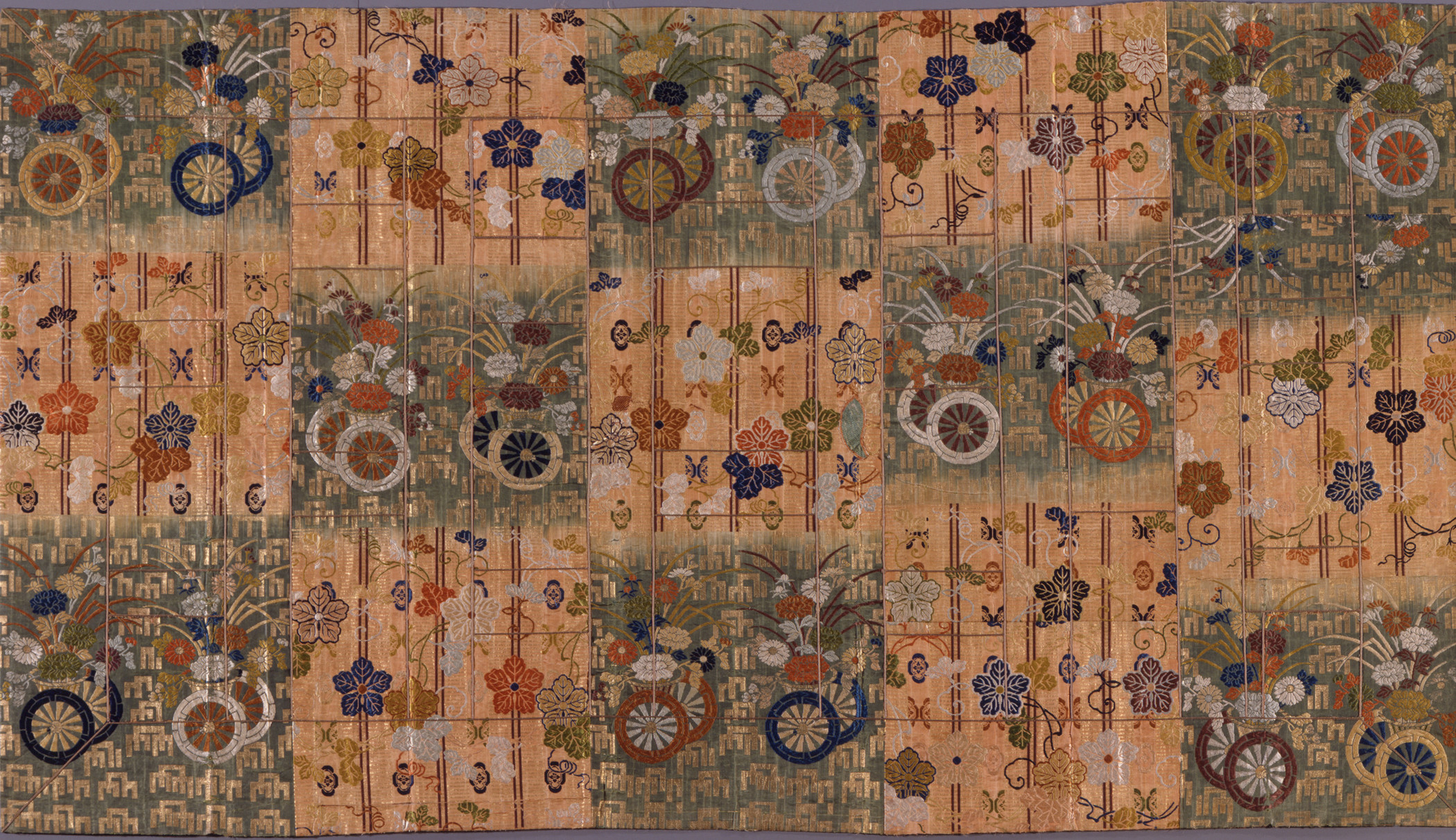
Japanese Buddhist priest's Mantle (kesa), 1775–1825. LACMA textile collections.

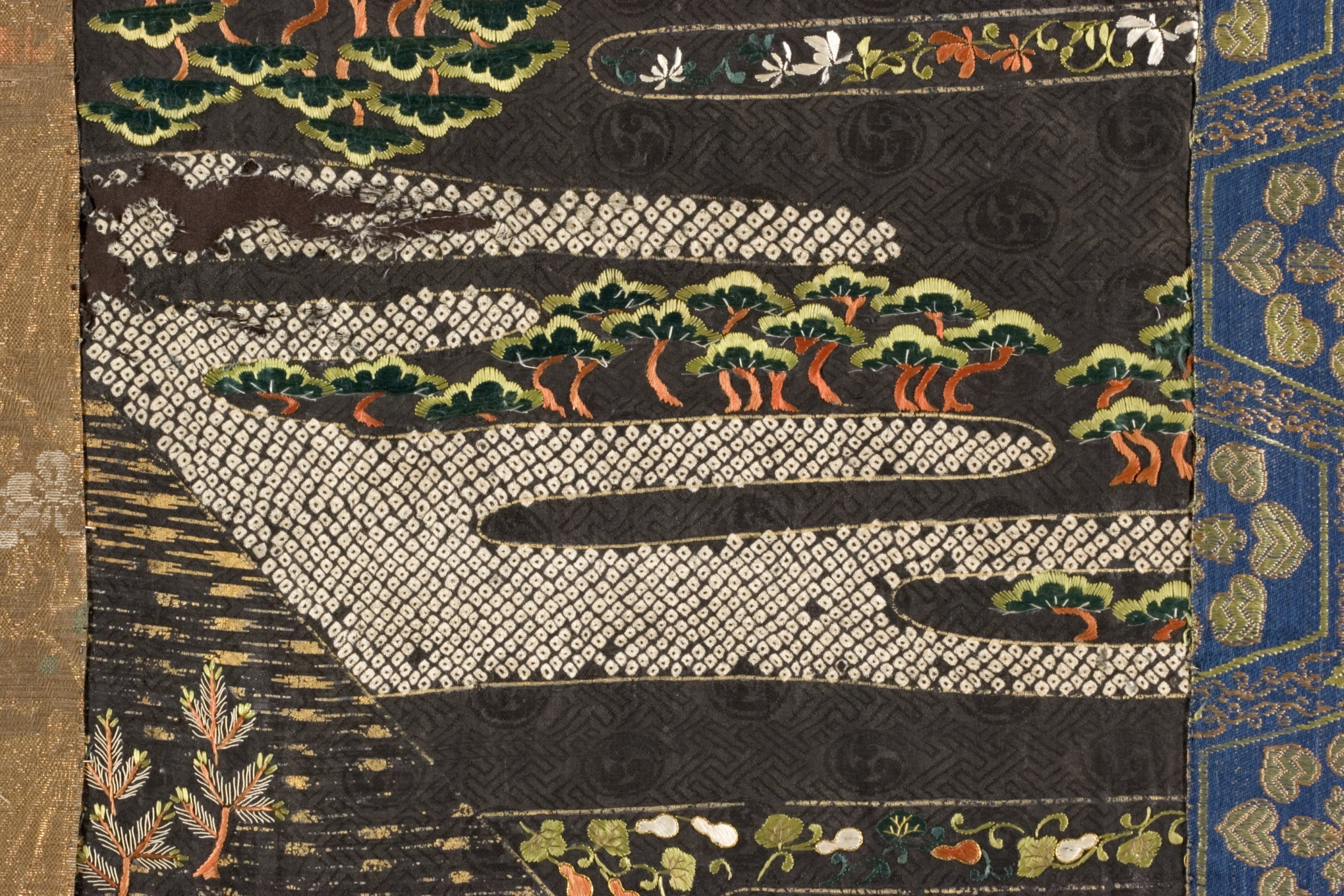

== See also ==
- Zhiduo - Chinese Buddhist crossed-collar robe.
- Sang-kio-ki
