= Lokottaravāda =

Early Buddhist school

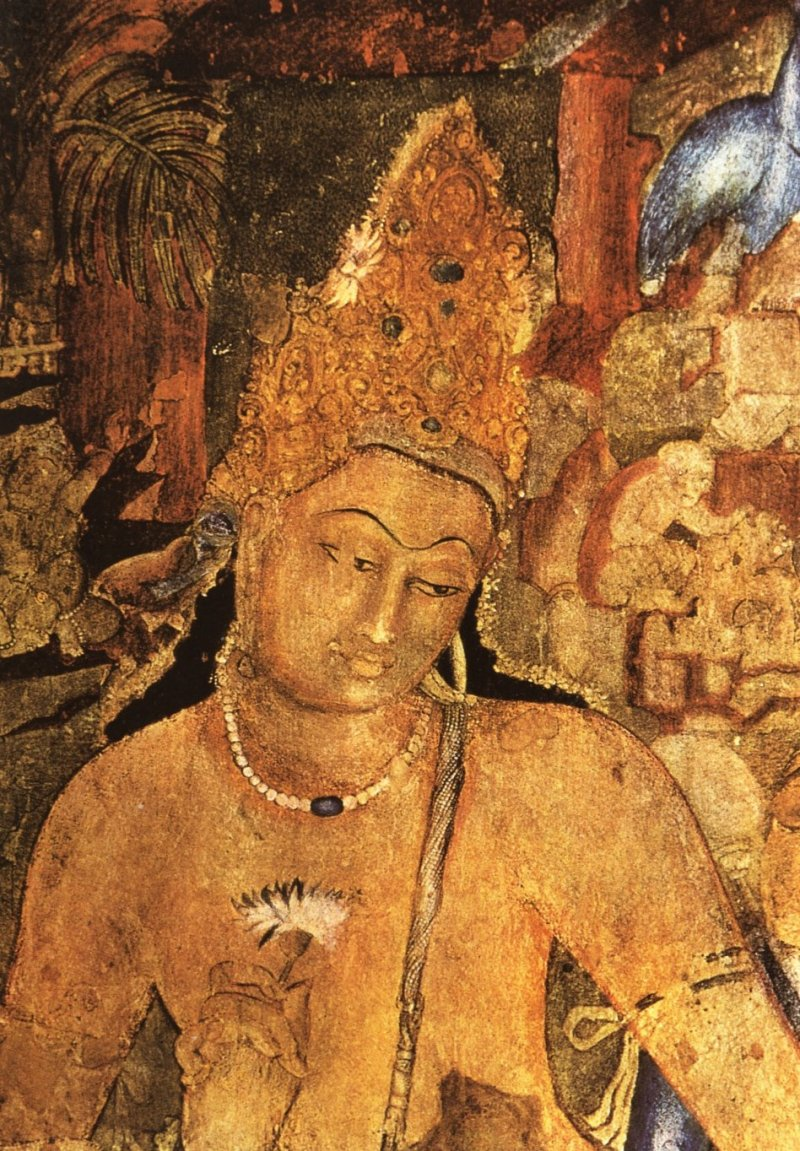
The Lokottaravāda held there were innumerable Pure Lands of buddhas and bodhisattvas.

The Lokottaravāda (Sanskrit: लोकोत्तरवाद; traditional Chinese: 說出世部; ; pinyin: Shuō Chūshì Bù; Vietnamese: Xuất thế thuyết bộ) was one of the early Buddhist schools according to Mahāyāna doxological sources compiled by Bhāviveka, Vinitadeva and others, and was a subgroup which emerged from the Mahāsāṃghika.

== Etymology ==
The name Lokottaravāda means those who follow the supramundane (Skt. lokottara), or transcendent, teachings. Despite bearing this name, all sub-sects of the Mahāsāṃghikas seem to have accepted forms of supramundane or transcendent teachings.

== Early history ==
The Śāriputraparipṛcchā and the Samayabhedoparacanaćakra both suggest that the Lokottaravāda had their origins with the Ekavyāvahārikas and the Kukkuṭikas. While the Mahāsāṃghikas initially flourished in the region around Magadha, the Lokottaravādins are known to have flourished in the Northwest India.

The 6th century CE Indian monk Paramārtha wrote that 200 years after the parinirvāṇa of the Buddha, much of the Mahāsāṃghika school moved north of Rājagṛha, and were divided over whether the Mahāyāna teachings should be incorporated formally into their Tripiṭaka. According to this account, they split into three groups based upon the relative manner and degree to which they accepted the authority of these Mahāyāna texts. According to Paramārtha, the Lokottaravādins accepted the Mahāyāna sūtras as the words of the Buddha (buddhavacana).

== Texts ==
=== Mahāvastu ===
Lokottaravādin views are known from the Mahāvastu, which is a rare surviving Mahāsāṃghika text in Sanskrit. The Mahāvastu is a biography of the Buddha which attributes itself to the Lokottaravādins, and appears to have been an extended section of their Vinaya recension. The Sanskrit text of the Mahāvastu was preserved in the libraries of the Mahāyāna Buddhists of Nepal.

=== Sukhāvatīvyūha influences ===
Some scholars believe that the Mahāyāna Infinite Life Sūtra was compiled in the era of the Kushan Empire, the first and second centuries CE, by an order of Mahīśāsaka monastics that flourished in Gandhāra. However, it is likely that the longer Infinite Life Sūtra owes greatly to the Lokottaravādins as well for its compilation: in this sūtra, there are many elements in common with the Mahāvastu. The earliest of these translations show traces of having been translated from the Gāndhārī.

=== Bamiyan monastery collection ===
The Chinese Buddhist monk Xuanzang visited a Lokottaravāda vihara in the 7th century at Bamyan (modern Afghanistan); this monastery site has since been rediscovered by archaeologists. Birch bark and palm-leaf manuscripts of texts in this monastery's collection, including Mahāyāna sūtras, have been discovered at the site, and these are now located in the Schøyen Collection. Some manuscripts are in Gāndhārī and written in Kharosthi, while others are in Sanskrit written in Gupta scripts. Manuscripts and fragments that have survived from this monastery's collection include the following source texts:

- Prātimokṣa Vibhaṅga of the Mahāsāṃghika-Lokottaravāda (MS 2382/269)
- Mahāparinirvāṇa Sūtra, a sūtra from the Āgamas (MS 2179/44)
- Caṃkī Sūtra, a sūtra from the Āgamas (MS 2376) (The Caṅkī Sutta is the version in the Pali Canon.)
- Diamond Sūtra, a Mahāyāna sūtra (MS 2385)
- Bhaiṣajyaguru Sūtra, a Mahāyāna sūtra (MS 2385)
- Śrīmālādevī Siṃhanāda Sūtra, a Mahāyāna sūtra (MS 2378)
- Pravāraṇa Sūtra, a Mahāyāna sūtra (MS 2378)
- Sarvadharmapravṛttinirdeśa Sūtra, a Mahāyāna sūtra (MS 2378)
- Ajātaśatrukaukṛtyavinodana Sūtra, a Mahāyāna sūtra (MS 2378)
- Śāriputrābhidharma Śāstra (MS 2375/08)

== Doctrines ==
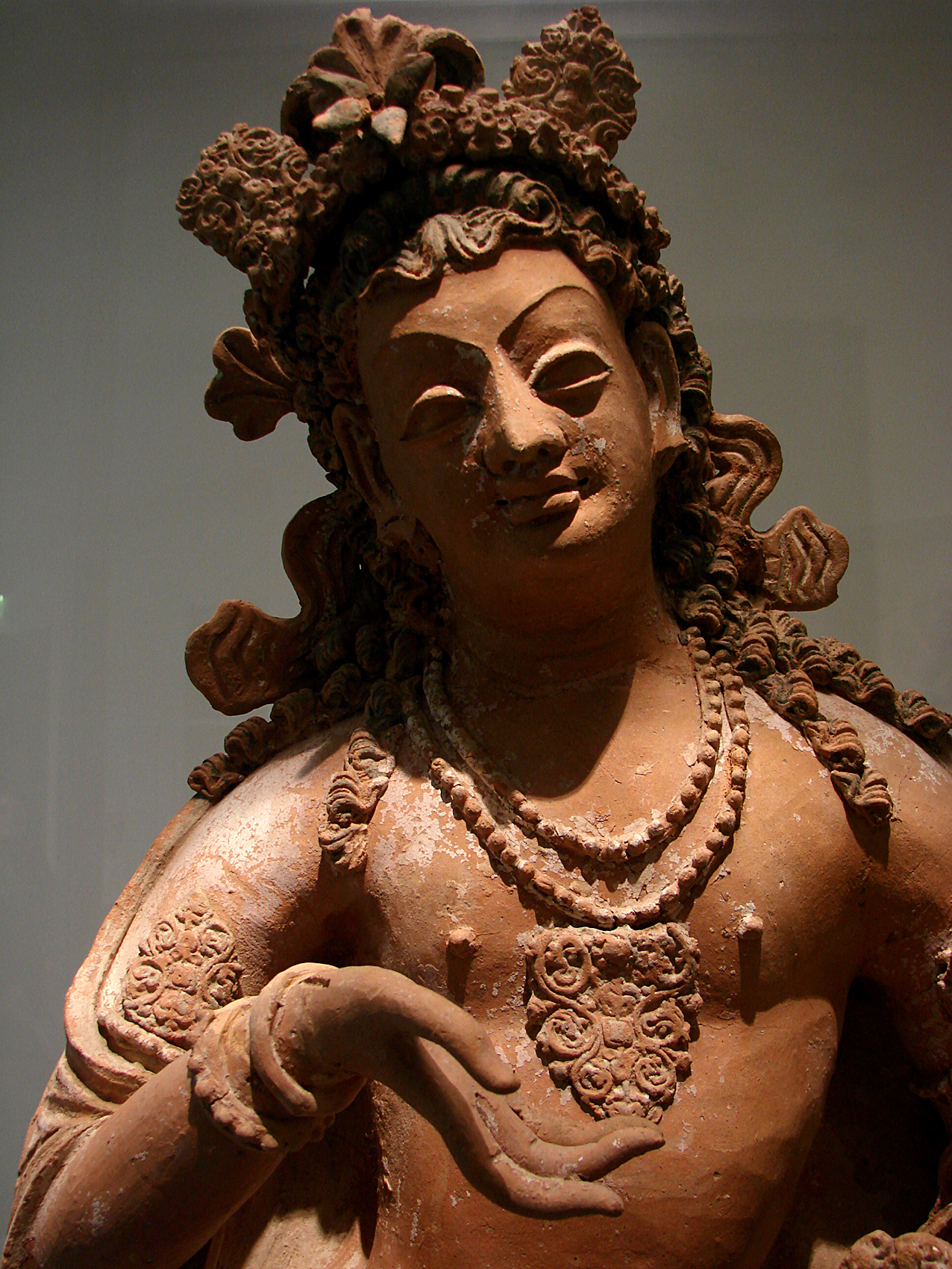
Bodhisattva statue from a Buddhist monastery in Afghanistan, a region where the Lokottaravāda were known to be prominent.

=== Overview ===
It is likely that the Lokottaravādins had no major doctrinal distinctions to distinguish them as different from Mahāsāṃghika, but that the difference was instead a geographic one. Tāranātha viewed the Ekavyāvahārikas, Lokottaravādins, and Gokulikas as being essentially the same. He even viewed Ekavyāvahārika as being a general term for the Mahāsaṃghikas. The earlier Samayabhedoparacanaćakra of Vasumitra also regards the Ekavyāvahārikas, Gokulikas, and Lokottaravādins as being doctrinally indistinguishable.

=== Emptiness ===
The Lokottaravādins asserted that there are no real things in the world except two kinds of emptiness (Skt. śūnyatā), that is, the emptiness of a self (Skt. pudgalaśūnyatā) and the emptiness of phenomena (Skt. dharmaśūnyatā). This two-fold view of emptiness is also a distinguishing characteristic of Mahāyāna.

=== Buddhas and bodhisattvas ===
According to Vasumitra, 48 theses were held in common by these three Mahāsāṃghika sects. Of the 48 special theses attributed by the Samayabhedoparacanaćakra to these sects, 20 points concern the supramundane nature of buddhas and bodhisattvas. According to the Samayabhedoparacanaćakra, these four groups held that the Buddha is able to know all dharmas in a single moment of the mind.

In their view, the Buddha is equipped with the following supernatural qualities: transcendence (lokottara), lack of defilements, all of his utterances preaching his teaching, expounding all his teachings in a single utterance, all of his sayings being true, his physical body being limitless, his power (prabhāva) being limitless, the length of his life being limitless, never tiring of enlightening sentient beings and awakening pure faith in them, having no sleep or dreams, no pause in answering a question, and always in meditation (samādhi).

The Buddha is viewed as transcendent (Skt. lokottara) and his life and physical manifestation are mere appearance. The Lokottaravāda school upheld the Mahāsāṃghika view of the supramundane nature of the buddhas and bodhisattvas, and the imperfection and fallibility of arhats.

=== Bodhisattva Path ===
The Lokottaravādin Mahāvastu speaks of Buddhism as consisting of the Three Vehicles, and includes specific instructions regarding the Bodhisattva Path and the practices of bodhisattvas. From the Mahāvastu, we know that the Lokottaravādins had a conception of a bodhisattva's progress toward enlightenment as consisting of ten grounds, or bhūmis, as required for Mahāyāna bodhisattvas. These bhūmis described in the Mahāvastu are similar to those in the Mahāyāna Ten Stages Sūtra, but the names of these stages seem to differ somewhat.

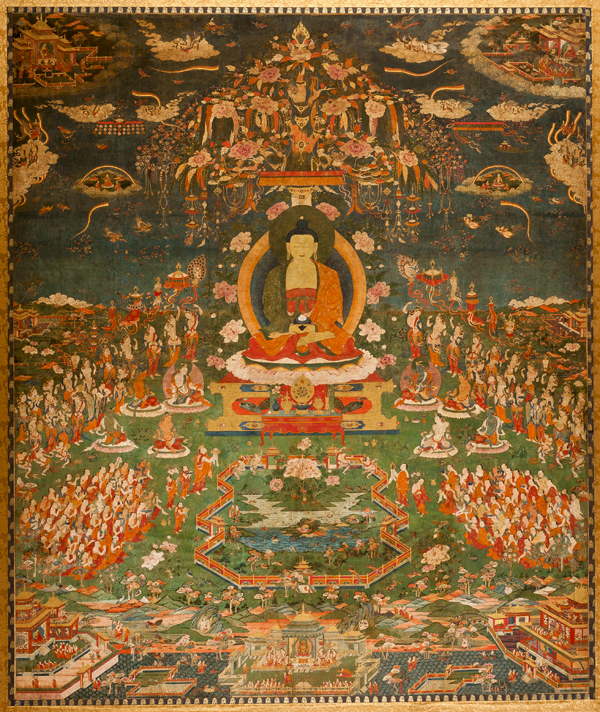
Tibetan painting of Amitābha in his Pure Land, Sukhāvatī

=== Buddha-fields ===
From the Mahāvastu, it is evident that the Lokottaravādins also held that there were innumerable Pure Lands (Skt. buddhakṣetra "buddha-fields"), throughout which there are innumerable buddhas and innumerable tenth-ground bodhisattvas who will become buddhas. Each is said to lead limitless sentient beings to liberation, yet the number of sentient beings remains essentially infinite.

=== Equality of buddhas ===
In the Mahāvastu, there are some Lokottaravādin accounts of the nature of buddhas which have strong parallels to those in Mahāyāna sūtras. In one section, a multitude of devas are described as putting up sunshades in honor of the Buddha, who in turn shows himself sitting beneath each and every one. Each deva believes himself to be particularly honored, unaware of the fictitious character of his own buddha, who is no different from the others he sees. This has a parallel with an account in the Śūraṅgama Samādhi Sūtra. In this text, the Buddha appears simultaneously on a vast number of lion-thrones prepared by various devas, but each deva sees only the Buddha that is sitting on his own throne. At the appropriate moment, all the buddhas are revealed to the devas, and one asks which is real – his own Buddha, or all the others. In the Śūraṅgama Samādhi Sūtra, the Buddha's answer is ultimately that they are all equal, because the nature of buddhas is not apart from all phenomena.

=== Future buddhas ===
In the Mahāvastu, the future buddha Maitreya is mentioned a number of times, and the text states that he will be just one of the one thousand buddhas who are destined to appear in the future following Gautama Buddha. The Mahāsāṃghika-Lokottaravāda view is contrasted with that of the Theravāda, which holds that five buddhas are destined to follow Gautama.

== See also ==
- Buddhism in Afghanistan
