= Mahāvastu =

Early Buddhist text

The Mahāvastu (Sanskrit for "Great Event" or "Great Story") is a canonical text of the Mahāsāṃghika Lokottaravāda school of Early Buddhism which was originally part of the school's Vinaya pitaka. The Mahāvastu is a composite multi-life hagiography of the Buddha Shakyamuni. Its numerous textual layers are held by scholars to have been compiled between the 2nd century BCE and 4th century CE.

The Mahāvastu was first published in the West in an editio princeps by Émile Senart between 1882 and 1897. This edition is in a language which has been termed Buddhist Hybrid Sanskrit.

== Overview ==
=== Content ===
The text is a composite one which includes past life narratives, stories of previous Buddhas, stories of Gautama Buddha's final life, embedded early Buddhist sutras and two prologues (nidānas). Over half of the text is composed of Jātaka and Avadāna tales, accounts of the earlier lives of the Buddha and other bodhisattvas.

The Mahāvastu opens with two prologues (nidānas), the Nidānanamaskāras (dating to around the 3rd century CE) and the Nidānavastu (c. 1st century CE).

Four sections of the Mahāvastu contain texts of the Bahubuddhaka sūtra genre. This includes a bahubuddhasūtra in chapter XXI of Jones' translation, Volume III and Chapter V in Jones Volume I. The Bahubuddhakasūtras are sutras which contain narratives of past Buddhas and these narratives often served as sources for Buddhist doctrines relating to the bodhisattva path. Parallel examples of Bahubuddhakasūtras have been found in Gandharan Buddhist text collections. One of these manuscripts dates to the 1st century BCE. Another parallel Bahubuddhaka sūtra is the Chinese translation Fo benxing ji jing (Taisho 190).

The Mahāvastu's Jātaka tales are similar to those of the Pali Canon although significant differences exist in terms of the tales' details. Other parts of the Mahāvastu have more direct parallels in the Pali Canon including from the Digha Nikaya (DN 19, Mahāgovinda Sutta), the Majjhima Nikaya (MN 26, Ariyapariyesana Sutta; and, MN 36, Mahasaccaka Sutta), the Khuddakapātha, the Dhammapada (ch. 8, Sahassa Vagga; and, ch. 25, Bhikkhu Vagga), the Sutta Nipata (Sn 1.3, Khaggavisāṇa Sutta; Sn 3.1, Pabbajjā Sutta; and, Sn 3.2, Padhāna Sutta), the Vimanavatthu and the Buddhavaṃsa.

The more recent layer of the Mahāvastu is the Daśabhūmika, a text which contains teachings on a scheme of bodhisattva bhūmis (stages). According to Vincent Tournier, this text was grafted into the Mahāvastu (which itself does not contain any teaching on bodhisattva stages) during the last period of textual formation (ca. 4-6th centuries CE). The Daśabhūmika seems to have originally been considered an appendix or supplement (parivāra, parisara) which later made its way into the Mahāvastu itself. A similar case occurred with the second Avalokitasūtra which shows similarities with Mahayana scriptures.

=== Buddhology ===
The Mahāvastu is considered a primary source for the notion of a transcendent (lokottara) Buddha, common to all Mahāsāṃghika schools. According to the Mahāvastu, over the course of many lives, the once-human-born Buddha developed supramundane abilities including: a painless birth conceived without intercourse; no need for sleep, food, medicine or bathing although engaging in such "in conformity with the world"; omniscience; and, the ability to "suppress karma."

In spite of this school affiliation however, the Theravadin Bhikkhu Telwatte Rahula concludes in his study of the text that its depiction of the Buddha is not that much different than the depiction of the Buddha in the Pali Canon, since the more docetic and transcendent ideas common to the Lokottaravāda are not widely present in the text.

The Nidānanamaskāras prologue introduced the doctrine of the fourfold "phases" of the bodhisattva's career. According to this doctrine, the four stages (caryās) of the bodhisattva path are:

1. Natural (prakṛti-caryā), one first plants the roots of merit in front of a Buddha to attain Buddhahood.
2. Resolution (praṇidhāna-caryā), one makes their first resolution to attain Buddhahood in the presence of a Buddha.
3. Continuing (anuloma-caryā), one continues to practice until one meets a Buddha who confirms one's future Buddhahood.
4. Irreversible (anivartana-caryā), at this stage, one cannot fall back.

== English translations ==
- Jones, J.J. (trans.) (1949–56). The Mahāvastu (3 vols.) in Sacred Books of the Buddhists. London: Luzac & Co. vol. 1, vol. 2, vol. 3

== Sources ==
- Jones, J.J. (trans.) (1949–56). The Mahāvastu (3 vols.) in Sacred Books of the Buddhists. London: Luzac & Co. volume1 volume 2 volume 3
- Keown, Damien (2013), The Encyclopedia of Buddhism, Routledge, ISBN 9781136985881
- The Editors of Encyclopaedia Britannica (1998), Mahāvastu, Encyclopædia Britannica
- Ānandajoti Bhikkhu (2007). A Comparative Edition of the Dhammapada. U. of Peradeniya. Retrieved 25 Nov 2008 from "Ancient Buddhist Texts"
- J.K. Nariman (1923), Literary History of Sanskrit Buddhism, Bombay: Indian Book Depot; pp. 11–18
- Tournier, Vincent (2012), "The Mahāvastu and the Vinayapiṭaka of the Mahāsāṃghika-Lokottaravādins" (PDF), Annual Report of the International Research Institute for Advanced Buddhology at Soka University (15)
- Tournier, Vincent (2017), La formation du Mahāvastu et la mise en place des conceptions relatives à la carrière du bodhisattva [English Abstract], Paris: École française d’Extrême-Orient (Monographies, n° 195).
- Williams, Paul (2007), Mahāyāna Buddhism: The Doctrinal Foundations, London: Routledge, ISBN 978-0-415-02537-9
