= Sang-kio-ki =

Kind of robe of sramana

Sang-kio-ki and "Ni-fo-si-na" were the costumes of śramaṇa people in India. In the 7th century, the Chinese traveler Xuanzang described Sramana's dress as three different types of robes, which were different in style and cut according to the school they belonged to. Some robes have small or large flaps, though some have narrow or wide borders. The Sang-kio-ki provides cover for the left shoulder while concealing the two armpits. On the right, it is worn closed, while on the left side it is open. It has a longer length down to the waist. The Ni-fo-si-na was a loin cloth, It was plaited in folds and fastened around the loins with a cord. It doesn't have any tassels or griddles. Different schools were using different colours of the garment, such as red and yellow.

== See also ==
- Shiladitya, 7th-century Indian king.
