= Mahāsāṃghika =

Early Buddhist school

The Mahāsāṃghika (Brahmi: 𑀫𑀳𑀸𑀲𑀸𑀁𑀖𑀺𑀓, "of the Great Sangha") was a major division (Nikāya) of the early Buddhist schools in India. They were one of the two original communities that emerged from the first schism of the original pre-sectarian Buddhist tradition (the other being the Sthavira Nikāya). This schism is traditionally held to have occurred after the Second Buddhist council, which occurred at some point during or after the reign of Ashoka Maurya. The Mahāsāṃghika Nikāya developed into numerous sects which spread throughout ancient India.

Some scholars think that the Mahāsāṃghika Vinaya (monastic rule) represents the oldest Buddhist monastic source, although some other scholars think that it is not the case. While the Mahāsāṃghika tradition is no longer in existence, many scholars look to the Mahāsāṃghika tradition as an early source for some ideas that were later adopted by Mahāyāna Buddhism. Some of these ideas include the view that the Buddha was a fully transcendent being (term "lokottaravāda", "transcendentalism"), the idea that there are many contemporaneous buddhas and bodhisattvas throughout the universe, the doctrine of the inherent purity and luminosity of the mind (Skt: prakṛtiś ćittasya prabhāsvarā), the doctrine of reflexive awareness (svasaṃvedana) and the doctrine of prajñapti-matra (absolute nominalism or pure conceptualism).

== History ==
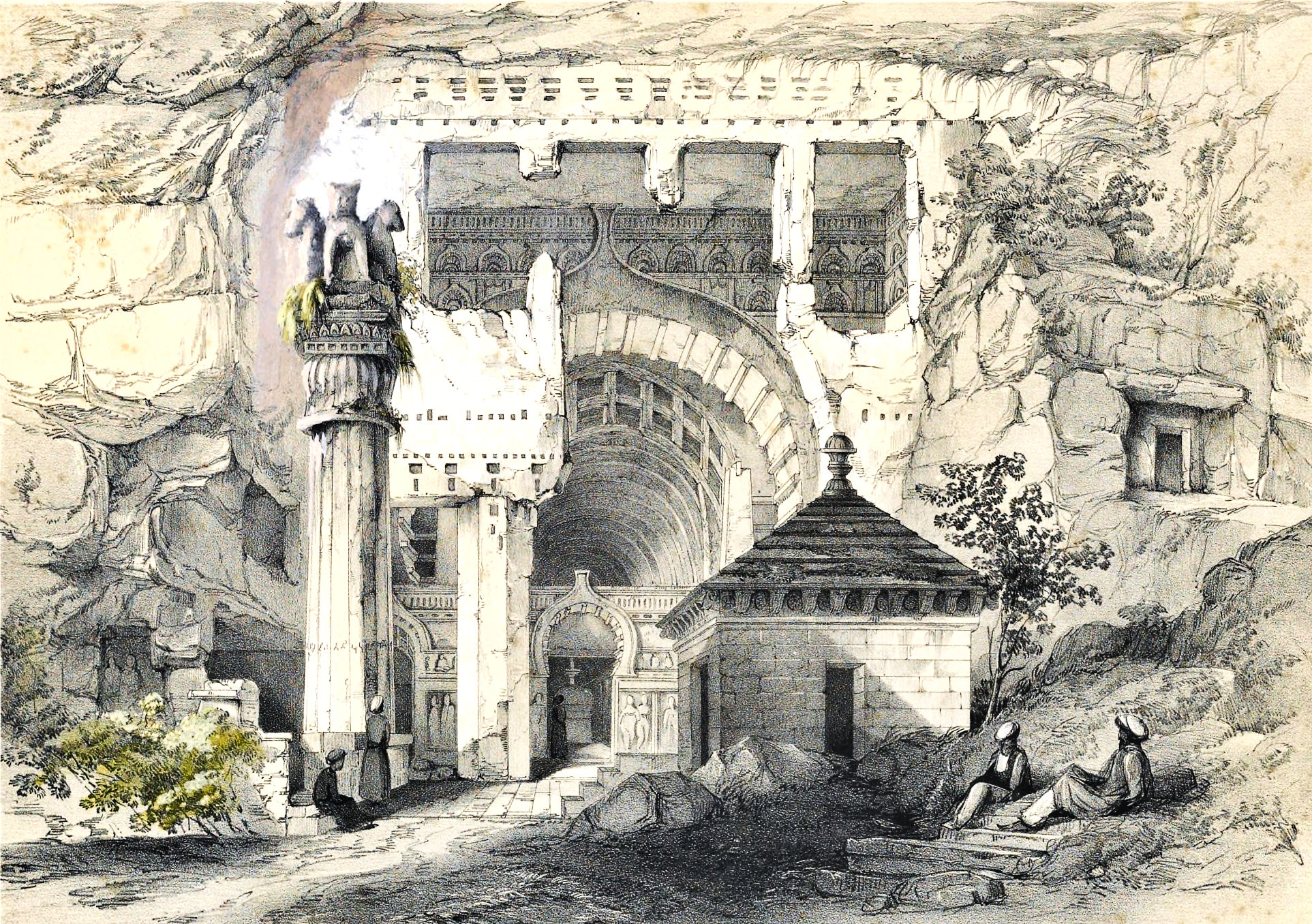
Drawing on the entrance to the Great Chaitya Cave at Karli

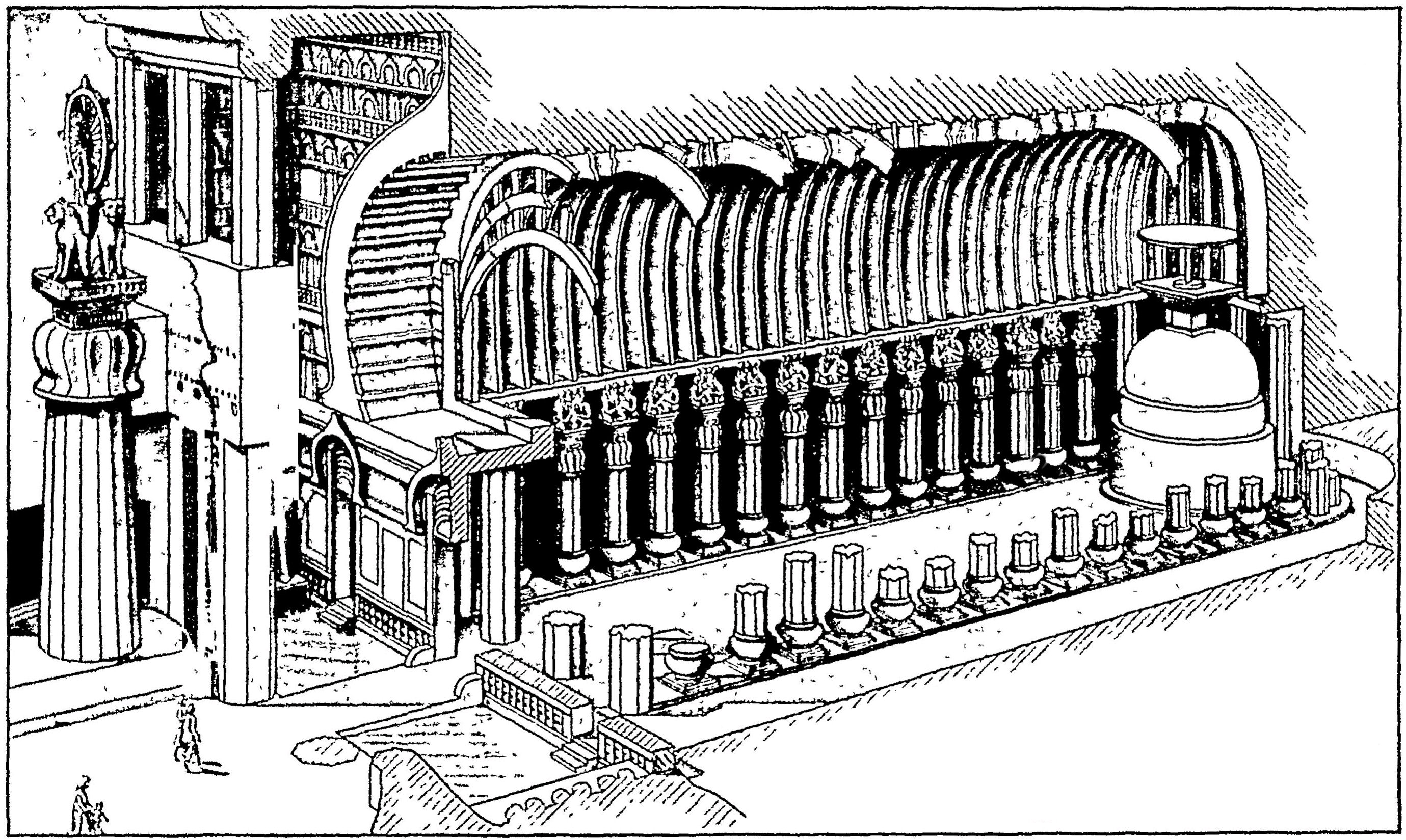
Karli Chaitya section in perspective

Most sources place the origin of the Mahāsāṃghikas to the Second Buddhist Council. Traditions regarding the Second Council are confusing and ambiguous, but it is agreed that the overall result was the first schism in the Sangha between the Sthavira Nikāya and the Mahāsāṃghika Nikāya, although it is not agreed upon by all what the cause of this split was.

According to Jan Nattier and Charles S. Prebish, the best date for the first schism and the creation of the Mahāsāṃghika as a separate community is 116 years after the Buddha's nirvāṇa.

Some Buddhist historical sources mention that the cause for schism was a dispute over Vinaya (monastic rule), mainly the desire of certain Sthaviras (elders) to add extra rules to make the Vinaya more rigorous. Other sources, especially Sthavira sources like those of the Sarvastivāda school, argue that the main cause was a doctrinal issue. They blame a figure named Mahadeva with arguing for five divisive points, four of which see arhatship as a lesser kind of spiritual attainment (which still has ignorance and desire).

Andrew Skilton has suggested that the problems of contradictory accounts about the first schism are solved by the Mahāsāṃghika Śāriputraparipṛcchā, which is the earliest surviving account of the schism. In this account, the council was convened at Pāṭaliputra over matters of Vinaya, and it is explained that the schism resulted from the majority (Mahāsaṃgha) refusing to accept the addition of rules to the Vinaya by a smaller group of elders (Sthaviras). The Mahāsāṃghikas therefore saw the Sthaviras as being a breakaway group which was attempting to modify the original Vinaya and to make it more strict. However, this text is not fully accepted by some Buddhist schools, such as the Theravāda, which instead claim that it was the Mahāsāṃghika who altered the original rules.

Scholars have generally agreed that the matter of dispute was indeed a matter of Vinaya, and have noted that the account of the Mahāsāṃghikas is bolstered by the Vinaya texts themselves, as Vinayas associated with the Sthaviras do contain more rules than those of the Mahāsāṃghika Vinaya.

Some scholars therefore agree that the Mahāsāṃghika Vinaya is the oldest, although some other scholars think that it is not the case. According to Skilton, future historians may determine that a study of the Mahāsāṃghika school will contribute to a better understanding of the early Dharma-Vinaya than the Theravāda school. According to Bhante Sujato, there is no strong evidence that the Mahāsāṃghika Vinaya is the oldest; both the Mahāsāṃghika and Theravāda Vinayas developed in parallel from shared ancient sources, each containing both older and later elements. Declaring one as definitively “the earliest” is an oversimplification not supported by the academic evidence.

Regarding the issue with Mahadeva's doctrine, this seems to have been a later doctrinal dispute within the Mahāsāṃghika community (which happened after the schism). The followers of Mahadeva seem to have been the precursors of the southern Mahāsāṃghika sects, like the Caitikas.

=== Geography ===
The original center of the Mahāsāṃghika sects was Magadha, but they also maintained important centers such as in Mathura and Karli. The Kukkuṭikas were situated in Eastern India around Vārāṇasī and Pāṭaliputra and the Bahuśrutīya in Kośala, Andhra, and Gandhāra.

The Lokottaravāda subschool itself claimed to be of the 'Middle Country', i.e. Ganges Basin region in the north of India. The Mahāsāṃghikas and the Lokottaravāda subschool also had centres in the Gandhāra region. The Ekavyāvahārika are not known from later times.

The Caitika branch was based in the Coastal Andhra region and especially at Amarāvati and Nāgārjunakoṇḍā. This Caitika branch included the Pūrvaśailas, Aparaśailas, Rājagirikas, and the Siddhārthikas.

Finally, Madhyadeśa was home to the Prajñaptivādins. The ancient Buddhist sites in the lower Kṛṣṇa Valley, including Amarāvati, Nāgārjunakoṇḍā and Jaggayyapeṭa, "can be traced to at least the third century BCE, if not earlier."

The cave temples at the Ajaṇṭā Caves, the Ellora Caves, and the Karla Caves are associated with the Mahāsāṃghikas.

== Appearance and language ==
=== Appearance ===
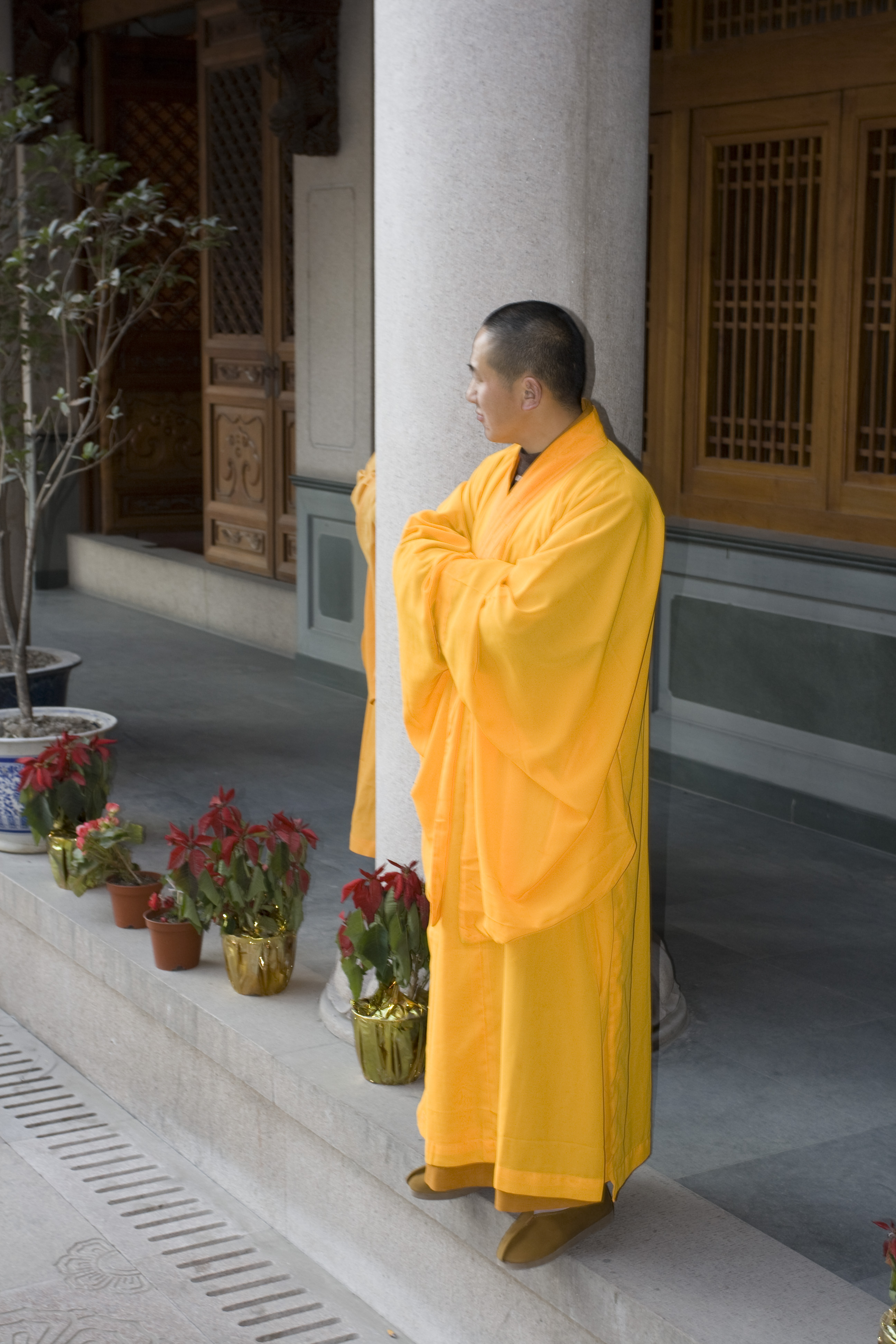
A Chinese Buddhist monk in a yellow robe. Chinese Buddhist monks often use the same color robes that some Mahāsāṃghika sects used in India.

Between 148 and 170 CE, the Parthian monk An Shigao came to China and translated a work which describes the color of monastic robes (Skt. kāṣāya) utilised in five major Indian Buddhist sects, called Da Biqiu Sanqian Weiyi (Ch. 大比丘三千威儀). Another text translated at a later date, the Śāriputraparipṛcchā, contains a very similar passage corroborating this information. In both sources, the Mahāsāṃghikas are described as wearing yellow robes. The relevant portion of the Śāriputraparipṛcchā reads:

The Mahāsāṃghika school diligently study the collected sūtras and teach the true meaning, because they are the source and the center. They wear yellow robes.

The lower part of the yellow robe was pulled tightly to the left.

According to Dudjom Rinpoche from the tradition of Tibetan Buddhism, the robes of fully ordained Mahāsāṃghika monastics were to be sewn out of more than seven sections, but no more than twenty-three sections. The symbols sewn on the robes were the endless knot (Skt. śrīvatsa) and the conch shell (Skt. śaṅkha), two of the Eight Auspicious Signs in Buddhism.

=== Language ===
The Tibetan historian Buton Rinchen Drub (1290–1364) wrote that the Mahāsāṃghikas used Prākrit, the Sarvāstivādins Sanskrit, the Sthaviravādins used Paiśācī and the Saṃmitīya Apabhraṃśa.

== Doctrines and teachings ==
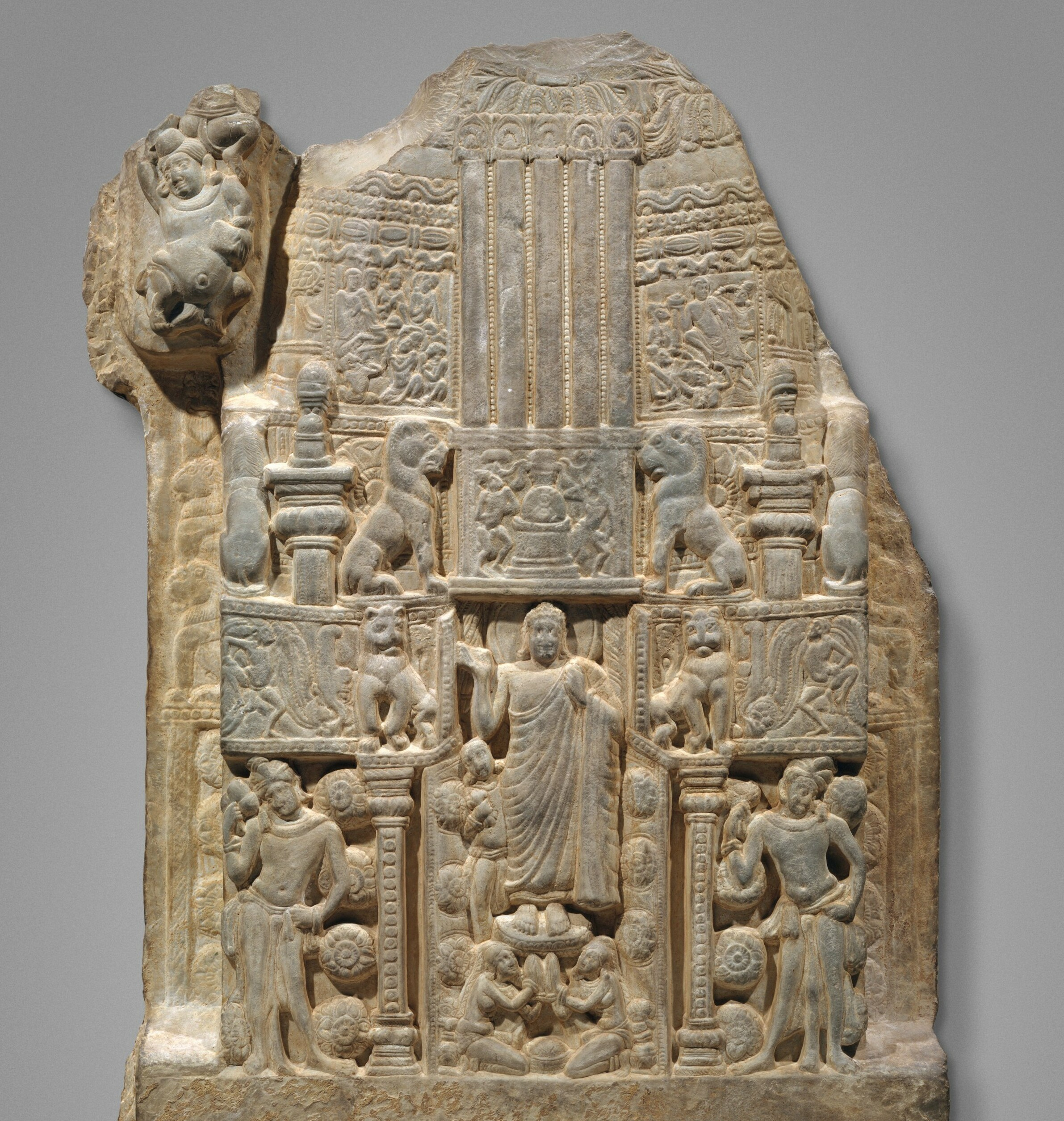
Depiction of the Buddha's descent from Trāyastriṃśa Heaven, second half 3rd century

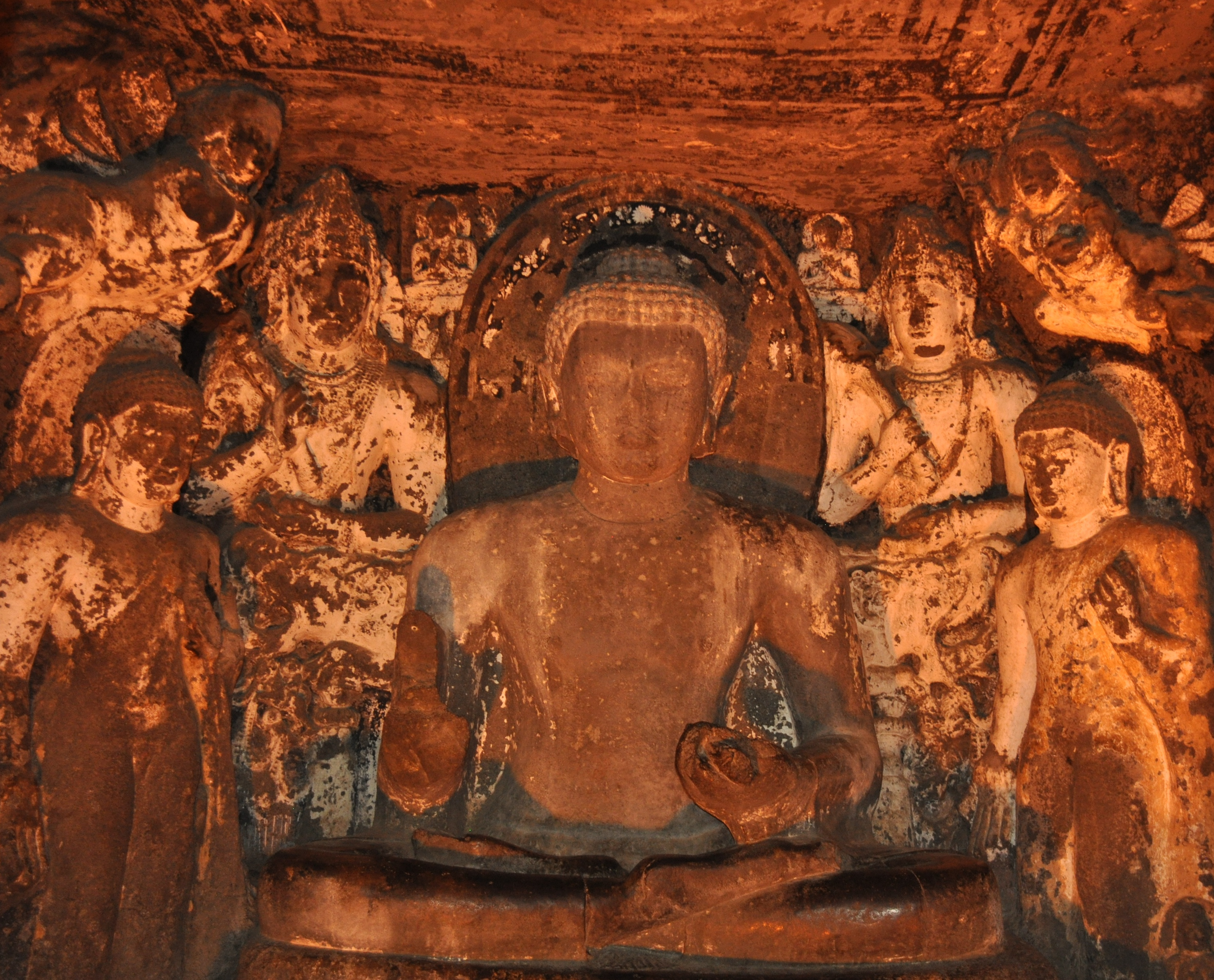
The Buddha flanked by bodhisattvas. Cave 4, Ajaṇṭā Caves, Mahārāṣtra, India.

=== List of doctrinal tenets ===
An important source for the doctrines of the Mahāsāṃghika is the Samayabhedoparacanaćakra (The Cycle of the Formation of the Schismatic Doctrines, Ch: 異部宗輪論) of Vasumitra (Sarvāstivāda scholar, c. 2nd century CE), which was translated by Xuanzang.

According to this source, some of the key doctrines defended by Indian Mahāsāṃghikas include:

1. The Buddhas is supramundane (lokottara), devoid of āsravas and the mundane natures.
2. All words spoken by Tathāgatas turn the wheel of Dharma and none of their words are false.
3. Buddhas teach all dharmas with a single sound.
4. The material body (rupakaya), supernatural power (prabhava) and lifespan (ayus) of a Buddha is unlimited (ananta).
5. The Buddha’s heart never tires of converting living beings by awakening faith (śraddhā) in them.
6. The Buddha does not sleep or dream.
7. The Tathāgata answers questions without thinking (or reflecting on things).
8. Buddhas never say a single word because they are always in samādhi, but beings rejoice, thinking that they utter words.
9. In a single moment of thought (ekaksanikacitta), Buddha comprehend all dharmas.
10. The buddhas remain in all directions. There are buddhas everywhere in the four directions.
11. When the bodhisattvas enter into a womb (garbha), they possess nothing impure and are entirely provided with organs and members, rather than developing gradually. When they enter a womb, bodhisattvas also take on the appearance of a white elephant.
12. Bodhisattvas, because they want to help beings become perfect, make vows to be reborn in bad destinations (durgati).
13. The different aspects of the Four Noble Truths are known in a single moment (ekaksanika).
14. The five sensory (indriya) faculties consist of balls of flesh, therefore only consciousness (vijñana) sees forms, hears sounds, etc.
15. There are no indeterminate (avyākṛta) things, that is, there are no dharmas that are neither good nor bad.
16. When one enters certainty [to become a buddha] (samyaktvaniyama) one has abandoned all the fetters (saṃyojana).
17. "Stream enterers" (srotāpanna) can commit all misdeeds, except for the irremediable crimes (anantarya).
18. All sūtras uttered by Buddha are nītārtha ("of plain or clear meaning").
19. Since they do not know everything (sabba), there are arhats who lack knowledge (ajñana), who have doubts (kariksa), who are saved by others.
20. The self-presence of mind is bright. It is soiled (i.e. darkened) by adventitious secondary defilement.
21. The tendencies (anusaya) are neither consciousnesses (ćitta) nor mental factors (ćaitta), and are devoid of object (anālambana).
22. The past and the future have no substantial existence (dravya).
23. There is no intermediate state (antarābhava).
24. Virtue (śila) is not mental (acetasika) and it is not consecutive to thought (ćittanuparivatti).
25. Tendencies (anusaya) are indeterminate (abyakata), not-caused (ahetuka) and disjointed from thought (ćittavippayutta).
26. There is a root-consciousness (mūlavijñāna) which serves as the support (dsraya) for eye-perception and the other sensory perceptions, like the root of the tree is the principle of the leaves, etc.
27. The current consciousnesses (pavattiviññāna) can be simultaneous (sahabhu) and do not carry karmic seeds (bīja).
28. The path (mārga) and the defilements (kleśa) appear together.
29. The act (karman) and its maturation (vipāka) evolve at the same time.
30. Material things last a long time and so go through transformation (as milk turns into curds), but mental factors and consciousnesses do not because they have a swift production and cessation.
31. Thought (ćitta) penetrates the whole body (kaya) and, depending on the object (visaya) and the support (asraya), it can contract or expand.

=== Buddhas and bodhisattvas ===
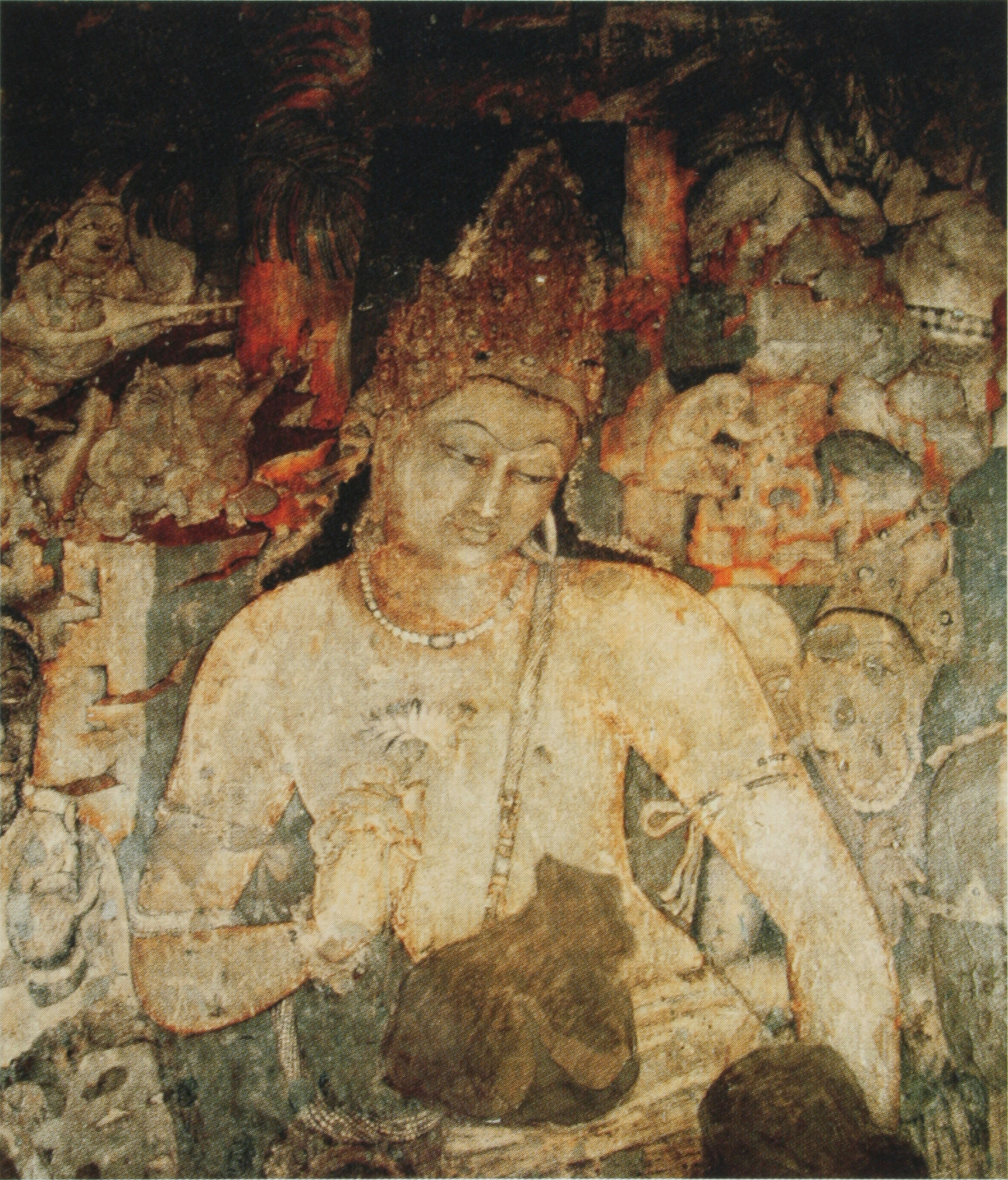
Depiction of the bodhisattva Padmapani, Ajaṇṭā Caves, Cave 1.

The Mahāsāṃghikas advocated the transcendental and supramundane nature of the Buddha and bodhisattvas, and the fallibility of arhats. Xing also notes that the Acchariyābbhūtasutta of the Majjhima Nikāya along with its Chinese Madhyamāgama parallel version is the most prominent evidence for the ancient source of the Mahāsāṃghika view of the Buddha. The Sūtra mentions various miracles performed by the Buddha before his birth and after. While the Pāli Sutta uses the term bodhisattva for the Buddha before his birth, the Chinese version calls him Bhagavān. This points to the idea that the Buddha was already awakened before descending down to earth.

Similarly, the idea that the lifespan of a Buddha is limitless is also based on very ancient ideas. The Mahāparinirvāna Sūtra states that the Buddha's lifespan is as long as an eon (kalpa) and that he voluntarily chose to give up his life. Another early source for the Mahāsāṃghika view that a Buddha was a transcendent being is the idea of the thirty-two major marks of a Buddha's body. Furthermore, the Simpsapa Sutta states that the Buddha had way more knowledge than what he taught to his disciples. The Mahāsāṃghikas took this further and argued that the Buddha knew the dharmas of innumerable other buddhas of the ten directions.

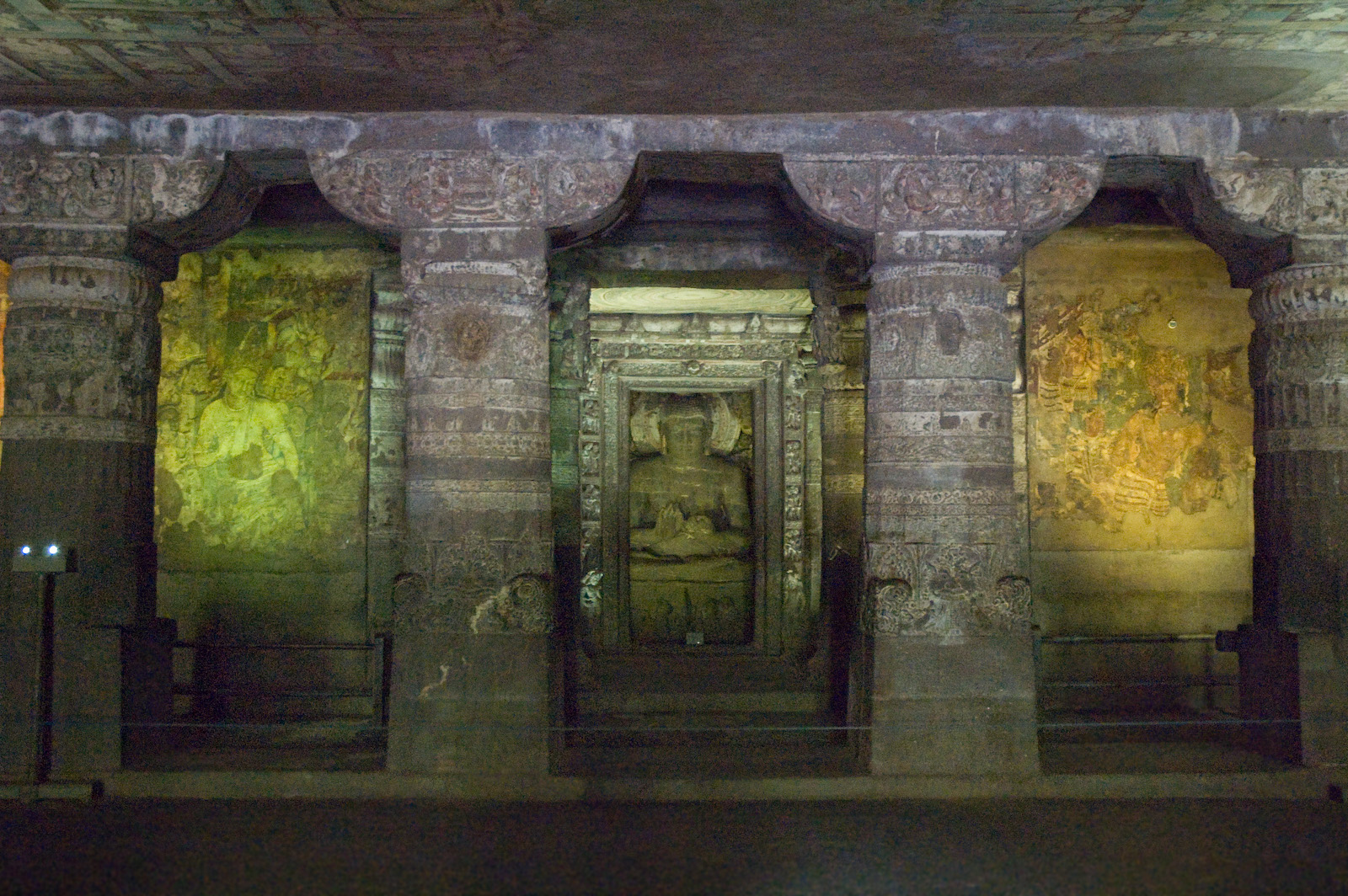
Cave 1, Ajaṇṭā Caves, Mahārāṣtra, India. The Buddha statue is flanked by bodhisattvas Padmapani (left) and Manjushri (right).

Of the 48 special theses attributed by the Samayabhedoparacanaćakra to the Mahāsāṃghikas (Ekavyāvahārika, Lokottaravāda, and Kukkuṭika), twenty concern the supramundane nature of Buddha and bodhisattvas. According to the Samayabhedoparacanaćakra, these four groups held that the Buddha is able to know all dharmas in a single moment of the mind. Yao Zhihua writes:

In their view, the Buddha is equipped with the following supernatural qualities: transcendence (lokottara), lack of defilements, all of his utterances preaching his teaching, expounding all his teachings in a single utterance, all of his sayings being true, his physical body being limitless, his power (prabhāva) being limitless, the length of his life being limitless, never tiring of enlightening sentient beings and awakening pure faith in them, having no sleep or dreams, no pause in answering a question, and always in meditation (samādhi).

A doctrine ascribed to the Mahāsāṃghikas is, "The power of the Tathāgatas is unlimited, and the life of the Buddhas is unlimited." According to Guang Xing, two main aspects of the Buddha can be seen in Mahāsāṃghika teachings: the true Buddha who is omniscient and omnipotent, and the manifested forms through which he liberates sentient beings through his skillful means (Skt. upāya). For the Mahāsāṃghikas, the historical Gautama Buddha was merely one of these transformation bodies (Skt. nirmāṇakāya), while the essential real Buddha was equated with the Dharmakāya.

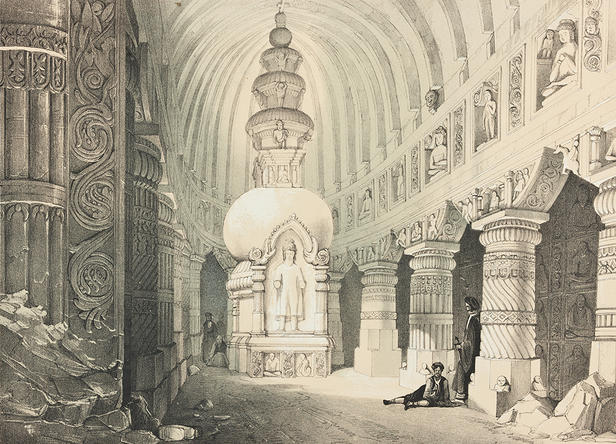
Sketch of the interior of Ajanta Cave 19 by James Fergusson (1808–1886)

The Mahāsāṃghika Lokānuvartanā Sūtra makes numerous supramundane claims about the Buddha, including that:

- He was not produced through union of father and mother, but magically produced.
- His feet never touch the ground or get dirty, his footprints are only a show.
- His body and mouth does not get dirty, he only makes a show of cleaning himself.
- He did not really suffer and struggle to attain enlightenment for six years, this was just a show.
- He never gets hungry, he only manifests this in order to allow others to gain merit by giving.
- He does not really produce human waste, this is only a show.
- His body does not grow tired, ill or old, and is not affected by cold or heat, it only appears to have these qualities.

Like the Mahāyāna traditions, the Mahāsāṃghikas held the doctrine of the existence of many contemporaneous buddhas throughout the ten directions. In the Mahāsāṃghika Lokānuvartana Sūtra, it is stated, "The Buddha knows all the dharmas of the countless buddhas of the ten directions." It is also stated, "All buddhas have one body, the body of the Dharma."

In the view of Mahāsāṃghikas, advanced bodhisattvas have severed the bonds of karma, and are born out of their own free will into lower states of existence (Skt. durgati) in order to help liberate other sentient beings. As described by Akira Hirakawa:

The Sarvāstivādin also taught that the Bodhisattva was subject to the law of karma. If one attained arhathood, he was free of the karmic law; and once the arhat died, he entered nirvāṇa never to return to the world of saṃsāra. But living in the cycle of saṃsāra, the Bodhisattva was bound to the law of karma. In contrast to this school the Mahāsāṃghika held that the Bodhisattva has already sundered karmic bondage and, therefore, is born in durgati out of his own free will, his deep vow (praṇidhāna) of salvation.

The concept of many bodhisattvas simultaneously working toward buddhahood is also found among the Mahāsāṃghika tradition, and further evidence of this is given in the Samayabhedoparacanaćakra, which describes the doctrines of the Mahāsāṃghikas. These two concepts of contemporaneous bodhisattvas and contemporaneous buddhas were linked in some traditions, and texts such as the Mahāprajñāpāramitāupadeśa use the principle of contemporaneous bodhisattvas to demonstrate the necessity of contemporaneous buddhas throughout the ten directions. It is thought that the doctrine of contemporaneous buddhas was already old and well established by the time of early Mahāyāna texts such as the Aṣṭasāhasrikā Prajñāpāramitā Sūtra, due to the clear presumptions of this doctrine.

=== Mundane and supramundane ===
The Mahāsāṃghikas held that the teachings of the Buddha were to be understood as having two principal levels of truth: a relative or conventional (Skt. saṃvṛti) truth, and the absolute or ultimate (Skt. paramārtha) truth. For the Mahāsāṃghika branch of Buddhism, the final and ultimate meaning of the Buddha's teachings was "beyond words," and words were merely the conventional exposition of the Dharma. K. Venkata Ramanan writes:

The credit of having kept alive the emphasis on the ultimacy of the unconditioned reality by drawing attention to the non-substantiality of the basic elements of existence (dharma-śūnyatā) belongs to the Mahāsāṃghikas. Every branch of these clearly drew the distinction between the mundane and the ultimate, came to emphasize the non-ultimacy of the mundane and thus facilitated the fixing of attention on the ultimate.

=== Self-awareness and the mind ===
Some Mahāsāṃghikas held a theory of self-awareness or self-cognition (svasaṃvedana) which held that a moment of consciousness (ćitta) can be aware of itself as well as its intentional object. This doctrine arose out of their understanding of the Buddha's enlightenment which held that in a single moment of mind the Buddha knew all things.

The Mahāvibhāṣa Śāstra explains the doctrine of self-reflexive awareness as follows:

Some allege that the mind (ćitta) and mental activities (ćaitta) can apprehend themselves (svabhāva). Schools like Mahāsāṃghika hold the following view: It is the nature of awareness (jñāna) and so forth to apprehend, thus awareness can apprehend itself as well as others. This is like a lamp that can illuminate itself and others owing to its nature (svabhāva) of luminosity.

Some Mahāsāṃghikas also held that the mind's nature (ćittasvabhāva) is fundamentally pure (mūlaviśuddha), but it can be contaminated by adventitious defilements. Vasumitra's Nikayabhedadharmamatićakra-Śāstra also discusses this theory, and cites the Sūtra passage which the Mahāsāṃghikas drew on to defend it. The passage is quoted by Vasumitra as:

The self-nature of the mind (ćittasvabhāva) is luminous (prabhāsvara). It is the adventitious impurities (āgantukopakleśa) that defile it. The self substance of the mind is eternally pure.

The commentary to Vasumitra by Kuiji adds the following: "It is because afflictions (kleśa) are produced which soil it that it is said to be defiled. But these defilements, not being of the original nature of the mind, are called adventitious." The Kathāvatthu (III, 3) also cites this idea as a thesis of the Andhakas.

=== Unconditioned realities ===
According to Vasumitra, the Mahāsāṃghikas held that there were nine dharmas (phenomena, realities) which were unconditioned or unconstructed (asaṃskṛta):

1. Cessation obtained through discriminative cognition (pratisaṃkhyānirodha)
2. Cesation due to absence of a productive cause (apratisaṃkhyānirodha)
3. Space (ākāśā)
4. The sphere of unlimited space (ākāśānantyāyatana)
5. The sphere of unlimited consciousness (vijñānānantyāyatana)
6. The sphere of emptiness (ākiñcanyāyatana)
7. The sphere of neither identification nor nonidentification (naivasaṃjñānāsaṃjñāyatana)
8. The own-nature of the members of dependent origination (pratītyasamutpādāṅgasvabhāva)
9. The own-nature of the members of the holy path (ārya-mārgāṅgasvabhāva)

== Texts ==
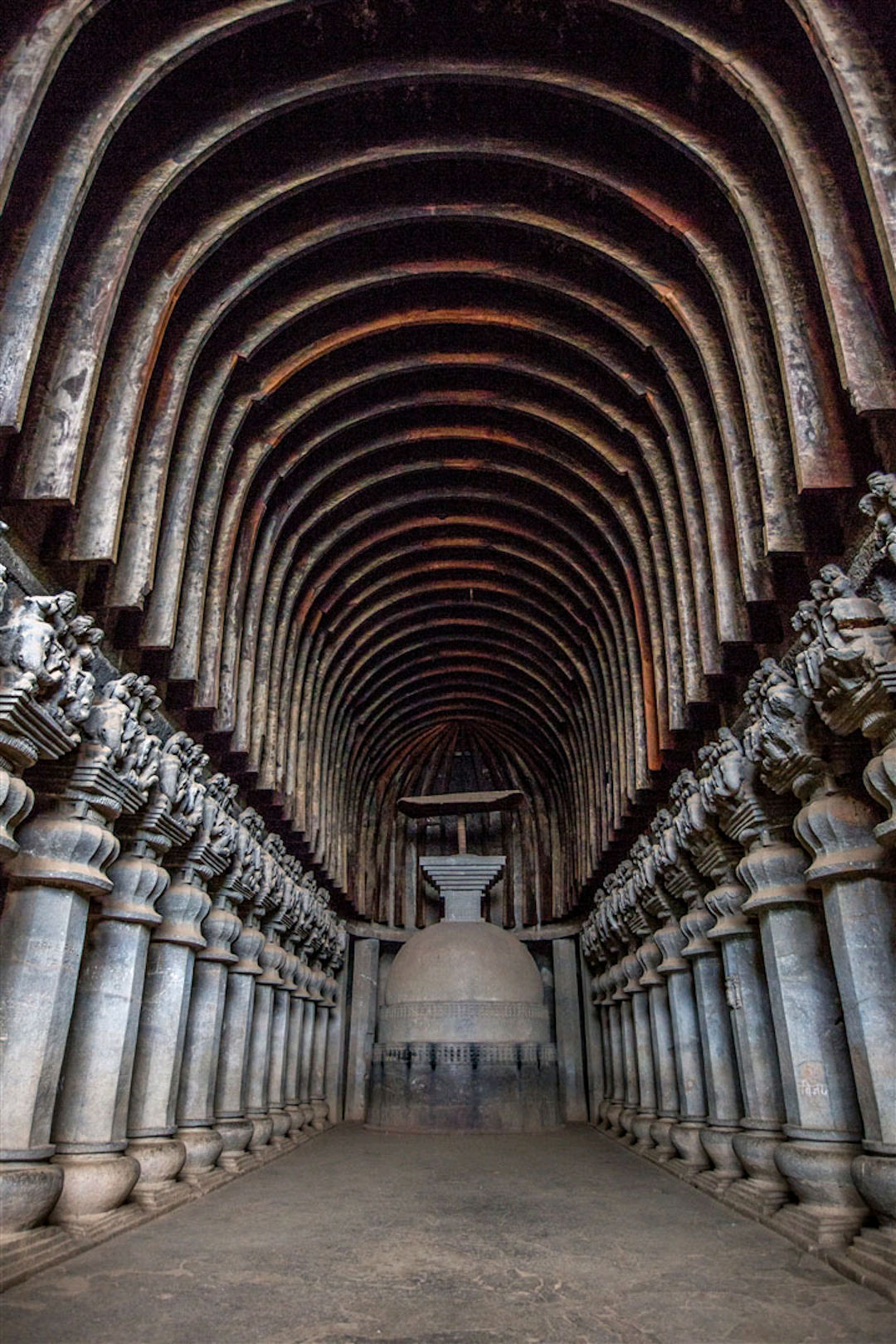
The Great Chaitya Hall at the Karla Caves in Maharashtra

According to Bart Dessein, the Mohe sengzhi lu (Mahāsāṃghika Vinaya) provides some insight into the format of this school's textual canon. They appear to have had a Vinaya in five parts, an Abhidharma Piṭaka, and a Sūtra Piṭaka:

Of these texts, their Vinaya was translated into Chinese by Buddhabhadra and Faxian between 416 and 418 CE in the Daochang Monastery in Nanjing, capital of the Eastern Jin Dynasty. In this text, their Abhidharma is defined as "the sūtrānta in nine parts" (navāṅga). This suggests that the early Mahāsāṃghikas rejected the abhidharmic developments that occurred within Sarvāstivāda circles. As is the case with their Vinayapiṭaka, also their Sūtrapiṭaka seems to have consisted of five parts (āgama): *Dīrghāgama, *Madhyamāgama, *Saṃyuktāgama, *Ekottarikāgama and *Kṣudrakāgama.

Dessein also mentions that the school probably also had a Bodhisattva Piṭaka, which included material that "in all likelihood consisted of texts that formed part of the early development of the bodhisattva path as an alternative career to that of the arhant, perhaps serving as a foundation for the later developments of the bodhisattva doctrine".

=== Vinaya texts ===
According to Zhihua Yao, the following Mahāsāṃghika Vinaya texts are extant in Chinese: Mahāsāṃghika Bhikṣuni Vinaya, Prātimokṣa Sūtra, Sphutartha Srighanacarasamgrahatika, Abhisamacarikadharma and the Mahāvastu.

Zhan Ru also notes that the Mahāsāṃghika Vinaya (Chinese: Mohe Sengqi Lü) translated by Faxian (337–422 CE) contains proto-Mahāyāna elements and "reflects the nascent formation of the Mahāyāna Dharma teachings."

The Mahāvastu (Sanskrit for "Great Event" or "Great Story") is the most well known of the Lokottaravāda branch of the Mahāsāṃghika school. It is a preface to their Vinaya Piṭaka and contains numerous Jātaka and Avadāna tales, stories of past lives of the Buddha and other bodhisattvas. It is considered a primary source for the notion of a transcendent (lokottara) Buddha, who across his countless past lives developed various abilities such as omniscience (sarvajñana), the lack of any need for sleep or food and being born painlessly without the need for intercourse. The text shows strong parallels with the Pali Mahakhandhaka.

The Śariputraparipṛcchā (Shelifu Wen Jing, 舍利弗問經, Taishō Tripiṭaka No. 1465, p. 900b), translated into Chinese between 317 and 420, is a Mahasamghika Vinaya work which also provides a history of early Buddhism and its schisms.

=== Sūtras ===
Some scholars such as Yao and Tse Fu Kuan consider the Ekottara Āgama (Taishō Tripiṭaka No. 125) to belong to the Mahāsāṃghika school, though this is still up for debate.

The Lokānuvartanā Sūtra (Chinese: 佛説内藏百寶經, pinyin: Fóshuō Nèi Zàng Bǎi Bǎo Jīng, Taishō Tripiṭaka No. 807) is a text preserved in some Sanskrit fragments as well as in Tibetan and Chinese translation.

Furthermore, another Sūtra in the Chinese canon which has similar Mahāsāṃghika themes to the Lokānuvartanā is the Pusaxingwushiyuanshengjing (Sūtra Spoken by the Buddha on (the Characteristic Marks of) His Appearance as (the Result of) Fifty Causes of the Practice of Bodhisattva).

=== Abhidharma treatises and commentaries ===
According to some sources, Abhidharma was not accepted as canonical by the Mahāsāṃghika school. The Theravādin Dīpavaṃsa, for example, records that the Mahāsāṃghikas had no Abhidharma.

However, other sources indicate that there were such collections of Abhidharma. During the early 5th century, the Chinese pilgrim Faxian is said to have found a Mahāsāṃghika Abhidharma at a monastery in Pāṭaliputra. Furthermore, when Xuanzang visited Dhānyakaṭaka, he met two Mahāsāṃghika bhikṣus and studied Mahāsāṃghika Abhidharma with them for several months. On the basis of textual evidence as well as inscriptions at Nāgārjunakoṇḍā, Joseph Walser concludes that at least some Mahāsāṃghika sects probably had an Abhidharma collection, and that it likely contained five or six books.

The Tattvasiddhi-Śāstra ("The Treatise that Accomplishes Reality"; Ch: 成實論, Chengshilun), is an Abhidharma work by a figure known as Harivarman (250–350). Some scholars including A. K. Warder, attribute the work to the Mahāsāṃghika-Bahusrutiyas, however others disagree and see it as a Sautrantika work. Chinese sources mention that he was initially a Sautrantika teacher who later lived with the Mahāsāṃghikas.

The Chinese canon also includes a sūtra commentary called the Fēn bié gōng dé lùn (分別功徳論) in the Volume 25th of the Taishō Tripiṭaka (No. 1507, pp. 30–52).

=== Manuscript collections ===
The Chinese Buddhist monk Xuanzang visited a Mahāsāṃghika-Lokottaravāda monastery in the 7th century at Bamyan, Afghanistan, and this monastery site has since been rediscovered by archaeologists. Birch bark manuscripts and palm-leaf manuscripts of texts in this monastery's collection, including Mahāyāna sūtras, have been discovered at the site, and these are now located in the Schøyen Collection. Some manuscripts are in the Gāndhārī language and Kharoṣṭhī script, while others are in Sanskrit and written in forms of the Gupta script.

Manuscripts and fragments that have survived from this monastery's collection include the following source texts:

- Prātimokṣa Vibhaṅga of the Mahāsāṃghika-Lokottaravāda (MS 2382/269)
- Mahāparinirvāṇa Sūtra, a sūtra from the Āgamas (MS 2179/44)
- Caṃgī Sūtra, a sūtra from the Āgamas (MS 2376)
- Diamond Sūtra, a Mahāyāna sūtra (MS 2385)
- Bhaiṣajyaguru Sūtra, a Mahāyāna sūtra (MS 2385)
- Śrīmālādevī Siṃhanāda Sūtra, a Mahāyāna sūtra (MS 2378)
- Pravāraṇa Sūtra, a Mahāyāna sūtra (MS 2378)
- Sarvadharmapravṛttinirdeśa Sūtra, a Mahāyāna sūtra (MS 2378)
- Ajātaśatrukaukṛtyavinodana Sūtra, a Mahāyāna sūtra (MS 2378)
- Śāriputrābhidharma (MS 2375/08)

=== Bodhisattva collection ===
Within the Mahāsāṃghika branch, the Bahuśrutīyas are said to have included a Bodhisattva Piṭaka in their canon, and Paramārtha wrote that the Bahuśrutīyas accepted both the Hīnayāna and Mahāyāna teachings. In the 6th century, Bhāvaviveka speaks of the Siddhārthikas using a Vidyādhāra Piṭaka, and the Pūrvaśailas and Aparaśailas both using a Bodhisattva Piṭaka, all implying collections of Mahāyāna texts within the Mahāsāṃghika schools. During the same period, Avalokitavrata speaks of the Mahāsāṃghikas using a "Great Āgama Piṭaka," which is then associated with Mahāyāna sūtras such as the Prajñāparamitā and the Daśabhūmika Sūtra.

== Relationship to Mahāyāna ==
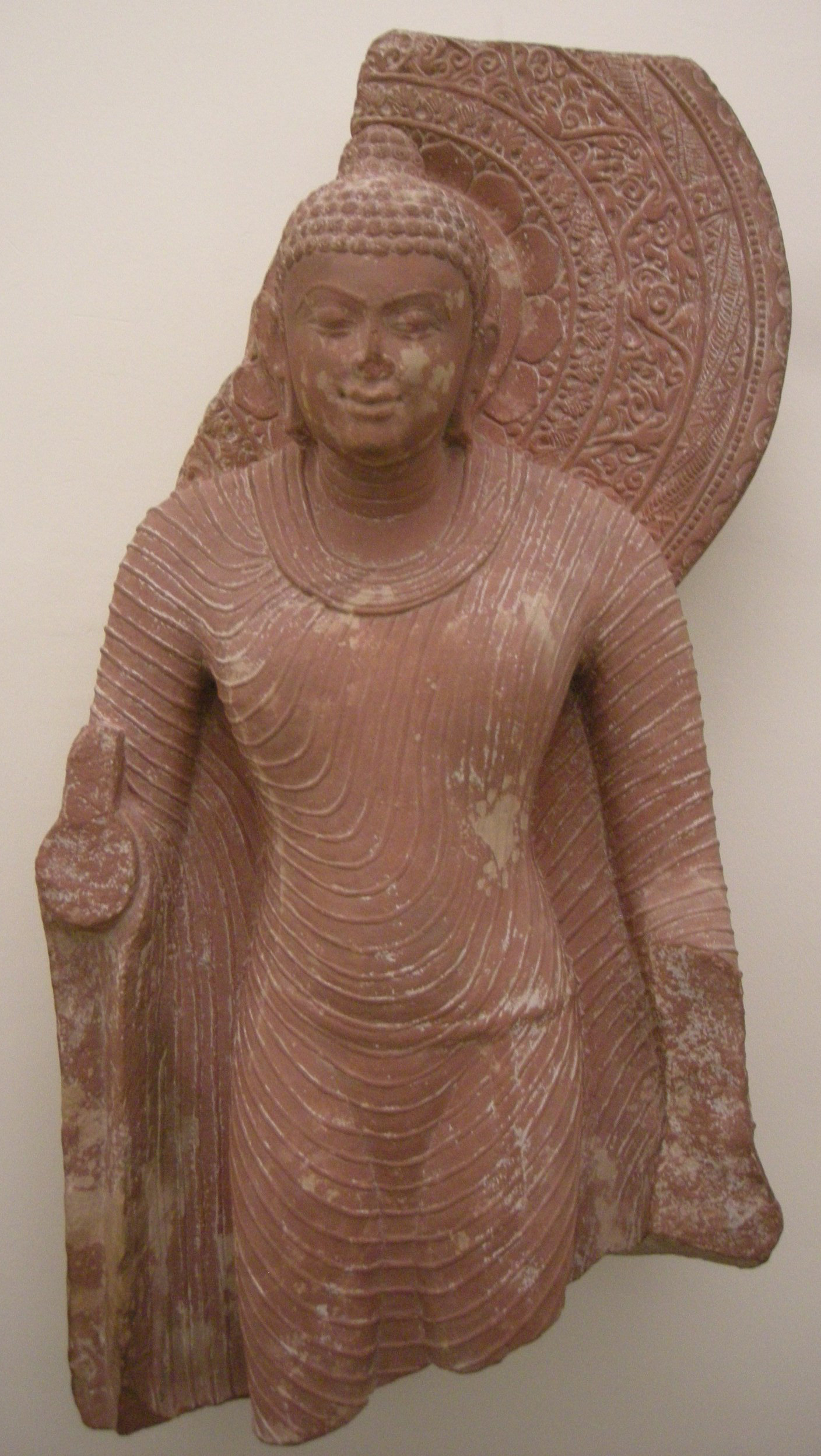
Sculpture of the Buddha from Mathura. 5th or 6th century CE.

=== Acceptance of Mahāyāna ===
In the 6th century CE, Paramārtha, a Buddhist monk from Ujjain in Central India, wrote about a special affiliation of the Mahāsāṃghika school with the Mahāyāna tradition. He associates the initial composition and acceptance of Mahāyāna sūtras with the Mahāsāṃghika branch of Buddhism. He states that 200 years after the parinirvāṇa of the Buddha, much of the Mahāsāṃghika school moved north of Rājagṛha, and were divided over whether the Mahāyāna teachings should be incorporated formally into their Tripiṭaka. According to this account, they split into three groups based upon the relative manner and degree to which they accepted the authority of these Mahāyāna texts.

Paramārtha states that the Kukkuṭika sect did not accept the Mahāyāna sūtras as buddhavacana ("word of the Buddha"), while the Lokottaravāda sect and the Ekavyāvahārika sect did accept the Mahāyāna sūtras as buddhavacana. Paramartha's report states:

In this school, there were some who believed these sutras and some who did not. Those who did not believe them ... said that such sutras are made by man and are not proclaimed by the Buddha, ... that the disciples of the Lesser Vehicle only believe in the Tripitaka, because they did not personally hear the Buddha proclaim the Greater Vehicle. Among those who believed these sutras, there were some who did so because they had personally heard the Buddha proclaim the Greater Vehicle and therefore believed these sutras; others believed them, because it can be known through logical analysis that there is this principle [of the Greater Vehicle]; and some believed them because they believed their masters. Those who did not believe [them] did so because these sutras were self-made and because they were not included in the five Agamas.

Paramārtha also wrote about the origins of the Bahuśrutīya sect in connection with acceptance of Mahāyāna teachings. According to his account, the founder of the Bahuśrutīya sect was named Yājñavalkya. In Paramārtha's account, Yājñavalkya is said to have lived during the time of the Buddha, and to have heard his discourses, but was in a profound state of samādhi during the time of the Buddha's parinirvāṇa. After Yājñavalkya emerged from this samādhi 200 years later, he discovered that the Mahāsāṃghikas were teaching only the superficial meaning of the sūtras, and therefore founded the Bahuśrutīya sect in order to expound the full meaning. According to Paramārtha, the Bahuśrutīya school was formed in order to fully embrace both "conventional truth" and "ultimate truth". Bart Dessein links the Bahuśrutīya understanding of this full exposition to the Mahāyāna teachings. In his writings, Paramārtha also indicated as much:

In the Mahāsāṃghika school this Arhat recited completely the superficial sense and the profound sense. In the latter, there was the sense of the Mahāyāna. Some did not believe it. Those who believed it recited and retained it. There were in the Mahāsāṃghika school those who propagated these teachings, and others who did not propagate them. The former formed a separate school called "Those who have heard much" (Bahuśrutīya). [...] It is from this school that there has come the Satyasiddhiśāstra. That is why there is a mixture of ideas from the Mahāyāna found there.

=== Royal patronage ===
Some early Mahāyāna sūtras reference wealthy female donors and provide evidence that they were developed in the Āndhra region, where the Mahāsāṃghika Caitika groups were predominant. The Mahāyāna Mahāmegha Sūtra, for example, gives a prophecy about a royal princess of the Śatavāhana dynasty who will live in Āndhra, along the Kṛṣṇa River, in Dhānyakaṭaka, seven hundred years after the parinirvāṇa of the Buddha.

Several scholars such as Étienne Lamotte, and Alex and Hideko Wayman, associate the Āndhra Ikṣvāku dynasty with patronage of Mahāyāna sūtras. Epigraphic evidence at Nāgārjunikoṇḍa also provides abundant evidence of royal and wealthy female donors.

=== Prajñāpāramitā ===
A number of scholars have proposed that the Mahāyāna Prajñāpāramitā teachings were first developed by the Caitika subsect of the Mahāsāṃghikas. They believe that the Aṣṭasāhasrikā Prajñāpāramitā Sūtra originated amongst the southern Mahāsāṃghika schools of the Āndhra region, along the Kṛṣṇa River. Guang Xing states, "several scholars have suggested that the Prajñāpāramitā probably developed among the Mahāsāṃghikas in Southern India, in the Āndhra country, on the Kṛṣṇa River." These Mahāsāṃghikas had two famous monasteries near Amarāvati and the Dhānyakaṭaka, which gave their names to the schools of the Pūrvaśailas and the Aparaśailas. Each of these schools had a copy of the Aṣṭasāhasrikā Prajñāpāramitā Sūtra in Prakrit. Guang Xing also assesses the view of the Buddha given in the Aṣṭasāhasrikā Prajñāpāramitā Sūtra as being that of the Mahāsāṃghikas. Edward Conze estimates that this Sūtra originated around 100 BCE.

=== Buddha-nature doctrine ===
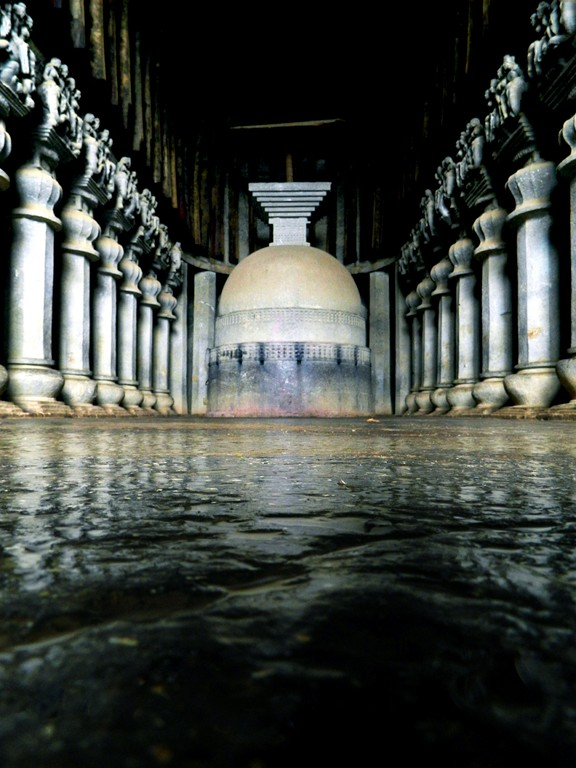
Cave complex associated with the Mahāsāṃghika sect. Karla Caves, Mahārāṣtra, India.

Brian Edward Brown, a specialist in Tathāgatagarbha doctrines, writes that it has been determined that the composition of the Śrīmālādevī Siṃhanāda Sūtra occurred during the Andhra Īkṣvāku dynasty in the 3rd century as a product of the Mahāsāṃghikas of the Āndhra region (i.e. the Caitika schools). Alex Wayman has outlined eleven points of complete agreement between the Mahāsāṃghikas and the Śrīmālādevī Siṃhanāda Sūtra, along with four major arguments for this association. Anthony Barber also associates the earlier development of the Tathāgatagarbha Sūtra with the Mahāsāṃghikas, and concludes that the Mahāsāṃghikas of the Āndhra region were responsible for the inception of the Tathāgatagarbha doctrine.

According to Stephen Hodge, internal textual evidence in the Aṅgulimālīya Sūtra, Mahābherihāraka Parivarta Sūtra, and the Mahāyāna Mahāparinirvāṇa Sūtra, indicates that these texts were first circulated in South India and then gradually propagated up to the northwest, with Kashmir being the other major center. The Aṅgulimālīya Sūtra gives a more detailed account by mentioning the points of distribution as including South India, the Vindhya Range, Bharuch, and Kashmir.

The language used in the Mahāyāna Mahāparinirvāṇa Sūtra and related texts, seems to indicate a region in Southern India during the time of the Śātavāhana dynasty. The Śātavāhana rulers gave rich patronage to Buddhism, and were involved with the development of the cave temples at Karla and Ajaṇṭā, and also with the Great Stūpa at Amarāvati. During this time, the Śātavāhana dynasty also maintained extensive links with the Kuṣāṇa Empire.

Using textual evidence in the Mahāyāna Mahāparinirvāṇa Sūtra and related texts, Stephen Hodge estimates a compilation period between 100 CE and 220 CE for the Mahāyāna Mahāparinirvāṇa Sūtra. Hodge summarises his findings as follows:

[T]here are strong grounds based on textual evidence that the MPNS (Mahāyāna Mahāparinirvāṇa Sūtra), or a major portion of it, together with related texts were compiled in the Deccan during the second half of the 2nd century CE, in a Mahāsāṃghika environment, probably in one of their centres along the western coastal region such as Karli, or perhaps, though less likely, the Amaravatī-Dhanyakaṭaka region.

In the 6th century CE, Paramārtha wrote that the Mahāsāṃghikas revere the sūtras which teach the Tathāgatagarbha.

=== Views of scholars ===
Since at least the Meiji period in Japan, some scholars of Buddhism have looked to the Mahāsāṃghika as the originators of Mahāyāna Buddhism. According to Akira Hirakawa, modern scholars often look to the Mahāsāṃghikas as the originators of Mahāyāna Buddhism.

According to A. K. Warder, it is "clearly" the case that the Mahāyāna teachings originally came from the Mahāsāṃghika branch of Buddhism. Warder holds that "the Mahāyāna originated in the south of India and almost certainly in the Āndhra country." Anthony Barber and Sree Padma note that "historians of Buddhist thought have been aware for quite some time that such pivotally important Mahāyāna Buddhist thinkers as Nāgārjuna, Dignāga, Ćandrakīrti, Āryadeva, and Bhāvaviveka, among many others, formulated their theories while living in Buddhist communities in Āndhra."

André Bareau has stated that there can be found Mahāyāna ontology prefigured in the Mahāsāṃghika schools, and has offered an array of evidence to support this conclusion. Bareau traces the origin of the Mahāyāna tradition to the older Mahāsāṃghika schools in regions such as Odisha, Kosala, Koñkana, and so on. He then cites the Bahuśrutīyas and Prajñaptivādins as sub-sects of the Mahāsāṃghika that may have played an important role in bridging the flow of Mahāyāna teachings between the northern and southern Mahāsāṃghika traditions.

André Bareau also mentions that according to Xuanzang and Yijing in the 7th century, the Mahāsāṃghika schools had essentially disappeared, and instead these travelers found what they described as "Mahāyāna." The region occupied by the Mahāsāṃghika was then an important center for Mahāyāna Buddhism. Bareau has proposed that Mahāyāna grew out of the Mahāsāṃghika schools, and the members of the Mahāsāṃghika schools also accepted the teachings of the Mahāyāna. Additionally, the extant Mahāsāṃghika Vinaya was originally procured by Faxian in the early 5th century CE at what he describes as a "Mahāyāna" monastery in Pāṭaliputra.

== Vinaya recension ==
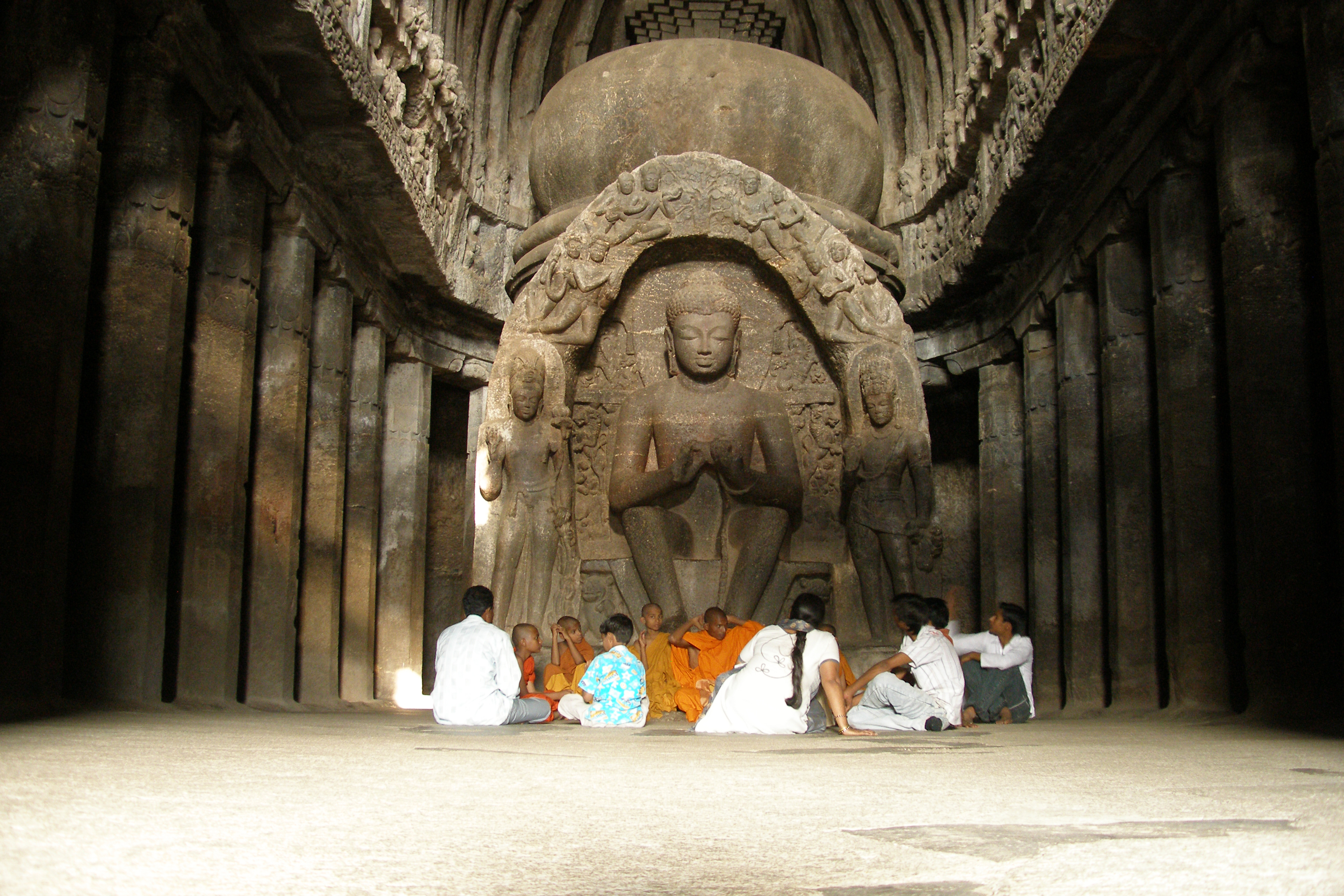
Cave temple associated with the Mahāsāṃghikas. Ellora Caves.

=== Early features ===
The Mahāsāṃghika Vinaya recension is essentially very similar to the other recensions, as they all are to each other. The Mahāsāṃghika recension differs most from the other recensions in structure, but the rules are generally identical in meaning, if the Vibhaṅgas (explanations) are compared. Some features of the Mahāsāṃghika Vinaya recension suggest that it might be an older redaction.

The Bhikṣuprakirnaka and Bhikṣuniprakirnaka and the Bhikṣu Abhisamacarikadharma sections of the Mahāsāṃghika Vinaya are generally equivalent to the Khandhakas / Skandhakas of the Sthavira derived schools. However, their structure is simpler, and according to recent research by Clarke, the structure follows a matika (matrix) which is also found embedded in the Vinayas of several of the Sthavira schools, suggesting that it is presectarian. The sub-sections of the Prakirnaka sections are also titled Pratisamyukta rather than Skandhaka / Khandhaka. Pratisamyukta / Patisamyutta means a section or chapter in a collection organised by subject; the 'samyukta-principle', like the Samyutta Nikāya / Samyukta Āgama. Scholars such as Master Yin Shun, Choong Moon Keat, and Bhikkhu Sujato have argued that the Samyutta / Samyukta represents the earliest collection among the Nikāyas / Āgamas, and this may well imply that it is also the oldest organising principle too. (N.B. this does not necessarily say anything about the age of the contents). The central premise for proposing the earliness of the Saṃyukta Āgama and Saṃyutta Nikāya is the three-aṅga theory. A detailed examination of this theory by Travagnin and Bhikkhu Anālayo concludes that the available textual evidence does not support this theory.

There are also fewer stories in general in the Vinaya of the subsidiary school, the Mahāsāṃghika-Lokottaravāda, and many of them give the appearance of badly connected obvious interpolations, whereas in the structure of the Sthavira recensions the stories are integrated into the whole scheme. In the formulations of some of the Prātimokṣa rules also, the phrasing (though generally identical in meaning to the other recensions) often appears to represent a clearer but less streamlined version, which suggests it might be older. This is particularly noticeable in the Bhikṣuni Vinaya, which has not been as well preserved as the Bhikṣu Vinaya in general in all the recensions. Yet the formulation of certain rules which seem very confused in the other recensions (e.g. Bhikkhuni Sanghadisesa 3) seems to better represent what would be expected of a root formulation which could lead to the variety of confused formulations we see (presumably later) in the other recensions. The formulation of this rule (as an example) also reflects a semi-parallel formulation to a closely related rule for Bhikṣus which is found in a more similar form in all the Vinayas (Pali Canon 64).

=== Depiction of Devadatta ===
According to Reginald Ray, the Mahāsāṃghika Vinaya mentions the figure of Devadatta, but in a way that is different from the Vinayas of the Sthavira branch. According to this study, the earliest Vinaya material common to all sects simply depicts Devadatta as a Buddhist saint who wishes for the monks to live a rigorous lifestyle. This has led Ray to regard the story of Devadatta as a legend produced by the Sthavira group. However, upon examining the same Vinaya materials, Bhikkhu Sujato has written that the portrayals of Devadatta are largely consistent between the Mahāsāṃghika Vinaya and the other Vinayas, and that the supposed discrepancy is simply due to the minimalist literary style of the Mahāsāṃghika Vinaya. He also points to other parts of the Mahāsāṃghika Vinaya that clearly portray Devadatta as a villain, as well as similar portrayals that exist in the Lokottaravādin Mahāvastu.

=== Chinese translation ===
The Mahāsāṃghika Vinaya is extant in the Chinese Buddhist canon as Mohesengzhi Lü (摩訶僧祗律; Taishō Tripiṭaka No. 1425). The Vinaya was originally procured by Faxian in the early 5th century at a Mahāyāna monastery in Pāṭaliputra. This Vinaya was then translated into Chinese as a joint effort between Faxian and Buddhabhadra in 416 CE, and the completed translation is 40 fascicles in length. According to Faxian, in Northern India, the Vinaya teachings were typically only passed down by tradition through word of mouth and memorisation. For this reason, it was difficult for him to procure manuscripts of the Vinayas that were used in India. The Mahāsāṃghika Vinaya was reputed to be the original Vinaya from the lifetime of the Buddha, and "the most correct and complete".

=== Legacy ===
Although Faxian procured the Mahāsāṃghika Vinaya in India and had this translated into Chinese, the tradition of Chinese Buddhism eventually settled on the Dharmaguptaka Vinaya instead. At the time of Faxian, the Sarvāstivāda Vinaya was the most common Vinaya tradition in China.

In the 7th century, Yijing wrote that in Eastern China, most people followed the Dharmaguptaka Vinaya, while the Mahāsāṃghika Vinaya was used in earlier times in Guanzhong (the region around Chang'an), and that the Sarvāstivāda Vinaya was prominent in the Yangzi region and further south. In the 7th century, the existence of multiple Vinaya lineages throughout China was criticised by prominent Vinaya masters such as Yijing and Dao'an (654–717). In the early 8th century, Dao'an gained the support of Emperor Zhongzong of Tang, and an imperial edict was issued that the Saṃgha in China should use only the Dharmaguptaka Vinaya for ordination.

Atiśa was ordained in the Mahāsāṃghika lineage. However, because the Tibetan Emperor Ralpacan had decreed that only the Mūlasarvāstivāda order would be permitted in Tibet, he did not ordain anyone.

== See also ==
- Schools of Buddhism
- Early Buddhist schools
- Nikāya Buddhism

== Bibliography ==
- "Arya-Mahasamghika Lokuttaravadin Bhiksuni-Vinaya"; edited by Gustav Roth, 1970.
- Mahasamghika and Mahasamghika-Lokuttaravadin Vinayas in Chinese translation; CBETA Taisho Digital Edition.
- "The Earliest Vinaya and the Beginnings of Buddhist Literature"; Frauwallner, Serie Orientale Roma, 8. Rome: Istituto Italiano per il Medio ed Estremo Oriente.
- "Vinaya-Matrka — Mother of the Monastic Codes, or Just Another Set of Lists? A Response to Frauwallner's Handling of the Mahasamghika Vinaya"; Shayne Clarke. Indo-Iranian Journal 47: 77-120, 2004.
- "A Survey of Vinaya Literature"; Charles Prebish. Originally, Volume I of The Dharma Lamp Series. Taipei, Taiwan: Jin Luen Publishing House, 1994, 157 pages. Now published by Curzon Press.
- "The Fundamental Teachings of Early Buddhism: A Comparative Study Based on the Sutranga Portion of the Pali Samyutta-Nikaya and the Chinese Samyuktagama", Choong Mun-Keat, Wiesbaden: Harrassowitz, 2000. (Contains an account of Master Yin-Shun's theory that the Samyukta Āgama is the oldest collection, by a student of Prof. Rod Bucknell.)
- "History of Mindfulness"; Bhikkhu Sujato, Taipei, Taiwan: The Corporate Body of the Buddha Educational Foundation, 2006. (Gives further evidence for the Anga-theory of Master Yin-Shun and the theory that the Samyukta / Samyutta is the oldest organising principle.)
- "Buddhist Monastic Discipline: The Sanskrit Pratimoksa Sutras of the Mahasamghikas and Mulasarvastivadins"; Charles Prebish. Volume I of the Institute for Advanced Studies of World Religions Series. University Park: The Pennsylvania State University Press, 1975, 156 pages. First Indian Edition, Delhi: Motilal Banarsidass, 1996. (This is only a translation of a small part of the Vinayas.)
- Charles Prebish and Janice J. Nattier, "Mahasamghika Origins: The Beginnings of Buddhist Sectarianism".; History of Religions, 16, 3 (February, 1977), 237–272.
- "The Pratimoksa Puzzle: Fact Versus Fantasy"; Charles Prebish. Journal of the American Oriental Society, 94, 2 (April–June, 1974), 168–176.
- "A Review of Scholarship on the Buddhist Councils"; Charles Prebish. Journal of Asian Studies, XXXIII, 2 (February, 1974), 239–254.
- "Theories Concerning the Skandhaka: An Appraisal"; Charles Prebish Journal of Asian Studies, XXXII, 4 (August, 1973), 669–678.
- "Śaikṣa-Dharmas Revisited: Further Considerations of Mahāsāṃghika Origins"; Charles Prebish. History of Religions, 35, 3 (February, 1996), 258–270.
