= Buddhist canons =

Buddhist canonical collection

Translations of Tipiṭaka
- English: Three Baskets
- Sanskrit: त्रिपिटक (Sanskrit: [tripiʈɐkɐ])
- Pali: Tipiṭaka
- Bengali: ত্রিপিটক
- Burmese: ပိဋကတ် သုံးပုံ [pḭdəɡaʔ θóʊɴbòʊɴ]
- Chinese: 三藏 (Pinyin: Sānzàng)
- Indonesian: Tripitaka, Tiga Keranjang
- Japanese: 三蔵 (さんぞう) (Rōmaji: sanzō)
- Khmer: ព្រះត្រៃបិដក (UNGEGN: preăh traibĕdâk)
- Korean: 삼장 (三臧) (RR: samjang)
- Malay: Tiga Bakul
- Sinhala: තිපිටකය (Tipitakaya)
- Tagalog: Tatlo mga kahon
- Thai: พระไตรปิฎก (RTGS: Phra Traipidok)
- Vietnamese: Tam tạng (三藏)

There are several Buddhist canons, which refers to the various scriptural collections of Buddhist sacred scriptures or the various Buddhist scriptural canons. Some of these collections are also called Tipiṭaka (Pali: [tipiʈɐkɐ]) or Tripiṭaka (Sanskrit: [tɾi.pi.ʈɐ.kɐ]) , meaning "Triple Basket", a traditional term for the three main divisions of some ancient canons. In ancient India, there were several Buddhist scriptural canons that were organized into three main textual divisions: Vinaya (monastic rule), Sutra (which contains teachings of the Buddha) and Abhidharma (which are more systematic and scholastic works). For example, the Theravada Tipiṭaka is composed of the Vinaya Piṭaka, the Sutta Piṭaka, and the Abhidhamma Piṭaka. In East Asian Buddhism meanwhile, the traditional term for the canon is Great Storage of Scriptures (traditional Chinese: 大藏經; pinyin: Dàzàngjīng).

The Pali Language Pāli Tipiṭaka maintained by the Theravāda tradition in Southeast Asia, the Chinese Buddhist Canon (written in Buddhist Chinese) maintained by the East Asian Buddhist tradition, and the Tibetan Buddhist Canon maintained by the Tibetan Buddhist tradition in Classical Tibetan are the three main important scriptural canons in the contemporary Buddhist world. The Sanskrit Nepalese canon, particularly its Buddhist Sanskrit literature has also been very important for modern Buddhist studies scholarship since it contains many surviving Sanskrit manuscripts. The Mongolian Buddhist canon (mostly a translation from the Tibetan into Classical Mongolian) is also important in Mongolian Buddhism.

While Tripiṭaka is one common term to refer to the scriptural collections of the various Buddhist schools, most Buddhist scriptural canons (apart from the Pāli Canon) do not really follow the strict division into three piṭakas. Indeed, many of the ancient Indian Buddhist schools had canons with four or five divisions rather than three. Likewise, neither the East Asian Buddhist canon nor the Tibetan canon is organized in a traditional Indian Tripiṭaka schema.

== Textual categories ==
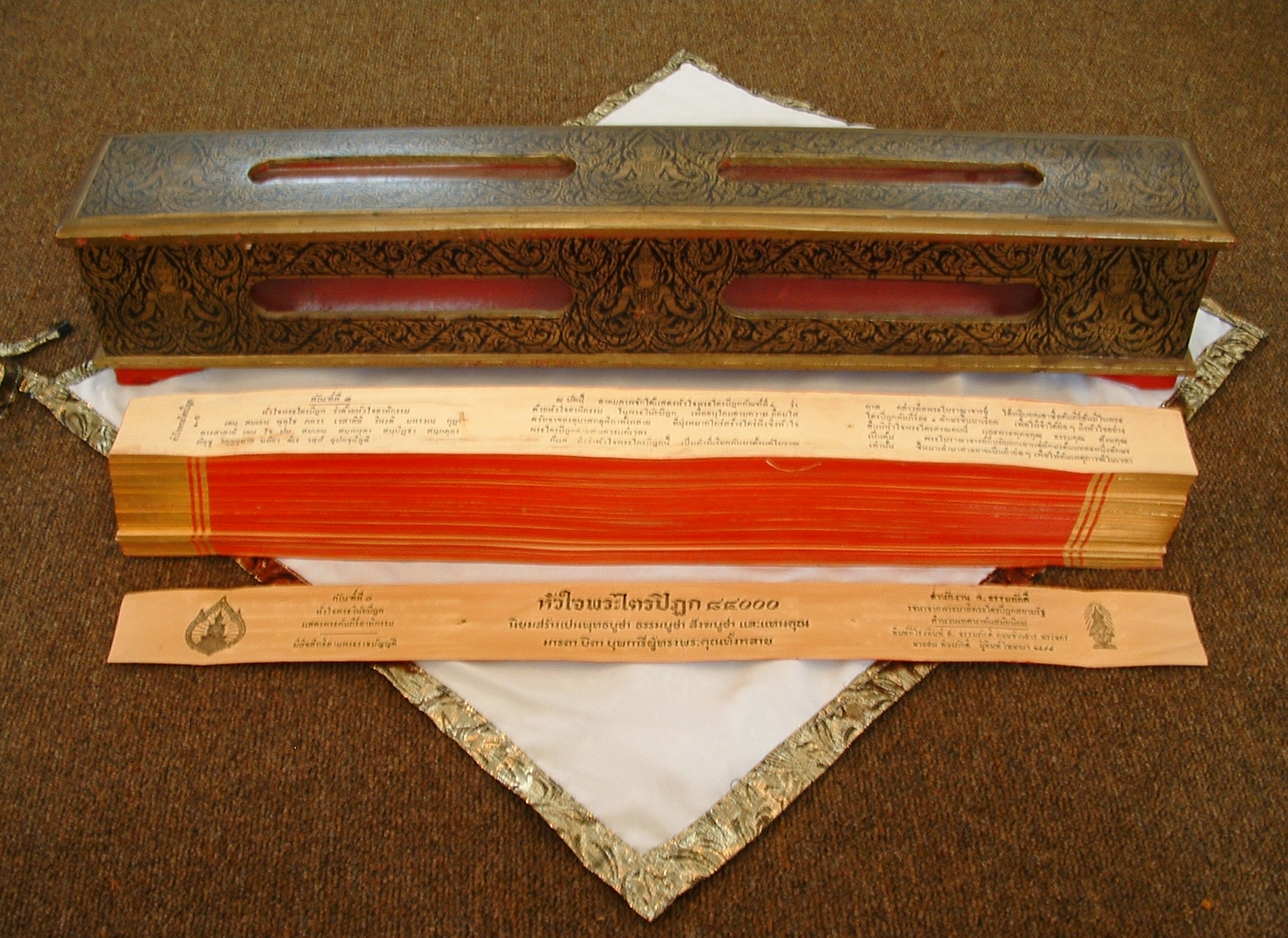
Tipiṭaka manuscript from Thailand

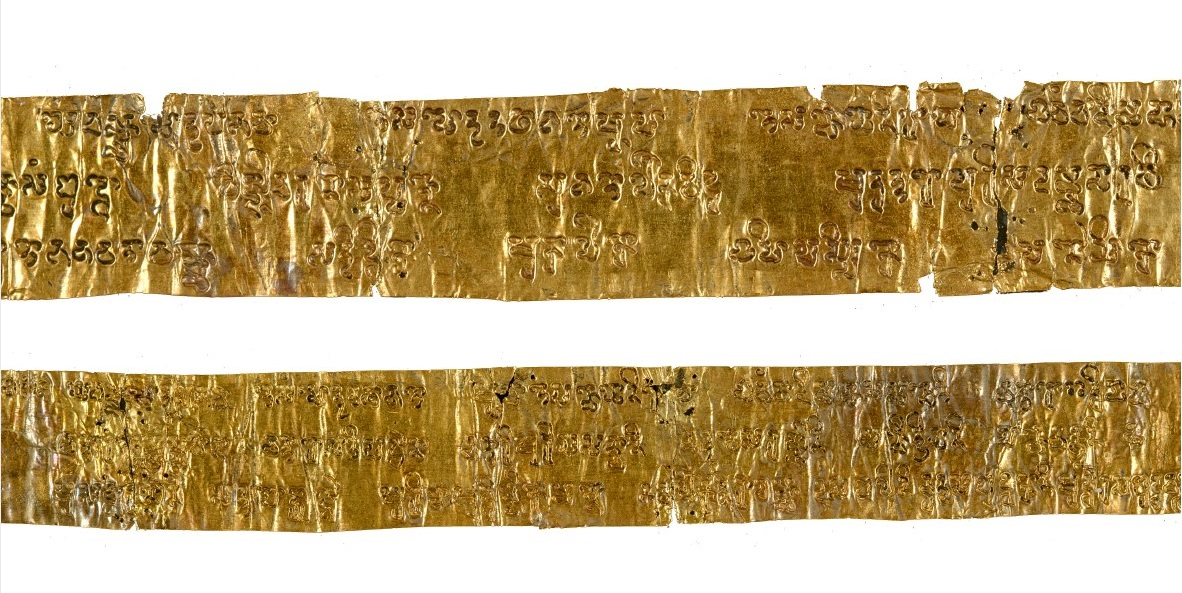
Tipiṭaka manuscripts on Gold Plates, Burma

Tipiṭaka (Pāli), or Tripiṭaka (Sanskrit: त्रिपिटक), means "Three Baskets". It is a compound of the Pali ti or Sanskrit word of tri (त्रि), meaning "three", and piṭaka (पिटक), meaning "basket". These "three baskets" recall the receptacles of palm-leaf manuscripts and refer to three important textual divisions of early Buddhist literature: Suttas, the Vinaya, and the Abhidhamma.

Sutras were the doctrinal teachings in aphoristic or narrative format. The historical Buddha delivered all of his sermons in Magadhi Prakrit. This language was related to other Prakrits like Pali, though its exact nature is not fully known. The sutras were transmitted orally until eventually being written down in the first century BCE. Even within the Sūtra Piṭaka it is possible to detect older and later texts.

The Vinaya Piṭaka appears to have grown gradually as a commentary and justification of the monastic code (Prātimokṣa), which presupposes a transition from a community of wandering mendicants (the Sūtra Piṭaka period) to a more sedentary monastic community (the Vinaya Piṭaka period). These monastic codes have been transmitted across generations by vinayadharas, that is, "Bearers of the Discipline". The Vinaya focuses on the rules and regulations, or the morals and ethics, of monastic life that range from dress code and dietary rules to prohibitions of certain personal conducts.

The Abhidharma refers to more scholastic philosophical works. Many of these texts are later than the sutras and are school specific. Hence, the Sarvastivada school's Abhidharma Pitaka contains a completely different set of texts than the Theravada school's Abhidhamma collection.

While these three textual categories were very common in the canons of the early Buddhist schools, they were not the only ones. Some schools also had additional Pitakas other than the main three. These extra Pitakas included collections of incantations, magical spells or Dhāraṇī which were called Vidyādhāra Piṭaka, Mantra Piṭaka or Dhāraṇī Piṭaka. Likewise, some Buddhist schools in India also maintained Bodhisattva Piṭakas, which contained texts that were later termed "Mahayana".

=== The twelvefold division ===
The Dvādaśāṅga ("twelvefold [scriptural] division") refers to a traditional Indian classification scheme for the Buddhist scriptures, especially in early Indian Buddhism. It outlines twelve distinct types of discourse (aṅga, “limb” or “category”) found in the Buddha's teachings. These categories are likely earlier than the later scriptural divisions. This twelvefold division appears in both Śrāvakayāna and Mahāyāna sources, including the Lalitavistara, the Mahāyāna Sūtrālaṃkāra, and the Chinese Āgama and Mahāyāna sūtra traditions. Some textual traditions have slightly different lists of aṅgas. Pali sources, for example, generally only list nine aṅgas. The aṅga categories served both as a cataloging method and as a doctrinal affirmation of the Buddha's varied pedagogical methods. According to Bhikkhu Anālayo, in early Buddhist usage the aṅgas refer to textual types rather than fulfilling the purpose of forming textual collections.

The twelve aṅgas are:

- Sūtra (lit. "thread") – Discourses in prose, often beginning with an introduction (called a nidāna) that starts with the phrase “Thus have I heard” which indicates it is being recounted and remembered by Ānanda. These present the direct teachings of the Buddha.
- Geya (lit. "song") – Mixed prose and verse; teachings are first presented in prose, followed by verses summarizing or elaborating the point.
- Gāthā (Verses) – typically standalone didactic verses or poems.
- Nidāna – Introductory explanations of the events that lead to the teaching of a particular discourse.
- Itivṛttaka ("As it was spoken") – Accounts of past lives of the Buddha's disciples, or sayings of the Buddha taught in specific circumstances.
- Jātaka – Past life stories, narrating the Buddha's previous lives as a bodhisattva.
- Abhutadharma – Accounts of the marvelous or supernatural, such as Buddha's miracles.
- Avadāna – Exemplary stories, usually of virtuous deeds and karmic results, often involving previous lives.
- Upadeśa – Detailed doctrinal teachings or instructions, usually in question and answer format. A classic teaching is typically analyzed in more extensive detail than in other scriptures.
- Udāna ("Inspired utterances"), often spontaneous exclamations made by the Buddha under specific circumstances without being asked by anyone.
- Vaipulya, "expanded" scriptures, technically meaning broad in scope, but in Mahayana traditions, this almost always refers to Mahayana sutras
- Vyākaraṇa ("prophecy", or "prediction") – Predictions, often foretelling the future awakening of disciples.

== Early canons ==
Xuanzang transporting Buddhist scriptures to China

Each of the early Buddhist Schools likely had their own versions of the Tripiṭaka. According to some sources, there were some Indian schools of Buddhism that had five or seven piṭakas.

According to Yijing, an 8th-century Chinese pilgrim to India, the Nikaya Buddhist schools kept different sets of canonical texts with some intentional or unintentional dissimilarities. Yijing notes four main textual collections among the non-Mahayana schools:

- The Mahāsāṃghika Tripiṭaka (amounting to 300,000 slokas), which were maintained in a Prakrit language or Hybrid Sanskrit
- The Sarvāstivāda Tripiṭaka (also 300,000 slokas), which was maintained in Sanskrit
- The Sthavira Tripiṭaka (also 300,000 slokas), the Pali canon is one version of this Tripiṭaka which belonged to the Southern Theravada school
- The Saṃmitīya Tripiṭaka (in about 200,000 slokas), some of the original texts of which have survived in the original language

Yijing notes that though there were numerous sub-schools and sects, the sub-sects shared the Tripiṭaka of their mother tradition (which he termed the "four principal schools of continuous tradition" or the "arya" traditions). However, this does not mean that the various sub-schools did not possess their own unique Tripiṭaka. Xuanzang is said to have brought to China the Tripiṭaka of seven different schools, including those of the above-mentioned schools as well as the Dharmaguptaka, Kāśyapīya, and Mahīśāsaka.

According to A. K. Warder, the Tibetan historian Bu-ston said that around or before the 1st century CE there were eighteen schools of Buddhism each with their own Tripiṭaka transcribed into written form. However, except for one version that has survived in full and others, of which parts have survived, most of these texts are lost to history or yet to be found.

=== Mahāsāṃghika ===
The Mahāsāṃghika (Great Community) were a major early Buddhist branch, arising from the first schism in the Buddhist sangha (which occurred at some point around the time of Ashoka). While there is no single complete collection from any of the Mahāsāṃghika school branches, there are several surviving texts including the Mahāvastu (Great Event), the Mahāsāṃghika Vinaya (translated into Chinese by Buddhabhadra and Faxian in 416 CE, Taishō Tripiṭaka 1425), the Lokānuvartanā sūtra (Taishō No. 807) and the Śariputraparipṛcchā (Taisho 1465).

Various ancient sources (like Bhāvaviveka, and Paramārtha) also indicate that the different branches of the Mahāsāṃghika tradition (such as the Bahuśrutīya) had a Bodhisattva Piṭaka in their canon. The 6th century CE Indian monk Paramārtha wrote that 200 years after the parinirvāṇa of the Buddha, much of the Mahāsāṃghika school moved north of Rājagṛha, where they became divided over whether the Mahāyāna sūtras should be incorporated formally into their Tripiṭaka. According to this account, they split into three groups based upon the relative manner and degree to which they accepted the authority of these Mahāyāna texts. Paramārtha states that the Kukkuṭika sect did not accept the Mahāyāna sūtras as buddhavacana ("word of the Buddha"), while the Lokottaravāda sect and the Ekavyāvahārika sect did accept the Mahāyāna sūtras as buddhavacana. Also in the 6th century CE, Avalokitavrata writes of the Mahāsāṃghikas using a "Great Āgama Piṭaka," which is then associated with Mahāyāna sūtras such as the Prajñāparamitā and the Daśabhūmika Sūtra.

According to some sources, Abhidharma was not accepted as canonical by the Mahāsāṃghika school. The Theravādin Dīpavaṃsa, for example, records that the Mahāsāṃghikas had no Abhidharma. However, other sources indicate that there were such collections of Abhidharma, and the Chinese pilgrims Faxian and Xuanzang both mention Mahāsāṃghika Abhidharma. On the basis of textual evidence as well as inscriptions at Nāgārjunakoṇḍā, Joseph Walser concludes that at least some Mahāsāṃghika sects probably had an Abhidharma collection, and that it likely contained five or six books.

==== Caitika ====
The Caitikas included a number of sub-sects including the Pūrvaśailas, Aparaśailas, Siddhārthikas, and Rājagirikas. In the 6th century CE, Avalokitavrata writes that Mahāyāna sūtras such as the Prajñāparamitā and others are chanted by the Aparaśailas and the Pūrvaśailas. Also in the 6th century CE, Bhāvaviveka speaks of the Siddhārthikas using a Vidyādhāra Piṭaka, and the Pūrvaśailas and Aparaśailas both using a Bodhisattva Piṭaka, implying collections of Mahāyāna texts within these Caitika schools.

==== Bahuśrutīya ====
The Bahuśrutīya school is said to have included a Bodhisattva Piṭaka in their canon. The Satyasiddhi Śāstra, also called the Tattvasiddhi Śāstra, is an extant abhidharma from the Bahuśrutīya school. This abhidharma was translated into Chinese in sixteen fascicles (Taishō Tripiṭaka 1646). Its authorship is attributed to Harivarman, a third-century monk from central India. Paramārtha cites this Bahuśrutīya abhidharma as containing a combination of Hīnayāna and Mahāyāna doctrines, and Joseph Walser agrees that this assessment is correct.

==== Prajñaptivāda ====
The Prajñaptivādins held that the Buddha's teachings in the various piṭakas were nominal (Skt. prajñapti), conventional (Skt. saṃvṛti), and causal (Skt. hetuphala). Therefore, all teachings were viewed by the Prajñaptivādins as being of provisional importance, since they cannot contain the ultimate truth. It has been observed that this view of the Buddha's teachings is very close to the fully developed position of the Mahāyāna sūtras.

==== Saṃmitīya ====
Recent manuscript findings have brought to light testimonies to Āgama material reflecting a recension belonging to the Saṃmitīya tradition. These include a version of the Sāmaññaphala-sutta of the Dīgha-nikāya (DN 2). of which the final portion has been preserved.

=== Sthavira canons ===
The Sthavira nikāya (Sanskrit "Grouping of the Elders") was a branch of the early Buddhist schools. They were one of the original two main divisions (the other being Mahāsāṃghika) during the first schism. The Sinhalese Theravāda school's Pāli Canon is the only canon of the early Buddhist schools which survived in complete form. However, individual and fragmentary texts from other Sthavira branches have survived as well.

==== Dharmaguptaka ====
A complete version of the Dīrgha Āgama (Taishō Tripiṭaka 1) of the Dharmaguptaka school was translated into Chinese by Zhu Fonian (竺佛念) based on an original read out by Buddhayaśas, a translation undertaken in the Later Qin dynasty, dated to 413 CE. It contains 30 sūtras in contrast to the 34 suttas of the Theravadin Dīgha Nikāya. A. K. Warder also associates the extant Ekottara Āgama (Taishō Tripiṭaka 125) with the Dharmaguptaka school, due to the number of rules for monastics, which corresponds to the Dharmaguptaka Vinaya. The Dharmaguptaka Vinaya is also extant in Chinese translation (Taishō Tripiṭaka 1428), and Buddhist monastics in East Asia adhere to the Dharmaguptaka Vinaya.

The Dharmaguptaka Tripiṭaka is said to have contained a total of five piṭakas. These included a Bodhisattva Piṭaka and a Mantra Piṭaka (Ch. 咒藏), also sometimes called a Dhāraṇī Piṭaka. According to the 5th-century Dharmaguptaka monk Buddhayaśas, the translator of the Dharmaguptaka Vinaya into Chinese, the Dharmaguptaka school had assimilated the Mahāyāna Tripiṭaka (Ch. 大乘三藏).

==== Mahīśāsaka ====
The Mahīśāsaka Vinaya is preserved in Chinese translation (Taishō Tripiṭaka 1421), translated by Buddhajīva and Zhu Daosheng in 424 CE.

==== Kāśyapīya ====
At the present stage of our knowledge, it is uncertain if portions of the Tipiṭaka of the Kāśyapīya school survive in Chinese translation. An incomplete Chinese translation of the Saṃyukta Āgama (T 100) by an unknown translator circa the Three Qin (三秦) period (352-431 CE) has in the past been attributed to the Kāśyapīya school. However, Bingenheimer, who has specialized on this collection, rejects the widespread attribution of T 100 to the Kāśyapīya school.

=== Sārvāstivāda ===
The Sarvāstivāda school was a major sect in North India. Since it enjoyed the patronage of Kanishka (c. 127–150 CE), emperor of the Kushan Empire, they soon became one of the dominant sects of Buddhism in north India for centuries, flourishing throughout Northwest India, North India, and Central Asia. The Sarvāstivāda school held a council in Kashmir during the reign of Kanishka II (c. 158–176). In this council, their canonical texts were rendered into Sanskrit and their main canonical Abhidharma text was composed, the Mahāvibhaṣa.

The Madhyama Āgama (Taishō Tripiṭaka no. 26) was translated by Gautama Saṃghadeva, and is available in Chinese translation as part of the Chinese canon. The Sarvāstivāda is therefore an early school for which we have substantial number of sutras. The Sārvāstivāda Vinaya Piṭaka is also extant in Chinese translation, as are the seven books of the Sarvāstivāda Abhidharma Piṭaka, including the Abhidharma Mahāvibhāṣa Śāstra (Taishō Tripiṭaka 1545), which was the main canonical Abhiodharma text of the Vaibhāṣika Sarvāstivādins of northwest India.

==== Mūlasārvāstivāda ====
The relationship of the Mūlasārvāstivāda school to Sarvāstivāda school has been a subject of discussion. At present, it is clear that their Vinayas certainly differed and the same appears to hold also for their Sūtra Piṭaka. A nearly complete collection of sūtras from the Mūlasārvāstivāda school has become accessible thanks to a recent discovery in Afghanistan of roughly two-thirds of Dīrgha Āgama in Sanskrit. The Saṃyukta Āgama (Taishō Tripiṭaka no. 99), translated by Baoyun based on an original read out by Guṇabhadra, is another Mūlasārvāstivāda text available in Chinese translation. Portions of the Mūlasārvāstivāda Tripiṭaka survive in Tibetan translation and Nepalese manuscripts. The Gilgit manuscripts appear to contain Āgamas from the Mūlasārvāstivāda school in Sanskrit. The Mūlasārvāstivāda Vinaya Piṭaka survives in Tibetan translation and also in Chinese translation (Taishō Tripiṭaka 1442). The Gilgit manuscripts also contain vinaya texts from the Mūlasārvāstivāda school in Sanskrit.

== Canons of living Buddhist traditions ==
=== Theravāda Pāli Canon ===
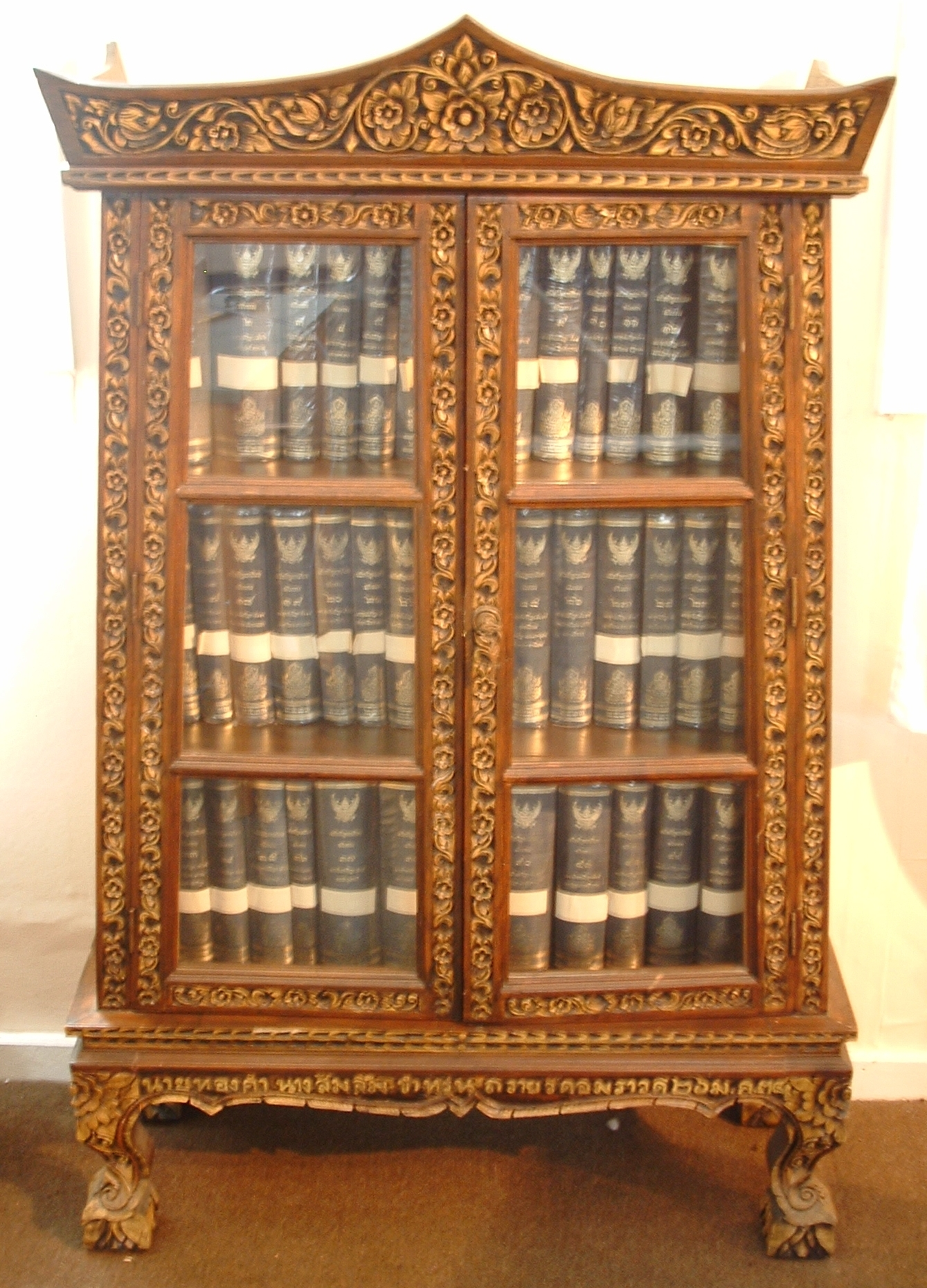
A cabinet containing a modern edition of the entire Pali Canon

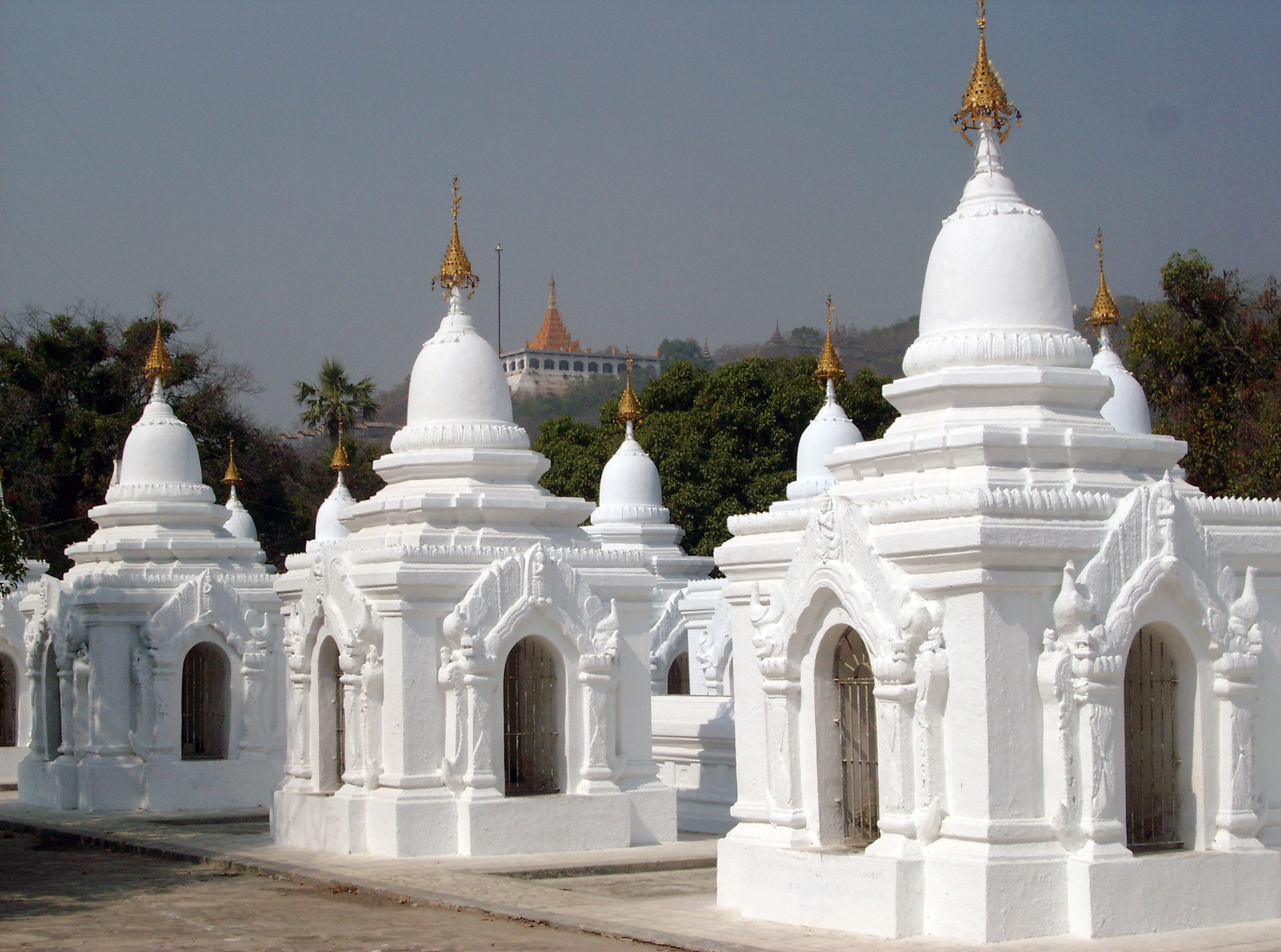
The Kuthodaw Pagoda, consisting of 729 stupas containing the world's largest book, the Tripiṭaka on marble tablets, at Mandalay, Myanmar

The Pāli Canon is the complete Tripiṭaka set maintained by the Theravāda tradition as written and preserved in Pali.

The dating of the Tripiṭaka is unclear. Max Müller states that the current structure and contents of the Pali Canon took shape in the 3rd century BCE after which it continued to be transmitted orally from generation to generation until finally being put into written form in the 1st century BCE (nearly 500 years after the lifetime of Buddha).

The Theravada chronicle called the Dipavamsa states that during the reign of Valagamba of Anuradhapura (29–17 BCE) the monks who had previously remembered the Tipiṭaka and its commentary orally now wrote them down in books, because of the threat posed by famine and war. The Mahavamsa also refers briefly to the writing down of the canon and the commentaries at this time. According to Sri Lankan sources more than 1000 monks who had attained Arahantship were involved in the task. The place where the project was undertaken was in Aluvihare, Matale, Sri Lanka. The resulting texts were later partly translated into a number of East Asian languages such as Chinese, Tibetan and Mongolian by ancient visiting scholars, which though extensive are incomplete.

Each Buddhist sub-tradition had its own Tripiṭaka for its monasteries, written by its sangha, each set consisting of 32 books, in three parts or baskets of teachings: Vinaya Pitaka (“Basket of Discipline”), Sutra Pitaka (“Basket of Discourse”), and Abhidhamma Piṭaka (“Basket of Special [or Further] Doctrine”). The structure, the code of conduct and moral virtues in the Vinaya basket particularly, have similarities to some of the surviving Dharmasutra texts of Hinduism.

Much of the surviving Tripiṭaka literature is in Pali, with some in Sanskrit as well as other local Asian languages. The Pali Canon does not contain the Mahayana Sutras and Tantras as Mahayana schools were not influential in Theravada tradition as in East Asia and Tibet. Hence, there is no major Mahayana (neither Hinayana or Pratyekabuddhayana) schools in Theravada tradition. The Tantric schools of Theravada tradition use Tantric texts independently, and not as the part of the Collection.

Some of the well known preserved Pali Canons are the Chattha Sangayana Tipitaka, Buddha Jayanthi Tripitaka, Thai Tipitaka, etc.

=== Chinese Buddhist Canon ===
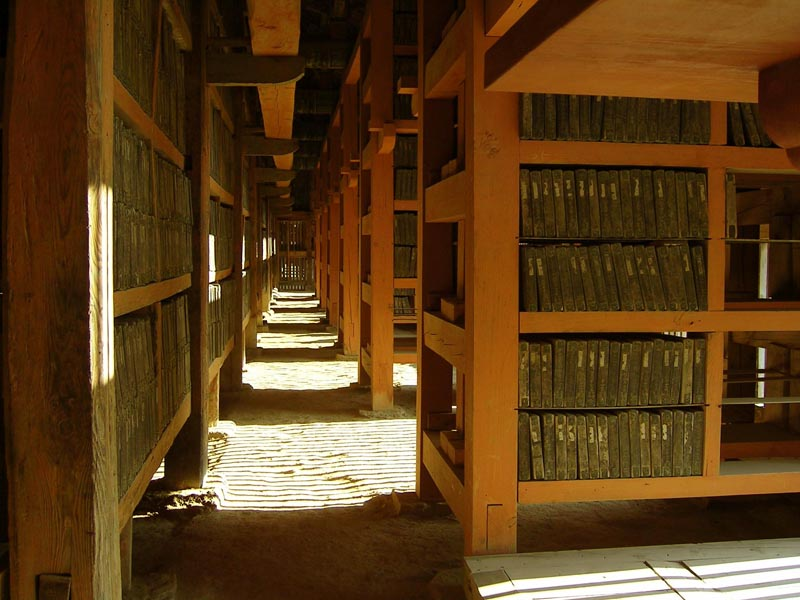
Print blocks of the Tripitaka Koreana

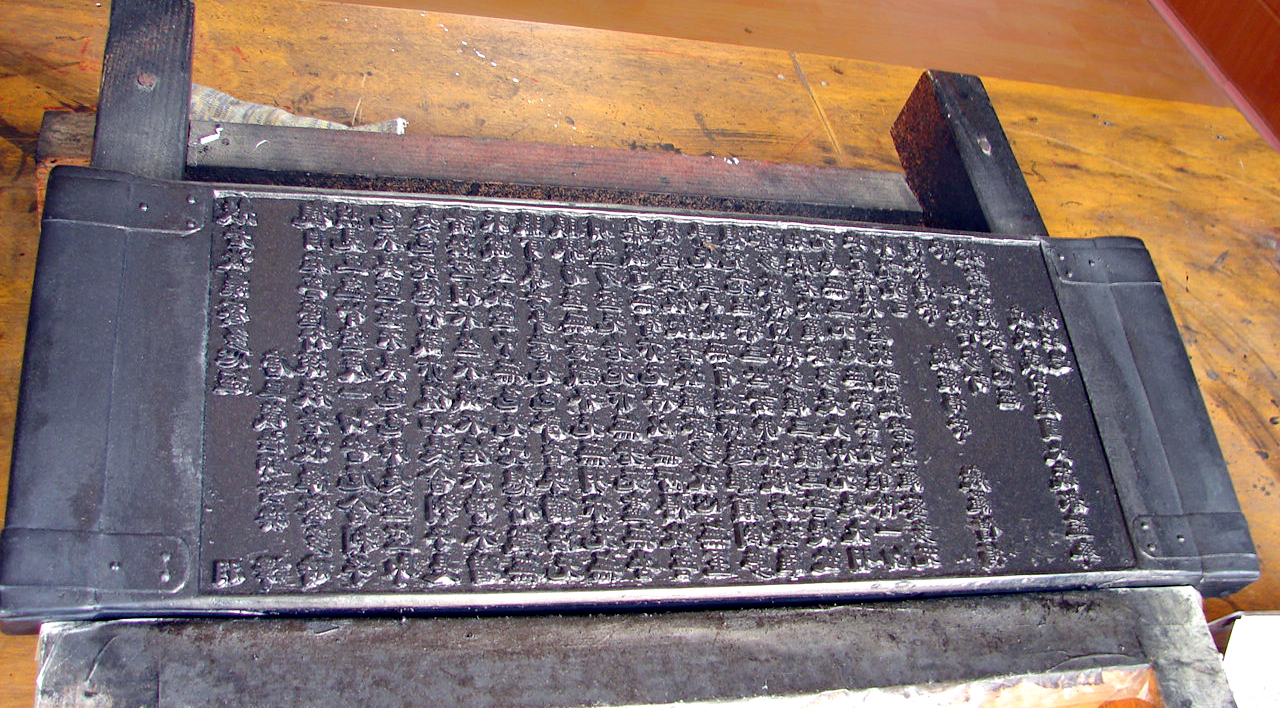
A woodblock of the Tripiṭaka Koreana in Haeinsa, Hapcheon, South Korea

The Chinese Buddhist Canon is the Tripiṭaka collection maintained by the East Asian Buddhist tradition. This canon contains texts translated from various Indian languages (such as Sanskrit and Gandhari prakrit) into Buddhist Chinese, a form of traditional literary Chinese. The traditional term for the canon is "Great Storage of Scriptures" (traditional Chinese: 大藏經; simplified Chinese: 大藏经; pinyin: Dàzàngjīng; Japanese: 大蔵経; rōmaji: Daizōkyō; Korean: 대장경; romaja: Daejanggyeong; Vietnamese: Đại tạng kinh).

Wu and Chia state that emerging evidence, though uncertain, suggests that the earliest written Buddhist Tripiṭaka texts may have arrived in China from India by the 1st century BCE. An organised collection of Buddhist texts began to emerge in the 6th century CE, based on the structure of early bibliographies of Buddhist texts. However, it was the 'Kaiyuan Era Catalogue' by Zhisheng in 730 that provided the lasting structure. Zhisheng introduced the basic six-fold division with two sets of sutra, vinaya, and abhidharma works classified as Mahāyāna and Hīnayāna. It is likely that Zhisheng's catalogue proved decisive because it was used to reconstruct the Canon after the persecutions of 845 CE; however, it was also considered a "perfect synthesis of the entire four-hundred-year development of a proper Chinese form of the Canon."

One of the most well known preserved edition of the Chinese Canon is the woodblock edition of the Tripitaka Koreana. These woodblocks became the basis for the modern edition of the Japanese Taishō Tripiṭaka, the most widely used and digitized edition for modern scholarship. The Taishō Daizōkyō is the standard modern edition as systematized by Japanese scholars, published in Japan from 1924 to 1929.

While still referred to by the traditional term "Tripiṭaka", it is actually divided into many more textual categories, including: Āgamas (equivalent to Nikāyas), Jātakas, Mahāyāna Sūtras, Esoteric texts, Vinaya, Sutra Commentaries, Abhidharma, Mahayana Śāstras (‘Treatises’), Chinese commentaries, Chinese Treatises, Histories and biographies.

In the modern era, the Chinese Buddhist Canon was translated in full into modern Korean. It was also fully translated into Japanese by Japanese scholars. While many texts have also been translated into English, many others remain untranslated.

=== Tibetan Buddhist Canon ===
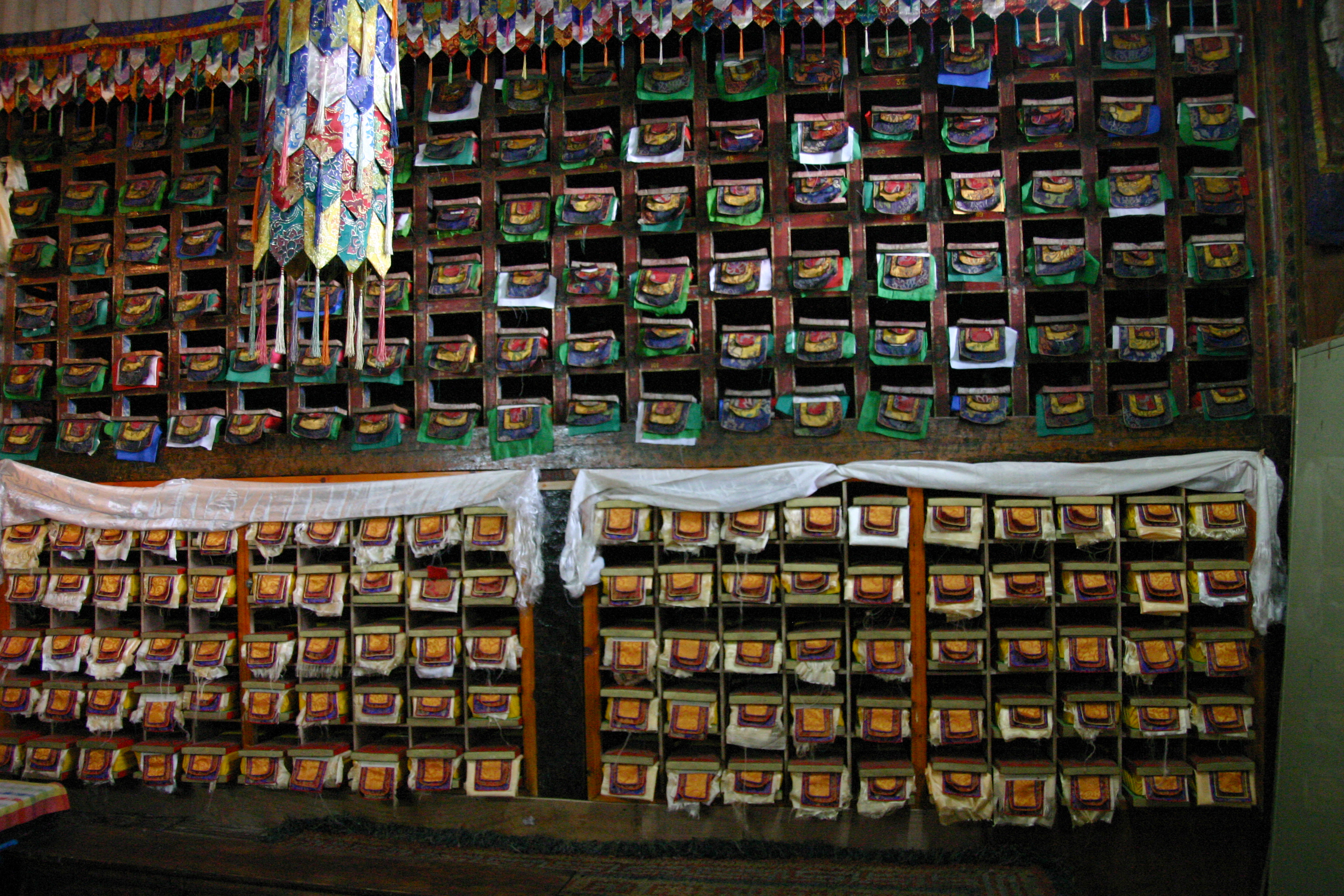
Tibetan Buddhist Tripitaka

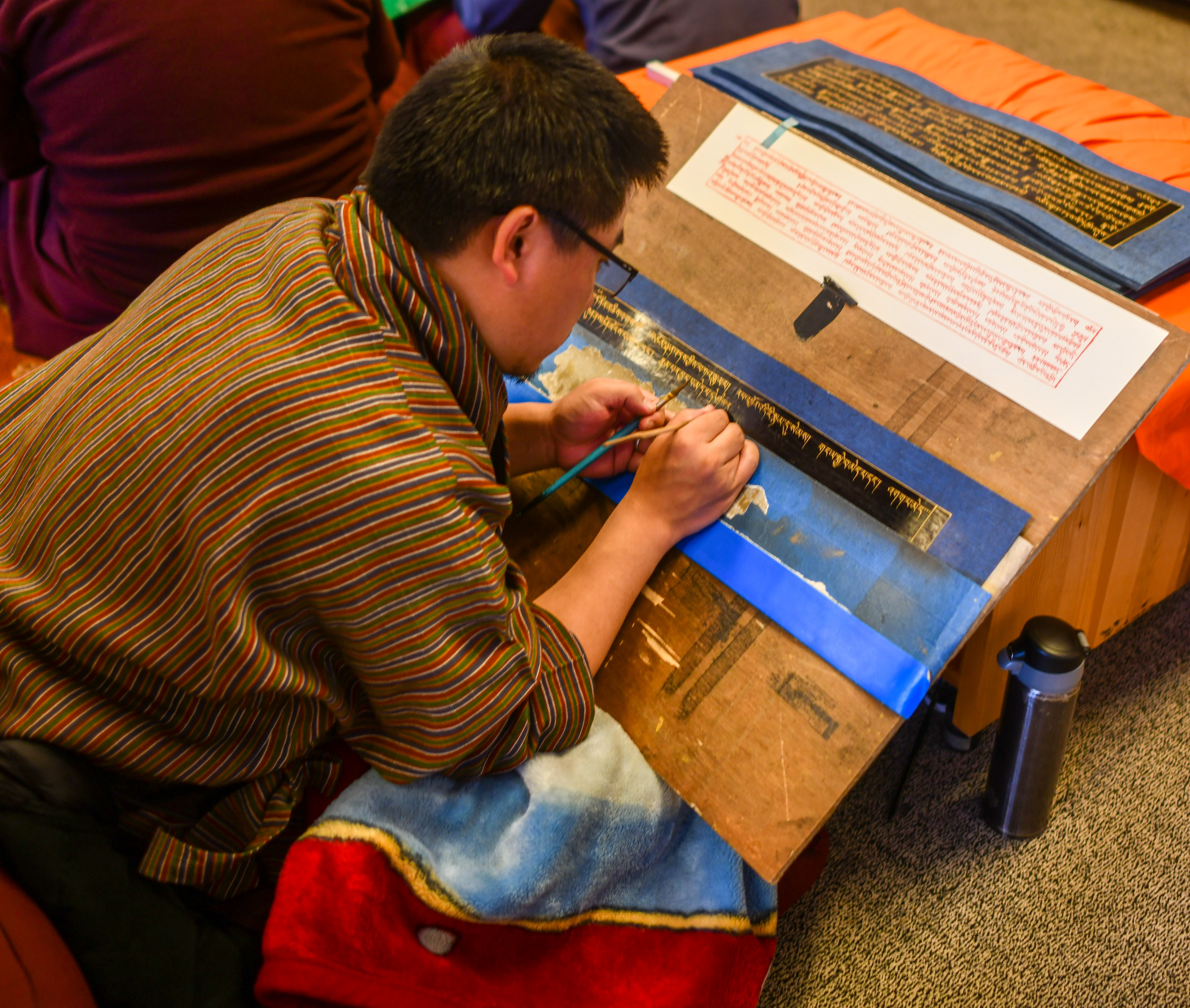
Kangyur writing with gold ink

The Tibetan Buddhist canon is a collection of sacred texts recognized by various sects of Tibetan Buddhism. In addition to sutrayana texts, the Tibetan canon includes tantric texts. The Tibetan Canon underwent a final compilation in the 14th century by Buton Rinchen Drub.

The Tibetan Canon has its own scheme which divided texts into two broad categories:

- Kangyur (Wylie: bka'-'gyur) or "Translated Words or Vacana", consists of works supposed to have been said by the Buddha himself. All texts presumably have a Sanskrit original, although in many cases the Tibetan text was translated from Chinese from Chinese Canon, Pali from Pali Canon or other languages.
- Tengyur (Wylie: bstan-'gyur) or "Translated Treatises or Shastras", is the section to which were assigned commentaries, treatises and abhidharma works (both Mahayana and non-Mahayana). The Tengyur contains 3,626 texts in 224 Volumes.

There many editions of the Tibetan Canon, some of the major editions include the Derge edition, the Lhasa edition, the Peking edition and the Jiang edition.

The Tibetan Kangyur and Tengyur were also translated into Classical Mongolian, and these texts compose the Mongolian Buddhist Canon.

=== Mongolian Canon ===
The Mongolian Buddhist Canon is a corpus of classical Mongolian Buddhist translations central to the Buddhist tradition in Mongolia. It is mostly based on the Tibetan Buddhist canon but also contains texts not found in the standard Tibetan canon collections. Like the Tibetan canon, the Mongolian canon consists of two major divisions: the Kanjur (translated words of the Buddha) and the Tenjur (commentaries and treatises by Indian and Tibetan masters). Tibetan texts were translated into classical Mongolian from Tibetan beginning in the Yuan dynasty. But the translation of the canon was not finished until the 17th century, when Ligdan Khan and the Gelug school of Tibetan Buddhism in Mongolia, led by leader Zanabazar, supervised a translation project. The Mongolian canon was fully completed when the Chinese Qianlong Emperor (1711–99), the fifth Emperor of the Qing dynasty (1636–1912), supervised a grand project to finish translating and then to print the Mongolian canon (with woodblock printing technology).

=== Nepalese Sanskrit Buddhist Canon ===
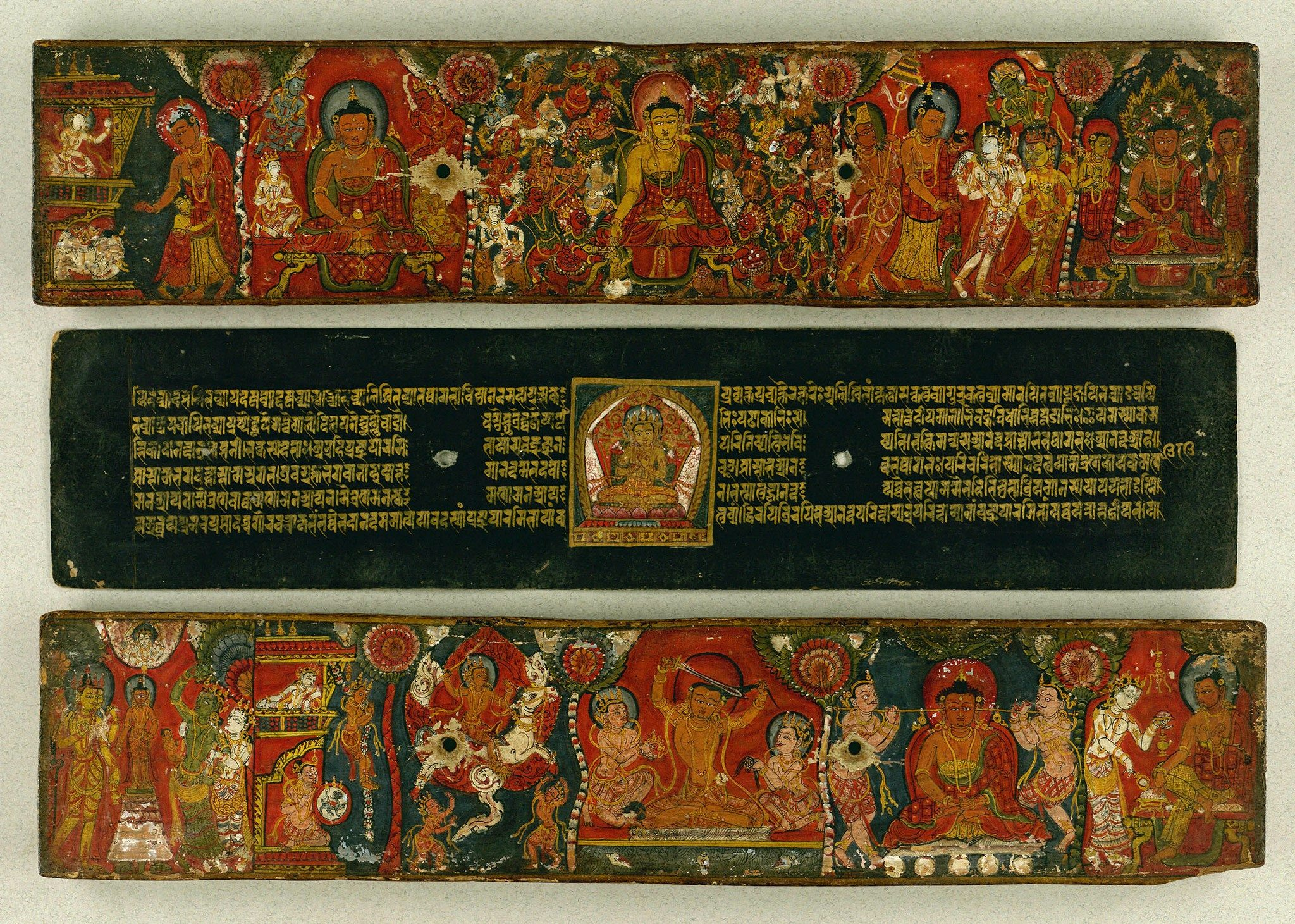
Painted covers and single folio from the Aṣṭasāhasrikā Prajñāpāramitā manuscript from Nepal, dated 1511. Royal Library, Denmark

The Newar Buddhist tradition of Nepal has preserved many Buddhist texts in Sanskrit. The Nepalese Buddhist textual tradition is a unique collection of Buddhist texts preserved primarily in Nepal, particularly within the Newar Buddhist community of the Kathmandu Valley. It is distinct for its emphasis on preserving the Sanskrit originals of many Mahayana and Vajrayana scriptures, which have otherwise been lost in India and survived only in translations in regions like Tibet and China. The Newars have continued to copy Sanskrit manuscripts up to the present day.

The Kathmandu Valley has long been a center for Buddhist scholarship, particularly following the destruction of Indian monasteries after the 12th-century Muslim conquests. Tibetan scholars often visited to acquire texts, and local Newar Buddhists, including householder clergy (śākyabhikṣus and vajrācāryas), were proficient in Sanskrit, making it a significant language for Buddhist scholarship in the region. From the 19th century onwards, Sanskrit manuscripts from Nepal were collected and sent to academic institutions in Calcutta and Europe by figures like Brian H. Hodgson, contributing to modern Buddhist studies. However, the focus of modern Newar Buddhist literature was largely on local compositions in the Newari vernacular, reflecting the distinct practices of Newar Buddhism. Newar texts often used bilingual formats, integrating Sanskrit and Newari, and employed diverse calligraphic scripts like Newā Lipi and Rañjana.

==== Digital Sanskrit Buddhist Canon ====
A recent digital humanities project is compiling a Sanskrit Buddhist canon based on surviving Sanskrit Buddhist literature. The University of the West, in collaboration with the Nagarjuna Institute in Kathmandu, Nepal, has worked to digitize and distribute Sanskrit scriptures into the Digital Sanskrit Buddhist Canon (DSBC) project. The scope of the DSBC project is vast, encompassing the digitization of at least 600 Mahayana Buddhist sutras that have survived in Sanskrit. As of now, the DSBC has successfully digitized over 604 texts, equating to roughly 50,000 pages, with more than 369 scriptures available on its official website. The collection continues to expand as additional texts are digitized and made accessible to the public.

== As a title ==
The Chinese form of Tripiṭaka, "sānzàng" (三藏), was sometimes used as an honorary title for a Buddhist monk who has mastered the teachings of the Tripiṭaka. In Chinese culture, this is notable in the case of the Tang Dynasty monk Xuanzang, whose pilgrimage to India to study and bring Buddhist texts back to China was portrayed in the novel Journey to the West as "Tang Sanzang" (Tang Dynasty Tripiṭaka Master). Due to the popularity of the novel, the term "sānzàng" is often erroneously understood as a name of the monk Xuanzang. One such screen version of this is the popular 1979 Monkey (TV series).

The modern Indian scholar Rahul Sankrityayan is sometimes referred to as Tripiṭakacharya in reflection of his familiarity with the Tripiṭaka.

== See also ==
- Āgama (Buddhism)
- Early Buddhist Texts
- Buddhist texts
- Pāli Canon
- Tripiṭaka tablets at Kuthodaw Pagoda
- Tripiṭaka Koreana
- Zhaocheng Jin Tripiṭaka
- Pali Text Society
- Dhamma Society Fund
- Xuanzang
