= Dirgha Agama =

Buddhist scriptures

The Dīrgha Āgama is one of the found Buddhist Āgamas of the Sūtra Piṭaka. It collects "long" discourses and corresponds to the Dīgha Nikāya of the Pāli Canon. Two versions of the Dīrgha Āgama have been preserved: A translation into Chinese of a Dharmaguptaka recension and substantial Sanskrit manuscript findings of a Mūlasarvāstivāda version.

== The Chinese Dīrgha Āgama (T 1) ==
A Chinese translation of a Dīrgha Āgama text attributed to the Dharmaguptaka school is included in the Chinese Buddhist canon as T 1, 長阿含經. This translation was based on a Prakrit text read out by Buddhayaśas and translated by Zhu Fonian into Chinese in the Later Qin dynasty, dated to 413 CE. This recension consists of 30 sūtras in contrast to the 34 suttas of the Dīgha Nikāya of the Pāli Canon. It also differs from the latter in adopting a four-part division rather than one into three parts.

Of the 30 discourses in this Chinese Dīrgha Āgama collection, 3 do not have a parallel in the Dīgha Nikāya: DĀ 11, DĀ 12, and DĀ 30. The first two of these, DĀ 11 (增一經) and DĀ 12 (三聚經), are similar in type to the two preceding discourses, DĀ 9 and DĀ 10, which are parallels to the Saṅgīti Sutta and Dasuttara Sutta of the Dīgha Nikāya. All of these discourses list items arranged according to a numerical grid. However, DĀ 11 and DĀ 12 are significantly shorter, in fact too short to warrant their inclusion in a collection of long discourses. For this reason, according to Bhikkhu Anālayo these two discourses may have come into being as extracts from the preceding two discourses. In other words, DĀ 11 and DĀ 12 would have emerged within the context of an already existing Dīrgha Āgama collection.

The situation of DĀ 30 (世記經) is substantially different. This is an exceedingly long discourses, covering 5 fascicles out of the altogether 22 fascicles of the entire Chinese Dīrgha Āgama collection. It contents are also rather unusual, as it covers in detail matters of cosmology. Its existence is responsible for the Chinese Dīrgha Āgama collection having 4 divisions rather than the 3 of the Dīgha Nikāya. Bhikkhu Anālayo considers this discourse to be a later addition to the collection based on the incorporation of extraneous material.

The Chinese Dīrgha Āgama collection has been translated into English by Ichimura Shohei, although unfortunately his translation appears to be unreliable.

== The Sanskrit Dīrgha Āgama ==
In the 1990s, extensive fragments of a Mūlasarvāstivāda Sanskrit recension of the Dīrgha Āgama were discovered. This collection falls into 3 divisions, which together contain 47 discourses. The significantly higher number of discourses compared to the Pali Dīgha Nikāya and the Chinese Dīrgha Āgama reflects a substantially different arrangement of discourses over the four Āgamas. This is evident from the circumstance that a number of discourses from the Sanskrit Dīrgha Āgama have their parallels instead in the Majjhima Nikāya of the Pāli tradition. The first division of this collection, the Ṣaṭsūtrakanipāta, has at times been handed down independently of the whole Dīrgha Āgama collection.

== Individual Dīrgha Āgama Discourses ==
In addition to these three collections of long discourses, several individual Dīrgha Āgama discourses are extant. Recent Gāndhārī manuscript findings testify to versions of the Sāmaññaphala Sutta (DN 2) and the Mahāparinibbāna Sutta (DN 16). The Āgama section of the Taishō Tripiṭaka contains several individual Dīrgha Āgama discourses extant as T 2 to T 25. Out of these, T 13 and T 14 are by An Shigao (安世高), thereby harking back to the very beginnings of Buddhist translation activities in China.

A substantial range of publications offer editions of Sanskrit manuscripts of individual Dīrgha Āgama discourses. Relevant book publications cover versions of the Mahāpadāna Sutta (DN 14), the Mahāparinibbāna Sutta (DN 16), the Mahāsudassana Sutta (DN 17), the Sampasādanīya Sutta (DN 28), the Pāsādika Sutta (DN 29), the Āṭānāṭiya Sutta (DN 32), the Saṅgīti Sutta (DN 33), and the Dasuttara Sutta (DN 34).

Portions of a Mūlasarvāstivāda recension of the Dīrgha Āgama also survive in Tibetan translation. An example is Weller's edition of the Tibetan (and Mongolian) version of the Brahmajāla Sutta (DN 1). Another example is a parallel to the Mahāsamaya Sutta (DN 20) that forms part of the Mahāsūtra collection extant in Tibetan and edited by Skilling. The same Mahāsūtra collection also has a version of the Āṭānāṭiya Sutta (DN 32). Proceeding beyond the scope of Buddhist parallels, a version of the Pāyāsi Sutta (DN 23) exists in Jain literature.

== Bibliography ==
- Bhikkhu Anālayo (2017). Dīrgha-āgama Studies, Taipei: Dharma Drum Publishing Corporation
- Bhikkhunī Dhammadinnā (2014). Research on the Dīrgha-āgama, Taipei: Dharma Drum Publishing Corporation.

== Translations ==
- The Canonical Book of the Buddha's Lengthy Discourses, Vol. I (BDK America)
- The Long Discourses (Dharma Pearls)
