= Āgama (Buddhism) =

Collection of Early Buddhist Texts, related to Pali Canon

In Buddhism, an āgama (आगम Sanskrit and Pāli, Tibetan: ལུང་ (Wylie: lung) for "sacred work" or "scripture") is a collection of early Buddhist texts.

The four āgamas together comprise the Suttapiṭaka of the early Buddhist schools, which had different recensions of each āgama. In the Pali Canon of the Theravāda, the term nikāya is instead used for these collections, counted as five.

== Meaning ==
In Buddhism, the term āgama is used to refer to a collection of discourses (Sanskrit: sūtra; Pali: sutta). In its usage in Pāli discourses, the term āgama occurs in the singular as a referent to the entire body of discourses. This reflects the time before the discourses in circulation were divided into four collections, which reportedly happened at the first saṅgīti or communal recitation, at times somewhat less fittingly referred to as the first Buddhist council.

The Pāli Vinaya account of the first saṅgīti or communal recitation speaks instead of the five nikāyas, whereas parallel versions of the same first saṅgīti in other Vinayas continue to speak of āgamas, still counted as four. Notably, the usage of the term āgama for individual collections continues in Pāli commentaries, which speak of the dīghāgama or aṅguttarāgama for example, alongside the use of nikāya.The term āgama is thus a synonym for the meaning of nikāya. The equivalence in meaning can be seen when the commentary on the Saṃyutta Nikāya describes its content by listing its five chapters but refers to the collection comprising these five chapters as Saṃyuttāgama. This confirms that the term āgama here functions as an equivalent to nikāya. Skilling explains that "Pāli tradition also recognized and used the synonym āgama. Thus, when we refer to the collections as a whole, regardless of their school affiliation, we can refer to them as Āgamas on the understanding that this includes the Nikāyas."

Counterparts to the first four Nikāyas (and parts of the fifth) of the Sutta-Pitaka of the Pali Canon in the form of the four Āgamas are preserved primarily in Chinese translation, with substantial material also surviving in Prakrit/Sanskrit and lesser but still significant amounts surviving in Gāndhārī and in Tibetan translation. The content of both collections, the āgama and the nikāya, are dissimilar to an extent, and several sutras/suttas are dissimilar in content.

In the 4th century Mahāyāna abhidharma work Abhidharmasamuccaya, Āsaṅga refers to the collection which contains the Prakrit/Sanskrit āgamas as the Śrāvakapiṭaka, and associates it with the śrāvakas and pratyekabuddhas. Āsaṅga classifies the Mahāyāna sūtras as belonging to the Bodhisattvapiṭaka, which is designated as the collection of teachings for bodhisattvas.

== History ==
Jens-Uwe Hartmann writes,

According to tradition, the Buddha's discourses were already collected by the time of the first council, held shortly after the Buddha's death ... Scholars, however, see the texts as continually growing in number and size from an unknown nucleus, thereby undergoing various changes in language and content ...

It is clear that, among the early schools, at a minimum the Sarvāstivāda, Kāśyapīya, Mahāsāṃghika, and Dharmaguptaka had recensions of four of the five Prakrit/Sanskrit āgamas that differed. The Āgamas have been compared to the Pali Canon's Nikāyas by contemporary scholars in an attempt to identify possible changes and root phrasings. The Āgamas' existence and similarity to the Sutta Pitaka are sometimes used by scholars to assess to what degree these teachings are a historically authentic representation of the Canon of Early Buddhism. Sometimes also the differences between them are used to suggest an alternative meaning to the accepted meaning of a sutta in either of the two recensions.

== The various āgamas ==
There are four extant collections of Āgamas, and one for which we have only references and fragments (the Kṣudrakāgama). The four extant collections are preserved in their entirety only in Chinese translation (āgama: 阿含經), which are found in the Āgama section of the Taishō Tripiṭaka, as well as in an edition published by Fo Guang Shan.Portions of all four Āgamas are extant in Gāndhārī and Sanskrit manuscripts or else preserved in Tibetan translation. The division into four is based predominantly on textual length: One collection of long discourses, one that has middle-length discourses, and two comprising short discourses. The latter two are further distinguished according to assembling such short discourses based on a shared topic or else based on a shared number ranging from one to eleven. The resultant Āgamas are:

=== Dīrgha Āgama ===
The Dīrgha Āgama ("Long Discourses," Cháng Ahánjīng 長阿含經 Taishō 1) is a discourse collection that in terms of its organization principle parallels the Dīgha Nikāya of the Theravāda school and that has a substantial number of discourses in common with it. A complete version of the Dīrgha Āgama of the Dharmaguptaka (法藏部) school was read out by Buddhayaśas (佛陀耶舍) and translated into Chinese by Zhu Fonian (竺佛念) in the Later Qin dynasty, dated to 413 CE. It contains 30 sūtras in contrast to the 34 suttas of the Theravadin Dīgha Nikāya. A "very substantial" portion of the Mūlasarvāstivādin Dīrgha Āgama survives in Sanskrit, and portions survive in Tibetan translation.

=== Madhyama Āgama ===
The Madhyama Āgama (traditional Chinese: 中阿含經 "Middle-length Discourses") is a discourse collection that in terms of its organization principle parallels the Majjhima Nikāya of the Theravāda school and that has a substantial number of discourses in common with it. A complete translation of the Madhyama Āgama of the Sarvāstivāda school was done by Saṃghadeva (Chinese: 僧伽提婆) in the Eastern Jin dynasty in 397-398 CE. The Madhyama Āgama of the Sarvāstivāda school contains 222 sūtras, in contrast to the 152 suttas of the Pāli Majjhima Nikāya. Individual Madhyama Āgama discourses are also extant in Gāndhārī, Sanskrit, and Tibetan translation.

=== Saṃyukta Āgama ===
The Saṃyukta Āgama ("Connected Discourses", Zá Ahánjīng 雜阿含經) is a discourse collection that in terms of its organization principle parallels the Saṃyutta Nikāya of the Theravāda school and that has a substantial number of discourses in common with it. A Chinese translation of the complete Saṃyukta Āgama of the Mūlasarvāstivāda school was translated by Baoyun (寶雲) based on a Sanskrit original that had been brought by Faxian to China and was read out for the purpose of translation by Guṇabhadra in 435 CE. In addition to this nearly complete Saṃyukta Āgama translation now extant as T 99, there is also an incomplete Chinese translation of the Saṃyukta Āgama (別譯雜阿含經 Taishō 100) of uncertain school affiliation undertaken by an unknown translator. Saṃyukta Āgama discourses are also extant in Gāndhārī, Sanskrit, and Tibetan translation.

=== Ekottarika Āgama ===
The Ekottarika Āgama ("Numbered Discourses," zēngyī āhánjīng, 增壹阿含經 Taishō 125) is a discourse collection that in terms of its organization principle parallels the Anguttara Nikāya of the Theravāda school and that has a number of discourses in common with it. A complete version of the Ekottarika Āgama was translated by Zhu Fonian (竺佛念) in 384 CE based on an original recited from memory by Dharmanandi (曇摩難提). Different school affiliations have been proposed for the collection, with some believing that it came from the Dharmaguptaka or Sarvāstivāda school, but more often the Mahāsāṃghika branch has been proposed. Radich and Norrish conducted a detailed examination of the Ekottarika Āgama combining a comprehensive survey of prior research and proposals of school affiliation with significant novel findings that led to the conclusion that portions of the received text reflect interpolations, mostly of a Mahāyāna type, which would have been introduced during a process of revision presumably undertaken by Zhu Fonian.

Of the four Āgamas of the Sūtra Piṭaka in the Chinese Buddhist Canon, the Ekottarika Āgama is the one which differs most not only from the Theravādin version but also from whatever parallels to its discourses preserved by other reciter traditions. According to Keown, "there is considerable disparity between the Pāli and the [Chinese] versions, with more than two-thirds of the sūtras found in one but not the other compilation." This appears to be due to the presence of Mahāyāna interpolations, and a combination of originally separate discourses that appear to have been part of the revision undertaken in China subsequent to the original translation of the Ekottarika Āgama.

=== Kṣudraka Āgama or Kṣudraka Piṭaka ===
The Kṣudraka Āgama ("Minor Collection") corresponds to the Khuddaka Nikāya, and existed in some schools. The Dharmaguptaka in particular had a Kṣudraka Āgama. The Chinese translation of the Dharmaguptaka Vinaya provides a table of contents for the Dharmaguptaka recension of the Kṣudraka Āgama, and fragments in Gandhari appear to have been found. Items from this Āgama also survive in Tibetan and Chinese translation—fourteen texts, in the latter case. Some schools, notably the Sarvāstivāda, recognized only four Āgamas—they had a "Kṣudraka" which they did not consider to be an "Āgama." Others—including even the Dharmaguptaka, according to some contemporary scholars—preferred to term it a "Kṣudraka Piṭaka." As with its Pāḷi counterpart, the Kṣudraka Āgama appears to have been a miscellany, and was perhaps never definitively established among many early schools.

=== Additional materials ===
In addition, there is a substantial quantity of āgama-style texts outside of the main collections. These are found in various sources:

1. Partial Āgama collections and independent sutras within the Chinese canon.
2. Small groups of sūtras or independent sūtras within the Tibetan canon.
3. Sutras reconstructed from ancient manuscripts in Sanskrit, Gandhari, or other ancient Indic languages.
4. Passages and quotes from Āgama sutras preserved within Mahāyāna sūtras, Abhidharma texts, later commentaries, and so on.
5. Isolated phrases preserved in inscriptions. For example, the Ashoka pillar at Lumbini declares iha budhe jāte, a quote from the Mahāparinirvāna Sūtra (DN 16).

== See also ==
- Early Buddhist Texts
- Early Buddhist schools
- Pāli Canon
- Sutta Piṭaka
- Anguttara Nikāya
- Majjhima Nikāya
- Samyutta Nikaya
- Digha Nikaya
- Khuddaka Nikāya
- Nikaya

== Sources ==
- Analayo, Bhikkhu (2012), Madhyama-āgama Studies (PDF), Dharma Drum Publishing
- Analayo, Bhikkhu (2013), "Mahāyāna in the Ekottarika-āgama" (PDF), Singaporean Journal of Buddhist Studies 1: 5–43, archived from the original (PDF) on 2014-03-11
- Ānandajoti Bhikkhu (2004). The Uraga Sutta. Retrieved 13 Dec 2008 from "Ancient Buddhist Texts" at http://www.ancient-buddhist-texts.net/Buddhist-Texts/C4-Uraga-Verses/index.htm.
- Bingenheimer, Marcus; Bucknell, Rodney S.; Analayo, Bhikkhu (2013), The Madhyama Agama: Middle-length Discourses: 1 (PDF), Bukkyo Dendo Kyokai, ISBN 978-1886439474
- Brough, John (2001). The Gāndhārī Dharmapada. Delhi: Motilal Banarsidass Publishers Private Limited.
- Enomoto, Fumio (1986). On the Formation of the Original Texts of the Chinese Agamas, Buddhist Study Reviews 3 (1), 19-30
- Monier-Williams, Monier (1899, 1964). A Sanskrit-English Dictionary. London: Oxford University Press. ISBN 0-19-864308-X. Retrieved 12 Dec 2008 from "Cologne University" at http://www.sanskrit-lexicon.uni-koeln.de/scans/MWScan/index.php?sfx=pdf Ichimura, Shohei, trans. (2016–2017). The Canonical Book of the Buddha's Lengthy Discourses, Vol. I, Vol. II, Bukkyo Dendo Kyokai Amerika
- Norman, K.R. (1983). Pali Literature: Including the Canonical Literature in Prakrit and Sanskrit of All the Hinayana Schools of Buddhism. Wiesbaden: Otto Harrassowitz.
- Rhys Davids, T.W. & William Stede (eds.) (1921-5). The Pali Text Society’s Pali–English Dictionary. Chipstead: Pali Text Society. Retrieved 12 Dec 2008 from "U. Chicago" at http://dsal.uchicago.edu/dictionaries/pali/.
- Sujato, Bhikkhu; Brahmali, Bhikkhu (2014), The Authenticity of the Early Buddhist Texts (PDF), Buddhist Publication Society, ISBN 978-955-24-0410-8
- Tripāṭhī, Chandra. (Ed.) (1962). 'Fünfundzwanzig Sūtras Des Nidānasaṃyukta' in Sanskrittexte aus den Turfanfunden (Vol. VIII). Edited by Ernst Waldschmidt. Berlin: Akademie-Verlag, 1962. [Includes translation into German]
