= Daniel Ingram =

Daniel Ingram may refer to:

- Daniel Ingram (author) an American author and researcher on Buddhism and meditation
- Daniel Ingram (composer) (born 1975), Canadian composer and songwriter
- Dan Ingram (Daniel Trombley "Dan" Ingram) (1934–2018), American radio disc jockey

== See also ==
- Ingram (surname)
