= Saṃyukta Āgama =

Major scripture of early Buddhism

The Saṃyukta Āgama is one of the four Buddhist Āgamas of the Sūtra Piṭaka. It collects discourses according to topic and corresponds to the Saṃyutta Nikāya of the Pāli Canon. A nearly complete Mūlasarvāstivāda version of the Saṃyukta Āgama is found in the Āgama section of the Taishō Tripiṭaka as entry number 99, titled 雜阿含經 (pinyin: zá āhánjīng), which was translated by Baoyun (寶雲) based on a Sanskrit original read out by Guṇabhadra in 435 CE.

== Origins and history ==
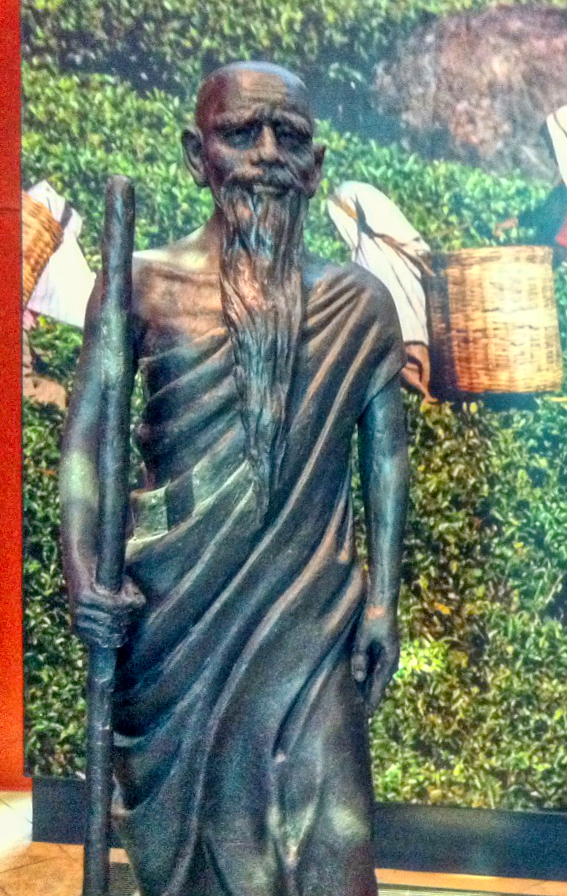
Statue of Faxian

The Saṃyukta Āgama translation now extant as T 99 stands in a close relationship to the travels of the Chinese pilgrim Faxian (法顯), who at the end of the fourth century CE had gone to India in search of Vinaya manuscripts to be brought back to his homeland and translated into Chinese. Baoyun was one of his travel companion for the first part of the journey until they had reached Central Asia, from where Faxian continued on his own to India and eventually to Sri Lanka. During his stay at the Abhayagiri Monastery in Sri Lanka, which at that time had lively contacts with various Buddhist traditions in the Indian mainland, Faxian appears to have acquired the Sanskrit original of the Saṃyukta Āgama. After his return to China and demise, Baoyun appears to have invited the recently arrived Guṇabhadra to recite (and explain) the Sanskrit original so that it could be translated into Chinese. The attribution of the translation to Guṇabhadra, who at that time would not yet have acquired the Chinese language skills necessary to undertake an actual rendering of the text, is in line with a general tendency to accord pride of place to an Indian master as a token of authenticity of the text translated, rather than giving due recognition to the Chinese translator, in this case to Baoyun.

== Structure of the collection ==
The order of discourses in the Saṃyukta Āgama extant as T 99 has at some point in its written transmission fallen into disarray. The proper order has been restored by Anesaki, who notes that the apparent reshuffling of fascicles has led to a loss of some text, as two fascicles of the Saṃyukta Āgama translation were replaced by unrelated texts accidentally taken from a Chinese translation of an Aśokāvadāna. The implication is that what in the Taishō Tripiṭaka now appear as discourses SĀ 604 and SĀ 640 to SĀ 641 are extraneous material rather than being actual Saṃyukta Āgama discourses. The reconstructed order of the remainder of the collection, given in the fascicle numbering of the Taishō edition, is as follows: 1, 10, 3, 2, 5-9, 43, 11, 13, 12, 14-21, 31, 24, 26-30, 41, 32-35, 47, 37-40, 46, 42, 4, 44-45, 36, 22, 48-50.

The reconstructed order of the collection has been adopted in a critical edition provided by Yinshun, by Fo Guang Shan, and a recent edition by Wang Jianwei and Jin Hui. The structure and content of the Saṃyukta Āgama has been studied by Choong, who has also published a series of articles comparing individual saṃyuktas with their Pali parallels.

== Three-aṅga theory ==
The three-aṅga theory proposed by Yinshun considers the Saṃyukta Āgama to be reflecting an early system of textual organization prior to the division into four Āgamas, by way of a three-partite division according to the first three out of the standard listing of nine or twelve aṅgas. The main evidence in support of applying the proposed three-partite division to the reconstructed order of the Saṃyukta Āgama extant as T 99 are a reference in the Vastusaṃgrahaṇī of the Yogācārabhūmi to the structure of the Saṃyukta Āgama as reflecting an allocation of discourses according to speaker, topic, and audience (一是能說, 二是所說, 三是所為說) and a reference in the Mahāsuññata-sutta (and its Chinese parallel), MN 122, to just the first three aṅgas: sutta geyya veyyākaraṇa.

Several problems with this theory have been identified by other scholars. A minor problem is the divergence between the supposed function of the three aṅgas and the traditional understanding of their implications. A more central problem is that there is no evidence in support of the assumption that the transition from a single āgama as a reference to the texts gradually accumulating during the time the Buddha was still alive to a division into four such āgamas reportedly undertaken soon after his demise ever involved an intermediate stage in which the aṅgas, whatever their count, serves as a means for assembling different discourses. Another significant problem is that the listing of three aṅgas occurs in a context in the Mahāsuññata-sutta that could not have intended a reference to a division of the body of texts as known at that time, as on such a reading the passage becomes self-contradictory. Yet another problem is that the three categories mentioned in the Vastusaṃgrahaṇī of the Yogācārabhūmi are complementary, as every discourses has a speaker, takes up some topic, and is addressed to some audience. It follows that these three categories cannot meaningfully be used to divide a body of discourses into three distinct sections.

== Other Saṃyukta Āgama collections and individual discourses ==
A partially translated Saṃyukta Āgama collection is extant as T 100, the Shorter Chinese Saṃyukta Āgama (more literally "another Saṃyukta Āgama translation," 別譯雜阿含) rendered into Chinese by an unknown translator. Bingenheimer, who has specialized on this collection, rejects the widespread attribution of T 100 to the Kāśyapīya school. An anthology of Saṃyukta Āgama discourses translated by An Shigao (安世高) is extant as T 101, which has been studied by Harrison. The Āgama section of the Taishō Tripiṭaka also contains translations of individual Saṃyukta Āgama discourses as T 102 to T 124. Recent Gāndhārī manuscript findings inlude several parallels to Saṃyukta Āgama discourses. Chung offers a detailed survey of Sanskrit manuscript parallels to Saṃyukta Āgama discourses. In collaboration with Fukita, Chung has also provided a new edition of the Nidānasaṃyukta, replacing the earlier and less reliable edition by Tripāṭhī.

The Abhidharmakośabhāṣya contains a range of discourse quotations. Śamathadeva has compiled a commentary or anthology of these discourse quotations, providing a substantial portion or even the whole discourse in question. The result of his efforts, the Abhidharmakośopāyikā or Abhidharmakośopāyikāṭīkā, has been preserved in Tibetan translation. Although the quotations given by Vasubandhu in the Abhidharmakośabhāṣya draw on all four Āgamas, due to its doctrinal orientation Saṃyukta Āgama discourses make up the majority of the texts covered in Śamathadeva's work, making his Abhidharmakośopāyikā(ṭīkā) an important source of information on a Mūlasarvāstivāda version of the Saṃyukta Āgama.

== Bibliography ==
- Analayo, Bhikkhu (2015), Saṃyukta-āgama Studies (PDF), Taipei: Dharma Drum Publishing Corporation
- Bhikkhunī Dhammadinnā (ed.). (2020). Research on the Saṃyukta Āgama. Taipei: Dharma Drum Publishing Corporation.
- Choong, Mun-keat (2000).The Fundamental Teachings of Early Buddhism, A comparative study based on the Sūtrāṅga portion of the Pāli Saṃyutta-Nikāya and the Chinese Saṃyuktāgama. Wiesbaden: Otto Harrassowitz

== See also ==
- Āgama (Buddhism)
- Shorter Chinese Saṃyukta Āgama
- Saṃyutta Nikaya
