= Ksudraka Agama =

The Ksudraka Agama (Skt. Kṣudraka Āgama; English: "Minor Collection") is one of the Buddhist Agamas, a collection of Buddhist texts. It corresponds to the Khuddaka Nikaya of the Pali Canon.

Rupert Gethin writes that in addition to the four main Nikāya/Āgama texts, a ‘minor’ collection of miscellaneous texts was also recognized. This fifth collection included works such as the Dharmapada and the Jātakas (tales of the previous lives of the Buddha). These four Nikāyas—together with a varying number of lesser texts constituting the Ksudraka Agama—comprised the Sūtra/Sutta Piṭaka (‘the basket of discourses’) of the earliest Buddhist schools.

The Dharmaguptaka in particular recognized a Kṣudraka Āgama. The Chinese translation of the Dharmaguptaka Vinaya provides a table of contents for the Dharmaguptaka recension of the Kṣudraka Āgama, and fragments in Gandhari appear to have been found. Items from this Āgama also survive in Tibetan and Chinese translation—fourteen texts, in the latter case.

Some schools, notably the Sarvāstivāda, recognized only four Āgamas—though they had a "Kṣudraka" which they did not consider to be an "Āgama." Others—including even the Dharmaguptaka, according to some contemporary scholars—preferred to term it the "Kṣudraka Piṭaka." As with its Pāḷi counterpart, the Kṣudraka Āgama appears to have been a miscellany, and was perhaps never definitively established among many of the early schools of Buddhism.
