= Sutra Pitaka =

The phrase Sutra Pitaka (from the Sanskrit meaning "basket of teachings" or "collection of aphorisms") can refer to:

- the section of the Theravada Buddhist Pali Canon called the "Sutta Pitaka" in Pāli
- the Agamas of various extinct schools of Buddhism
- the Mahayana sutras, a broad genre of Buddhist scriptures that various traditions of Mahāyāna Buddhism accept as canonical

== See also ==
- Buddhist texts
