= Zhu Fonian =

4th to 5th century Buddhist monk and translator

Zhu Fonian (Chinese: 竺佛念, pinyin: Zhú Fóniàn) was a Buddhist monk and prolific translator of Buddhist texts into Chinese who lived in the fourth to early fifth century. Legittimo renders his name as "Indian Buddhasmṛti", but Bhikkhu Anālayo points out that this form seems to be unattested and the preferable term would be Buddhānusmṛti.

== Life ==
Based on the information given by Sengyou (僧祐) in the Chu sanzang ji ji (出三藏記集), Nattier explains that Zhu Fonian was born in Liangzhou (涼州) and became a monk at a young age, being conversant in Chinese and non-Chinese languages. When foreign monks arrived at Chang’an (長安) with untranslated Indic texts, Zhu Fonian was invited to collaborate with them in an effort at rendering these texts into Chinese. Nattier distinguishes between two distinct phases in Zhu Fonian's translation activities: An early period during which he translated non-Mahāyāna texts in collaboration with foreign monks and a later period during which he produced Mahāyāna texts and a version of the Dharmapada to all appearances working on his own.

== Activities ==
Since Zhu Fonian was involved in a significant number of translations, including some rather important works, the question of the reliability of his translations has received a significant amount of attention by Buddhist scholars. Nattier examines in detail T 309 (最勝問菩薩十住除垢斷結經), coming to the conclusion that this work should be characterized as a composition by Zhu Fonian rather than a translation of an Indic original. She concludes that Zhu Fonian "now appears not only as a translator but as a master composer of new Buddhist texts," followed by recommending that other Mahāyāna texts produced by him as well as his translation of the Ekottarika Āgama (T 125, 增壹阿含經) should be examined in the light of her findings. Palumbo accepts her findings for T 309 but objects against an extension of her assessment to other texts stemming from the hand of Zhu Fonian, which he considers to amount to "a character assassination of sorts."

Lin and Radich followed up Nattier's suggestion, with the result of finding that T 656 (菩薩瓔珞經) shows similar traces of compositional activity by Zhu Fonian rather than being a translation, and that the same appears to apply to T 384 (菩薩從兜術天降神母胎說廣普經) and T 385 (中陰經). The situation of the Ekottarika Āgama is complicated by some uncertainty regarding its attribution to Zhu Fonian. For this reason, Radich first established that its Chinese translation, T 125, should indeed be attributed to Zhu Fonian. Building on that foundation, Radich and Norrish conducted a detailed examination of the Ekottarika Āgama combining a comprehensive survey of prior research with significant novel findings that led to the conclusion that portions of the received text reflect interpolations, mostly of a Mahāyāna type.

The assessment that emerges from the above research does not apply to Zhu Fonian's translation of the Dharmagutaka Vinaya, T 1428 (四分律), undertaken in collaboration with Buddhayaśas, which served and still serves as the foundational texts for East Asian Buddhist monasticism. Although the Ekottarika Āgama was similarly translated by Zhu Fonian in collaboration with others, there is clear evidence that the version now extant as T 125 (增壹阿含經) is not the original translation but much rather a later revision that resulted in a significant increase of the volume of the text.
