= Madhyama Agama =

Early Indian Buddhist text

The Madhyama Āgama (Chinese: 中阿含經; pinyin: zhōng āhán jīng) is an early Indian Buddhist text, of which currently only a Chinese translation is extant (Taishō Tripiṭaka 26). The title means "Middle Collection" and reflects the circumstance that the criterion for inclusion is the approximately medium length of its discourses. It is one of the four Āgamas of the Sūtra Piṭaka located in the Chinese Buddhist Canon and contains 222 discourses in 18 chapters. Its Pali equivalent, the Majjhima Nikāya, contains 152 discourses in 15 chapters.

== Origins and history ==
The extant Chinese translation of the Madhyama Āgama dates to 397–398 C.E. P.V. Bapat believes the original source for the Chinese translation was in a form of Prakrit, closer to Pali than Sanskrit. The text stems from a Sarvāstivāda reciter tradition.

A groundbreaking study of the Madhyama Āgama was undertaken by Thich Minh Chau, comparing this collection with the Majjhima Nikāya, based on his doctoral thesis completed in 1964. Although by now inevitably to some degree outdated, it remains an important reference point for those interested in the Madhyama Āgama. Studying this collection can be of considerable help in providing perspectives on discourses in the Majjhima Nikāya.

== Parallels ==
There are numerous parallels between the discourses in the Madhyama Āgama and discourses in the Pali Sutta Piṭaka.

...of the two hundred and twenty-two sutras of T. 26, only one hundred and three have their counterpart in the Majjhimanikāya; fourteen have their counterpart in the Dīghanikāya, seventeen in the Saṃyuttanikāya, and eighty-seven in the Aṅguttaranikāya. Fourteen of the two hundred and twenty-two sutras of T. 26 have no known parallel in the Pāli corpus.

Particularly noteworthy is the high number of parallels in the Aṅguttara Nikāya, which reflects a substantially different distribution of discourses over the four Āgamas or Nikāyas.

In addition, recent Gāndhārī manuscript findings inlude several parallels to Madhyama Āgama discourses. Chung and Fukita in turn provide a detailed survey of Sanskrit manuscript parallels. Individual Madhyama Āgama discourses are also extant in Chinese translation in the Āgama section of the Taishō Tripiṭaka as T 27 to T 98. Out of these, T 31, T 32, T 36, T 48, and T 57 are by An Shigao (安世高), thereby being part of the beginnings of Buddhist translation activities in China. Portions of a Mūlasarvāstivāda recension of the Madhyama Āgama also survive in Tibetan translation. An example is a Tibetan version of the Cūḷavedalla Sutta (MN 44). A version of the same discourse is also extant in the Chinese Madhyama Āgama, comparison with which shows distinct differences between the Mūlasarvāstivāda version extant in Tibetan and its Sarvāstivāda counterpart preserved in Chinese. In addition, several Mūlasarvāstivāda parallels form part of the Mahāsūtra collection extant in Tibetan and edited by Skilling: A version of the Pañcattaya Sutta (MN 102), a version of the Cūḷasuññata Sutta (MN 121), and a version of the Mahāsuññata Sutta (MN 122).

== English translations ==
Translation of the Madhyama Āgama into English began in 2006 with Marcus Bingenheimer as chief editor and Bhikkhu Analayo and Rodney S. Bucknell as co-editors. The first of four volumes was published in 2013. For the remaining three volumes, Bhikkhu Analayo and Rodney S. Bucknell continued as editors, with the second volume published in 2020, the third in 2022, and the fourth in 2023.

== Bibliography ==
- Analayo, Bhikkhu (2012), Madhyama-āgama Studies (PDF), Dharma Drum Publishing
- Bingenheimer, Marcus; Bucknell, Rodney S.; Analayo, Bhikkhu (2013), The Madhyama Agama: Middle-length Discourses: 1 (PDF), Bukkyo Dendo Kyokai, ISBN 978-1886439474, archived from the original (PDF) on 2018-04-13
- Bhikkhunī Dhammadinnā (ed.), 2017 Research on the Madhyama-āgama, Taipei: Dharma Drum Publishing Corporation.
