= Ekottara Agama =

Early Indian Buddhist text

The Ekottara Āgama or probably more correctly the Ekottarika Āgama (Sanskrit; traditional Chinese: 增壹阿含經; ; pinyin: zēngyī āhánjīng) is an early Indian Buddhist text, that currently is completely extant only in a Chinese translation (Taishō Tripiṭaka 125). The title Ekottarika Āgama refers to its organizational principle by way of increasing numbers. It is one of the four Āgamas of the Sūtra Piṭaka located in the Chinese Buddhist Canon.

== Origins and history ==
According to Tse Fu Kuan, "in 385 AD Zhu Fonian (竺佛念) completed a Chinese translation of the Ekottarika Āgama recited by Dharmanandin (曇摩難提), a monk from Tukhāra. This first translation, in forty-one fascicles, was later revised and expanded by Zhu Fonian into the Ekottarika Āgama in fifty-one fascicles that has since come down to us. Zhu Fonian probably added new material to his first translation and even replaced some passages of his first translation with new material." The complex process of revision and textual expansion occurring subsequent to the original translation has been studied in detail by Palumbo.

Scholars such as Yin Shun, Zhihua Yao and Tse Fu Kuan consider the Ekottarika Āgama to belong to the Mahāsāṃghika school. According to Étienne Lamotte, the original of the Ekottarika Āgama came from northwest India or Serindia, and it contains a great deal of Mahāyāna influence. The presence of Mahāyāna interpolations has been confirmed by Kuan and Bhikkhu Anālayo. According to Sheng Yen, the Ekottarika Āgama includes teachings of the Six Pāramitās, a central concept in the bodhisattva path in general and in Mahāyāna teachings.

== Distinct Nature of T 125 ==
The Ekottarika Āgama generally corresponds to the Theravādin Aṅguttara Nikāya, but of the four Āgamas of the Sūtra Piṭaka in the Chinese Buddhist Canon, it is the one which differs most from the Pali version. According to Keown, "there is considerable disparity between the Pāli and the [Chinese] versions, with more than two-thirds of the sūtras found in one but not the other compilation."

Anālayo documents a phenomenon to which he refers to as "discourse merger," in the sense that discourses that in other reciter traditions of the Āgamas reflect separate teaching occasions have been combined into a single discourse in the Ekottarika Āgama in a way that shows fairly clear signs of later combination rather than reflecting originally separate teachings. Su has documented structural irregularities in the received text. In a detailed study of a particular tale found twice in the Ekottarika Āgama, Anālayo has shown that one of these versions was added in China to the collection. His findings have been corroborated by Hung based on quantitative text analysis.

Nattier has shown that another 'translation' by Zhu Fonian, T 309 (最勝問菩薩十住除垢斷結經), should be characterized as a composition rather than a translation of an Indic original. Lin and Radich followed up Nattier's findings by conducting similar research on other 'translations' by Zhu Fonian, with the result of finding that T 656 (菩薩瓔珞經) shows similar traces of compositional activity rather than being a translation, and that the same appears to apply to T 384 (菩薩從兜術天降神母胎說廣普經) and T 385 (中陰經). Building on that foundation, Radich and Norrish conducted a detailed examination of the Ekottarika Āgama combining a comprehensive survey of prior research with significant novel findings that led to the conclusion that portions of the received text reflect interpolations, mostly of a Mahāyāna type, which would have been introduced during a process of revision presumably undertaken by Zhu Fonian. This significantly complicates any attempt at determining the school affiliation of the text now extant as T 125, as this would require finding a way of separating the original Indic text, recited from memory by Dharmanandin, from the material accretions that occurred in China. In short, T 125 has lost whatever school affiliation the Indic text may have had.

== Other Versions of an Ekottarika Āgama ==
Recent Gāndhārī manuscript findings inlude several parallels to Ekottarika Āgama discourses. Sanskrit fragments of an Ekottarika Āgama have been edited by Tripāṭhī. The Āgama section of the Taishō Tripiṭaka contains several individually translated Ekottarika Āgama discourses as T 127 to T 149. T 150A in turn is an Ekottarika Āgama anthology translated by An Shigao (安世高). Harrison has studied this text and ingeniously reconstructed the order of its discourses, which at some point had fallen into disarray.

== Mindfulness ==
The impact of the chequered history of the received Ekottarika Āgama can be illustrated with the example of two central teachings on the topic of mindfulness: the four establishments of mindfulness (satipaṭṭhāna) and mindfulness of breathing. The first of these two topics receives coverage in EĀ 12.1. Alongside some ideosyncracies that appear to reflect the usual vagaries of oral transmission, EĀ 12.1 seems to be a genuine testimony to the Indic original and thereby provides important evidence for a comparative study of the evolution of descriptions on how to cultivate the four establishments of mindfulness.

The situation differs in the case of EĀ 17.1, a discourse that includes meditative instructions on mindfulness of breathing given by the Buddha to his son Rāhula. In it, the Buddha gives Rāhula instructions on how he can practice this form of meditation in a way that differs significantly from the usual scheme of sixteen steps of mindfulness of breathing. Rāhula passes through the four stages of dhyāna and attains liberation. In the Pali parallel, the Mahā-Rāhulovāda Sutta of the Majjhima Nikāya (MN 62), the instructions are instead on the sixteen steps of mindfulness of breathing and this discourse reports no attainment. In evaluating this difference, it is significant that the part in EĀ 17.1 prior to the instructions on mindfulness of breathing shows signs of being implicated in the revision of the collection undertaken after its translation. In his study and translation of the instructions in EĀ 17.1, Bhikkhu Anālayo notes that instructions on the sixteen steps are found in texts reflecting the Dharmaguptaka, Mahāsāṅghika, and Sarvāstivāda reciter traditions, which are the possible school affiliations einvisaged thus far for the Indic original of the Ekottarika Āgama. Taken together, this makes it doubtful that these instructions are a genuine reflection of the Indic original of the Ekottarika Āgama.

== Influence on East Asia ==
In lectures, renowned Buddhist master Nan Huaijin frequently cited the Ekottarika Āgama for its discourse on Mindfulness of Breathing, and lectures on Rāhula's report to the Buddha. He detailed the fine points of practice and the relationships that exist between the mind, body, and breath, including related exoteric and esoteric phenomena. Also discussed were the dissemination of this practice into various forms in the Mahāyāna schools of Buddhism in East Asia such as Zen and Tiantai, and into Daoist meditative practices.

== Translation of the Ekottarika Āgama ==
A serialized translation of parts of the Ekottarika Āgama has been undertaken by Thich Huyen-Vi since 1983, joined at a later time by Bhikkhu Pāsādika and published in Buddhist Studies Review. The first series of such translations, numbered 1 to 14, were published in French from 1983 to 1993. The ensuing installations, numbered 15 to 34, were instead published in English from 1993 to 2004. The translation effort thereby reached up to fascicle 12 of the fifty-one fascicles of the Ekottarika Āgama, covering discourses up to EĀ 21.10, the last discourse translated by Thich Huyen-Vi and Bhikkhu Pāsādika in 2004.

== Bibliography ==
- Anālayo, Bhikkhu (2016), Ekottarika-āgama Studies (PDF), Taipei: Dharma Drum Publishing
- Bhikkhunī Dhammadinnā (ed.), 2013. Research on the Ekottarika Āgama, Taipei: Dharma Drum Publishing Corporation.

== See also ==
- Āgama (Buddhism)
- Anguttara Nikaya
- Anapanasati
