= Daniel Ingram (author) =

American scholar on Buddhism

- Born: 1969 or 1970
- Occupation: Author
- Notable work: Mastering the Core Teachings of the Buddha
- Website: integrateddaniel.info

Daniel M. Ingram is an American author and researcher on Buddhism and meditation. A physician, Ingram worked in emergency medicine before retiring in his late forties. Ingram is the author of the 2008 book Mastering the Core Teachings of the Buddha: An Unusually Hardcore Dharma Book, in which he argues that enlightenment is an attainable goal. He describes himself as an arahat, a step that few Buddhist teachers take, and one that has been met with some criticism within the community.

Ingram describes Mahasi Sayadaw and Bill Hamilton as important influences. With Kenneth Folk, he is associated with the "Pragmatic Dharma" movement. He leads the Emergent Phenomenology Research Consortium, a group that seeks to study spiritual experiences through scientific methodologies. He has co-authored several scientific papers on meditation experiences. Ingram is married and lives in rural Alabama.

== Mastering the Core Teachings of the Buddha ==
Ingram's book Mastering the Core Teachings of the Buddha (MCTB) was first released in 2008. A second version was released in 2018 and is freely available online.

=== Contents ===
The book is divided into six parts. Part I is about the fundamentals of practice, part II is about common pitfalls, part III is about the jhanas, part IV is about insight practice (as opposed to shamatha) part V is about enlightenment, and part VI is about his personal story.

In the book, Ingram describes first beginning meditation practice after attaining an Arising and Passing Away (A&P) experience at a concert, without any meditation. Shortly after this, he went on his first nine-day Insight Meditation Society retreat, at the urging of his friend Kenneth Folk, in August 1994.

=== India ===
In the chapter "Thank U, India", he describes going on his second meditation retreat in Bodh Gaya, Bihar in January 1995. It was a seventeen-day intensive course at a Thai monastery, with other experienced Western meditators such as Christopher Titmuss. This is where he first attained stream entry.

As he was considering going to medical school at the time, the retreat also involved volunteering at a local health clinic for the impoverished. After a month in Bihar, he visited the neighborhood of Kalighat in Kolkata, West Bengal to continue doing public health work. He stayed there for the next 5 months at an outdoor street clinic in the northern slums of Kolkata.

== The Fire Kasina ==
Ingram has also published another book, The Fire Kasina, about his experiences at a meditation retreat focusing on fire kasina, a practice described in the Visuddhimagga and Vimuttimagga.

== Reception ==
Mastering the Core Teachings of the Buddha was reviewed on the blog Slate Star Codex, which described it as "a lucid guide to issues surrounding meditation practice and a good rational introduction to the Buddhist system." Naval Ravikant recommended the book in an appearance on Tim Ferriss's podcast. In 2020 Bhikkhu Anālayo published a negative assessment of Ingram's work in the journal Mindfulness, to which Ingram responded on the podcast Guru Viking. Ingram claims that Bhikkhu Anālayo has been asked by a senior mindfulness teacher to critique and discredit Ingram which Bhikkhu Anālayo denies.

== See also ==
- S. N. Goenka
- Sayadaw U Pandita

== Notes ==
By Ingram's account, he became an arahat on a retreat in April 2003.
