= Dharmaguptaka =

Early Buddhist school

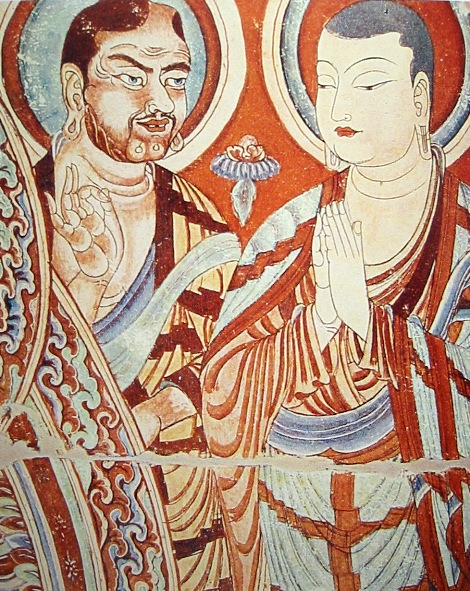
Central Asian Buddhist monk teaching a Chinese monk. Bezeklik Caves, 9th–10th century; although Albert von Le Coq (1913) assumed the blue-eyed, red-haired monk was a Tocharian, modern scholarship has identified similar Caucasoid figures of the same cave temple (No. 9) as ethnic Sogdians, an Eastern Iranian people who inhabited Turfan as an ethnic minority community during the phases of Tang Chinese (7th–8th century) and Uyghur rule (9th–13th century).

The Dharmaguptaka (Sanskrit: धर्मगुप्तक; Chinese: 法藏部; pinyin: Fǎzàng Bù; Vietnamese: Pháp Tạng bộ) is one of the eighteen or twenty early Buddhist schools, depending on the source. They are said to have originated from another sect, the Mahīśāsakas. The Dharmaguptakas had a prominent role in early Central Asian and Chinese Buddhism, and their Prātimokṣa (monastic rules for bhikṣus and bhikṣuṇīs) are still in effect in East Asian countries to this day, including China, Vietnam, Korea, and Japan as well as the Philippines. They are one of three surviving Vinaya lineages, along with that of the Theravāda and the Mūlasarvāstivāda.

== Etymology ==
Guptaka means "preserver" and dharma "law, justice, morality", and, most likely, the set of laws of Northern Buddhism.

== Doctrinal development ==
=== Overview ===
The Dharmaguptakas regarded the path of a śrāvaka (śrāvakayāna) and the path of a bodhisattva (bodhisattvayāna) to be separate. A translation and commentary on the Samayabhedoparacanaćakra reads:

They say that although the Buddha is part of the Saṃgha, the fruits of giving to the Buddha are especially great, but not so for the Saṃgha. Making offerings to stūpas may result in many extensive benefits. The Buddha and those of the Two Vehicles, although they have one and the same liberation, have followed different noble paths. Those of outer paths (i.e. heretics) cannot obtain the five supernormal powers. The body of an arhat is without outflows. In many other ways, their views are similar to those of the Mahāsāṃghikas.

According to the Abhidharma Mahāvibhāṣā Śāstra, the Dharmaguptakas held that the Four Noble Truths are to be observed simultaneously.

Vasubandhu states that the Dharmaguptakas held, in agreement with Theravāda and against Sarvāstivāda, that realisation of the Four Noble Truths happens all at once (ekābhisamaya).

The Dharmaguptaka are known to have rejected the authority of the Sarvāstivāda Prātimokṣa rules on the grounds that the original teachings of the Buddha had been lost.

=== Twelve Aṅgas ===
The Dharmaguptaka used a twelvefold division of the Buddhist teachings, which has been found in their Dīrgha Āgama, their Vinaya, and in some Mahāyāna sūtras. These twelve divisions are: Sūtra, Geya, Vyākaraṇa, Gāthā, Udāna, Nidāna, Jātaka, Itivṛttaka, Vaipulya, Adbhūtadharma, Avadāna, and Upadeśa.

== Appearance and language ==
=== Robes ===
Between 148 and 170 CE, the Parthian monk An Shigao came to China and translated a work which described the color of monastic robes (Skt. kāṣāya) utilised in five major Indian Buddhist sects, called Da Biqiu Sanqian Weiyi (Chinese: 大比丘三千威儀). Another text translated at a later date, the Śāriputraparipṛcchā, contains a very similar passage with nearly the same information. However, the colors for Dharmaguptaka and Sarvāstivāda are reversed. In the earlier source, the Sarvāstivāda are described as wearing deep red robes, while the Dharmaguptaka are described as wearing black robes. The corresponding passage found in the later Śāriputraparipṛcchā, in contrast, portrays the Sarvāstivāda as wearing black robes and the Dharmaguptaka as wearing deep red robes.

During the Tang dynasty, Chinese Buddhist monastics typically wore grayish-black robes and were even colloquially referred to as Zīyī (Chinese: 緇衣), "those of the black robes." However, the Song dynasty monk Zanning (919–1001 CE) writes that during the earlier Han-Wei period, the Chinese monks typically wore red robes.

According to the Dharmaguptaka Vinaya, the robes of monastics should be sewn out of no more than 18 pieces of cloth, and the cloth should be fairly heavy and coarse.

=== Language ===
A consensus has grown in scholarship which sees the first wave of Buddhist missionary work as associated with the Gāndhārī language and the Kharoṣṭhī script and tentatively with the Dharmaguptaka sect. However, there is evidence that other sects and traditions of Buddhism also used Gāndhārī, and further evidence that the Dharmaguptaka sect also used Sanskrit at times:

It is true that most manuscripts in Gāndhārī belong to the Dharmaguptakas, but virtually all schools — inclusive Mahāyāna — used some Gāndhārī. Von Hinüber (1982b and 1983) has pointed out incompletely Sanskritised Gāndhārī words in works heretofore ascribed to the Sarvāstivādins and drew the conclusion that either the sectarian attribution had to be revised, or the tacit dogma "Gāndhārī equals Dharmaguptaka" is wrong. Conversely, Dharmaguptakas also resorted to Sanskrit.

Starting in the first century CE, there was a large trend toward a type of Gāndhārī which was heavily Sanskritised.

== History ==
=== In Gandhāra ===
The Gandharan Buddhist texts, the earliest Buddhist texts ever discovered, are apparently dedicated to the teachers of the Dharmaguptaka school. They tend to confirm a flourishing of the Dharmaguptaka school in Northwest Indian subcontinent around the 1st century CE, with Gāndhārī as the canonical language, and this would explain the subsequent influence of the Dharmaguptakas in Central Asia and then East Asia. According to Buddhist scholar A. K. Warder, the Dharmaguptaka originated in Aparānta.

According to one scholar, the evidence afforded by the Gandharan Buddhist texts "suggest[s] that the Dharmaguptaka sect achieved early success under their Indo-Scythian supporters in Gandhāra, but that the sect subsequently declined with the rise of the Kuṣāṇa Empire (c. mid-first to third century A.D.), which gave its patronage to the Sarvāstivāda sect."

=== In Central Asia ===
Available evidence indicates that the first Buddhist missions to Khotan were carried out by the Dharmaguptaka sect:

[T]he Khotan Dharmapada, some orthographical devices of Khotanese and the not yet systematically plotted Gāndhārī loan words in Khotanese betray indisputably that the first missions in Khotan included Dharmaguptakas and used a Kharoṣṭhī-written Gāndhārī. Now all other manuscripts from Khotan, and especially all manuscripts written in Khotanese, belong to the Mahāyāna, are written in the Brāhmī script, and were translated from Sanskrit.

A number of scholars have identified three distinct major phases of missionary activities seen in the history of Buddhism in Central Asia, which are associated with the following sects, chronologically:

1. Dharmagupta
2. Sarvāstivāda
3. Mūlasarvāstivāda

In the 7th century, Xuanzang and Yijing both recorded that the Dharmaguptakas were located in Oḍḍiyāna and Central Asia, but not in the Indian subcontinent. Yijing grouped the Mahīśāsaka, Dharmaguptaka, and Kāśyapīya together as sub-sects of the Sarvāstivāda, and stated that these three were not prevalent in the "five parts of India," but were located in the some parts of Oḍḍiyāna, Khotan, and Kucha.

=== In East Asia ===
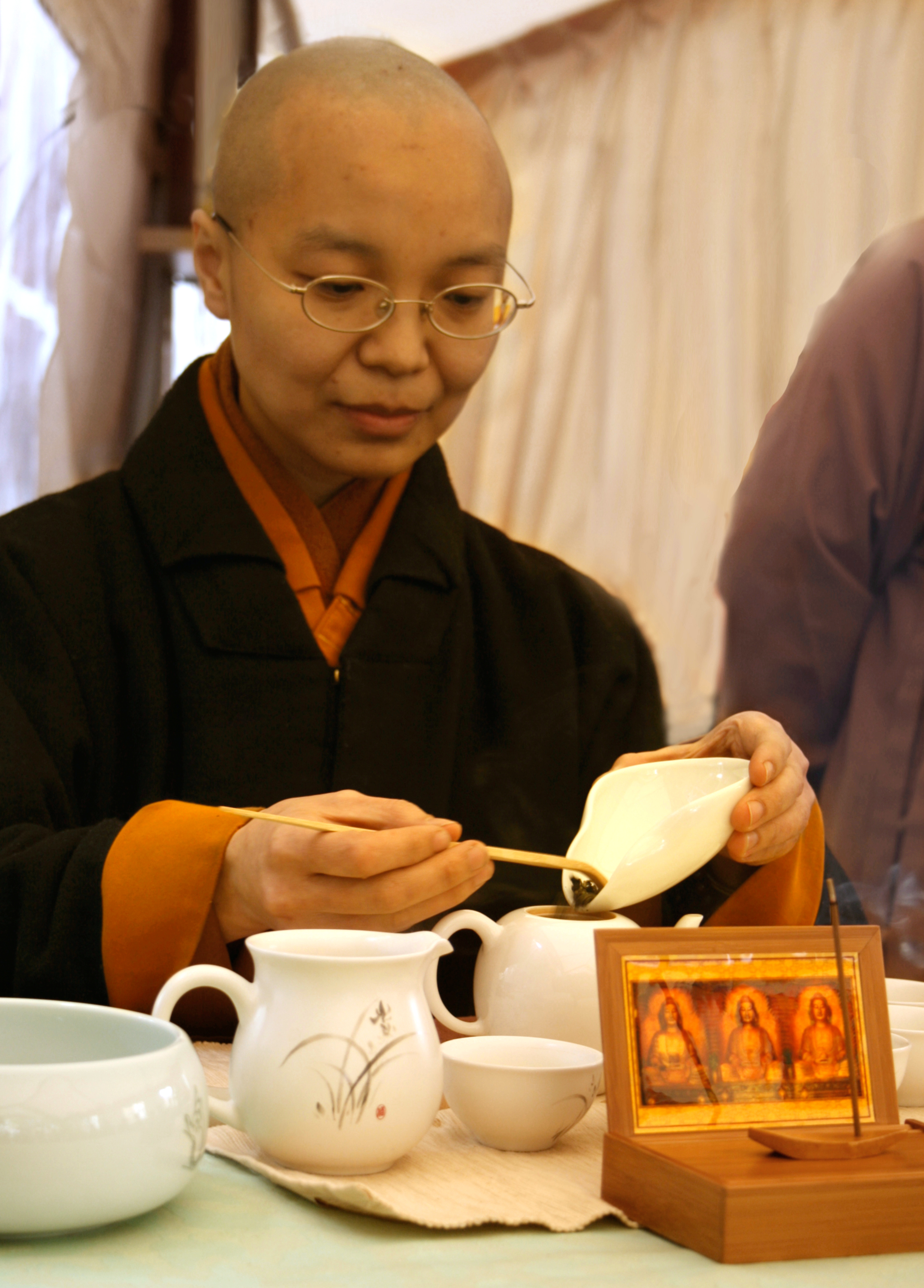
Full bhikṣuṇī ordination is common in the Dharmaguptaka lineage. Vesak festival, Taiwan.

The Dharmaguptakas made more efforts than any other sect to spread Buddhism outside India, to areas such as Iran, Central Asia, and China, and they had great success in doing so. Therefore, most countries which adopted Buddhism from China, also adopted the Dharmaguptaka Vinaya and ordination lineage for bhikṣus and bhikṣuṇīs. According to A. K. Warder, in some ways the Dharmaguptaka sect can be considered to have survived to the present in those East Asian countries. Warder further writes:

It was the Dharmaguptakas who were the first Buddhists to establish themselves in Central Asia. They appear to have carried out a vast circling movement along the trade routes from Aparānta north-west into Iran and at the same time into Oḍḍiyāna (the Suvastu Valley, north of Gandhāra, which became one of their main centres). After establishing themselves as far west as Parthia they followed the "silk route", the east-west axis of Asia, eastwards across Central Asia and on into China, where they effectively established Buddhism in the second and third centuries A.D. The Mahīśāsakas and Kāśyapīyas appear to have followed them across Asia into China. [...] For the earlier period of Chinese Buddhism it was the Dharmaguptakas who constituted the main and most influential school, and even later their Vinaya remained the basis of the discipline there.

During the early period of Chinese Buddhism, the Indian Buddhist sects recognised as important, and whose texts were studied, were the Dharmaguptakas, Mahīśāsakas, Kāśyapīyas, Sarvāstivādins, and the Mahāsāṃghikas.

Between 250 and 255 CE, the Dharmaguptaka ordination lineage was established in China when Indian monks were invited to help with ordination in China. No full Vinaya had been translated at this time, and only two texts were available: the Dharmaguptaka Karmavācanā for ordination, and the Mahāsāṃghika Prātimokṣa for regulating the life of monks. After the translation of full Vinayas, the Dharmaguptaka ordination lineage was followed by most monks, but temples often regulated monastic life with other Vinaya texts, such as those of the Mahāsāṃghika, the Mahīśāsaka, or the Sarvāstivāda.

In the 7th century, Yijing wrote that in eastern China, most people followed the Dharmaguptaka Vinaya, while the Mahāsāṃghika Vinaya was used in earlier times in Guanzhong (the region around Chang'an), and that the Sarvāstivāda Vinaya was prominent in the Yangtze area and further south. In the 7th century, the existence of multiple Vinaya lineages throughout China was criticised by prominent Vinaya masters such as Yijing and Dao An (654–717). In the early 8th century, Dao An gained the support of Emperor Zhongzong of Tang and an imperial edict was issued that the Sangha in China should use only the Dharmaguptaka vinaya for ordination.

== Texts ==
=== Gandhāran Buddhist texts ===
The Gandhāran Buddhist texts (the oldest extant Buddhist manuscripts) are attributed to the Dharmaguptaka sect by Richard Salomon, the leading scholar in the field, and the British Library scrolls "represent a random but reasonably representative fraction of what was probably a much larger set of texts preserved in the library of a monastery of the Dharmaguptaka sect in Nagarāhāra Afghanistan."

Among the Dharmaguptaka Gandhāran Buddhist texts in the Schøyen Collection, is a fragment in the Kharoṣṭhī script referencing the Six Pāramitās, a central practice for bodhisattvas in Mahāyāna doctrine.

=== Vinaya translation ===
In the early 5th century CE, Dharmaguptaka Vinaya was translated into Chinese by Zhu Fonian (竺佛念) based on a text recited by Buddhayaśas (佛陀耶舍) of Kashmir. For this translation, Buddhayaśas recited the Dharmaguptaka Vinaya entirely from memory, rather than reading it from a written manuscript. After its translation, the Dharmaguptaka Vinaya became the predominant vinaya in Chinese Buddhist monasticism. The Dharmaguptaka Vinaya, or monastic rules, are still followed today in China, Vietnam and Korea, and its lineage for the ordination of monks and nuns has survived uninterrupted to this day. The name of the Dharmaguptaka Vinaya in the East Asian tradition is the "Vinaya in Four Parts" (Chinese: 四分律; pinyin: Sìfēn Lǜ), and the equivalent Sanskrit title would be Caturvargika Vinaya. Ordination under the Dharmaguptaka Vinaya only relates to monastic vows and lineage (Vinaya), and does not conflict with the actual Buddhist teachings that one follows (Dharma).

=== Āgama collections ===
The Dīrgha Āgama ("Long Discourses," 長阿含經 Cháng Āhán Jīng) (T. 1) corresponds to the Dīgha Nikāya of the Theravāda school. A complete version of the Dīrgha Āgama of the Dharmaguptaka sect was translated by Zhu Fonian (竺佛念),based on a text read out by Buddhayaśas, in the Later Qin dynasty, dated to 413 CE. It contains 30 sūtras in contrast to the 34 suttas of the Theravādin Dīgha Nikāya.

The Ekottara Āgama ("Incremental Discourses," 增壹阿含經 Zēngyī Āhán Jīng) (T. 125) corresponds to the Aṅguttara Nikāya of the Theravāda school. It was translated into Chinese by Zhu Fonian (竺佛念) based on a text recited from memory by Dharmanandi in 384 CE. Some have proposed that the original text for this translation came from the Dharmaguptaka tradition, although others have proposed a Sarvāstivādins or Mahāsāṃghika origin. Radich and Norrish provide a detailed survey of prior attributions of school affiliation of the Ekottarika Āgama, combined with significant novel findings that led to the conclusion that portions of the received text reflect interpolations. This significantly complicates any attempt at determining the school affiliation of the text now extant as T 125, as this would require finding a way of separating the original Indic text, recited from memory by Dharmanandin, from the material accretions that occurred in China.

=== Abhidharma ===
The Śāriputra Abhidharma Śāstra (舍利弗阿毘曇論 Shèlìfú Āpítán Lùn) (T. 1548) is a complete Abhidharma text that is thought to come from the Dharmaguptaka sect. The only complete edition of this text is in Chinese. Sanskrit fragments have been found in Bamiyan, Afghanistan, and are now part of the Schøyen Collection (MS 2375/08). These manuscripts are thought to have been part of a monastery library of the Mahāsāṃghika Lokottaravāda sect.

=== Additional Piṭakas ===
The Dharmaguptaka Tripiṭaka is said to have contained two extra sections that were not included by some other schools. These included a Bodhisattva Piṭaka and a Mantra Piṭaka (咒藏 Zhòu Zàng), also sometimes called a Dhāraṇī Piṭaka. According to the fifth-century Dharmaguptaka monk Buddhayaśas, the translator of the Dharmaguptaka Vinaya into Chinese, the Dharmaguptaka school had assimilated the "Mahāyāna Tripiṭaka" (大乘三藏 Dàchéng Sānzàng).

=== Abhiniṣkramaṇa Sūtra ===
The Dharmaguptaka biography of the Buddha is the most exhaustive of all classical biographies of the Buddha, and is entitled Abhiniṣkramaṇa Sūtra. Various Chinese translations of this text date from between the 3rd and 6th century CE.

== Relationship to Mahāyāna ==
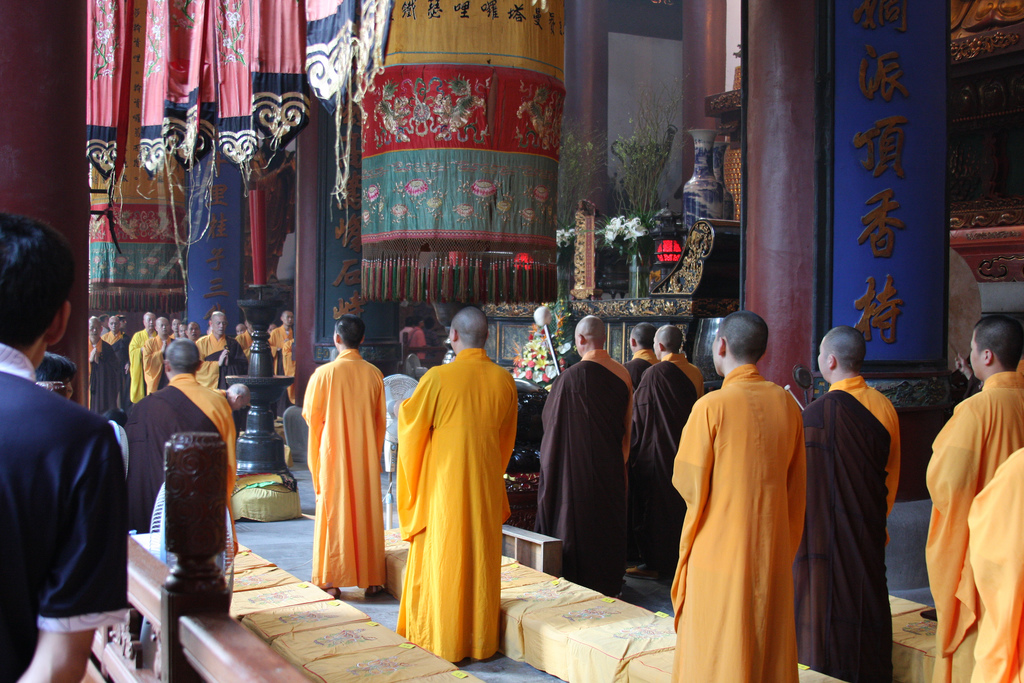
Bhikṣus performing a traditional Buddhist ceremony in Hangzhou, Zhejiang province, China

=== Kushan era ===
It is unknown when some members of the Dharmaguptaka school began to accept the Mahāyāna sūtras, but the Mañjuśrīmūlakalpa records that Kaniṣka (127–151 CE) of the Kuṣāṇa Empire presided over the establishment of Prajñāpāramitā doctrines in the northwest of India. Tāranātha wrote that in this region, 500 bodhisattvas attended the council at Jālandhra monastery during the time of Kaniṣka, suggesting some institutional strength for Mahāyāna in the northwest during this period. Edward Conze goes further to say that Prajñāpāramitā had great success in the northwest during the Kuṣāṇa period, and may have been the "fortress and hearth" of early Mahāyāna, but not its origin, which he associates with the Mahāsāṃghika branch.

=== Ugraparipṛcchā Sūtra ===
Jan Nattier writes that available textual evidence suggests that the Mahāyāna Ugraparipṛcchā Sūtra circulated in Dharmaguptaka communities during its early history, but a later translation shows evidence that the text later circulated amongst the Sarvāstivādins as well. The Ugraparipṛcchā also mentions a fourfold division of the Buddhist canon which includes a Bodhisattva Piṭaka, and the Dharmaguptaka are known to have had such a collection in their canon. Nattier further describes the type of community depicted in the Ugraparipṛcchā:

[T]he overall picture that the Ugra presents is quite clear. It describes a monastic community in which scriptures concerning the bodhisattva path were accepted as legitimate canonical texts (and their memorization a viable monastic specialty), but in which only a certain subset of monks were involved in the practices associated with the Bodhisattva Vehicle.

=== Ratnarāśivyākaraṇa Sūtra ===
The Mahāyāna Ratnarāśivyākaraṇa Sūtra, which is part of the Mahāratnakūṭa Sūtra, is believed by some scholars to have a Dharmaguptaka origin or background, due to its specific regulations regarding giving to the Buddha and giving to the Saṃgha.

=== Prajñāpāramitā sūtras ===
According to Joseph Walser, there is evidence that the Pañcaviṃśatisāhasrikā Prajñāpāramitā Sūtra ("The Perfection of Wisdom in 25,000 lines") and the Śatasāhasrikā Prajñāpāramitā Sūtra ("… in 100,000 lines") have a connection with the Dharmaguptaka sect, while the Aṣṭasāhasrikā Prajñāpāramitā Sūtra ("… in 8000 lines") does not. Instead, Guang Xing assesses the view of the Buddha given in the Aṣṭasāhasrikā Prajñāpāramitā Sūtra as being that of the Mahāsāṃghikas.

=== Buddhayaśas ===
The translator Buddhayaśas was a Dharmaguptaka monk who was known to be a Mahāyānist, and he is recorded as having learned both Hīnayāna and Mahāyāna treatises. He translated the Dharmaguptaka Vinaya, the Dīrgha Āgama, and Mahāyāna texts including the Ākāśagarbha Bodhisattva Sūtra (虛空藏菩薩經 Xūkōngzàng Púsà Jīng). The preface written by Buddhayaśas for his translation of the Dharmaguptaka Vinaya states that the Dharmaguptakas had assimilated the Mahāyāna Tripiṭaka.

=== Buddhist canon ===
The Dharmaguptakas were said to have had two extra sections in their canon:

1. Bodhisattva Piṭaka
2. Mantra Piṭaka or Dhāraṇī Piṭaka

In the 4th century Mahāyāna Abhidharma work Abhidharmasamuccaya, Asaṅga refers to the collection which contains the Āgamas as the Śrāvakapiṭaka, and associates it with the śrāvakas and pratyekabuddhas. Asaṅga classifies the Mahāyāna sūtras as belonging to the Bodhisattvapiṭaka, which is designated as the collection of teachings for bodhisattvas.

=== Paramārtha ===
Paramārtha, a 6th-century CE Indian monk from Ujjain, unequivocally associates the Dharmaguptaka school with the Mahāyāna, and portrays the Dharmaguptakas as being perhaps the closest to a straightforward Mahāyāna sect.

== See also ==
- Buddhism in Central Asia
- Schools of Buddhism
- Silk Road transmission of Buddhism
