= Guṇabhadra (Buddhist monk) =

Indian monk and translator of Mahayana Buddhism

- Born: 394 AD
- Died: 468 AD
- Occupation: Monk of Mahayana Buddhism

Gunabhadra (394–468; Sanskrit: गुणभद्र, simplified Chinese: 求那跋陀罗; traditional Chinese: 求那跋陀羅; pinyin: Qiúnàbátuóluó; Wade–Giles: Ch'iu-na-pa-t'o-lo) was a monk and translator of Mahayana Buddhism from Magadha, Central India. His biography is contained in the work of a Chinese monk called Sengyou entitled Chu sanzang ji ji.

== Life ==
Gunabhadra was said to have originally been born into a Brahman family but studied the Miśrakābhidharmahṛdaya under a Mahayana master which led to his conversion to Buddhism.

He traveled to China by sea with Gunavarma in 435 after first visiting Sri Lanka. They were both treated as honored guests by Emperor Wen of Liu Song, the ruler of South China at the time. In China, he translated one of the key Mahayana sutras, the Laṅkāvatāra Sūtra, from Sanskrit to Chinese, and Vekhanasa Sutra, which forms "a volume from the Issaikyō (a Buddhist corpus), commonly known as Jingo-ji kyō," as it was handed down at the Jingo-ji temple. Before translating the Laṅkāvatāra Sūtra, he was involved in the translation of the Saṃyuktāgama into Chinese. He continued to be active in other translations and preaching. His Chinese biography also details that he mastered the Tripiṭaka.

== Translations ==
CBETA lists the following sutra translations as Gunabhadra's:

- Lalitavistara Sūtra
- Śuka Sūtra
- Vekhanassa Sūtra
- Saṃyuktāgama
- Aṅgulimālīka Sūtra
- The Birth of Four People in the World Sūtra
- Eleven Contemplations of Mindfulness of the Tathāgata Sūtra
- Mahāmati Sūtra
- Sūtra on Past and Present causes and Effects
- Mahābherīhāraka Sūtra
- The Sūtra of the Bodhisattva's Practice of Skilful Means and Manifestation by Supernormal Powers amidst Sense Ranges
- The Śrīmāla Sūtra
- The Attainment of Birth in the Pure Land Dhāraṇī which Severs all Karmic Obstructions
- The Mahāvaipulya Anakṣarakaraṇḍaka Sūtra
- Mahākaśyapa Gives to his Mother Sautra
- The Past Life of the Boy Candra Sūtra
- The Jotiṣka Sūtra
- The Mahallikā Paripṛcchā Sūtra
- The Laṅkāvatara Sūtra
- The Saṃdhinirmocana Sūtra
- A separate translation of Chapter 9 of the Saṃdhinirmocana
- The retribution of Advantageous Rewards Sūtra
- The Punishments and Rewards of Turning the Wheel of the Five Paths Sūtra
- The Twelve Chapter Birth and Death Sūtra
- The Four Chapter Dharma Study Sūtra
- The Twelve Dhūta Practice Sūtra
- The Anantamukhasādhakadhāraṇī Sūtra
- The Abhidharmaprakaraṇapāda Śāstra
- The Piṇḍolabharadhvaja Teaches the Dharma to the King of Udayana Sūtra
