= The Shorter Chinese Saṃyukta Āgama =

The Shorter Chinese Saṃyukta Āgama or short Saṃyukta Āgama (Chinese:別譯雜阿含經 Taishō 100) is a second (the first being Saṃyukta Āgama, or Saṁyuktāgama), but plausibly incomplete Chinese translation of a rencension of the Saṃyukta Āgama (Chinese: 雜阿含經 Taishō 99); this translation is by an unknown translator, from around the Three Qin (三秦) period, 352-431 CE. Bingenheimer, who has specialized on this collection, rejects the widespread attribution of T 100 to the Kāśyapīya school.

It consists of 364 sutras and belongs to the early Chinese Buddhist texts collectively called Āgama sutras. Āgama literature constitutes the earliest part of Buddhist literature. However, the originals are largely lost, only a few fragments have survived.

== Version ==
The Shorter Chinese Saṃyukta Āgama exists in two versions. The version preserved as text no. 100 in the Taishō edition (Taishō 100) of the Chinese Buddhist canon is divided into sixteen fascicles, a format carried over from the Korean edition on which the compilers of the Taishō mainly relied. The other version, found in most editions produced in China itself, is instead divided into twenty fascicles. These two versions contain almost the same collection of sūtras, but differ in their arrangement. As regards the grouping into Saṃyuktas, the twenty-fascicle version is in good order while the sixteen-fascicle version is in disarray.

== Significance ==
The Āgama literature corresponds to the four Pāli Nikāyas that have been translated into Chinese in part or as a whole. In addition to the four main Chinese Āgamas, shorter texts containing partially preserved Āgama collections are extant in Chinese translation, alongside a number of single discourses translated individually. Comparative study of the contents of these discourse collections enables reconstructing early stages in the development of Buddhist doctrine and practice.

== See also ==
- Āgama
- Nikayas
