= Buddhayaśas =

Buddhist translator

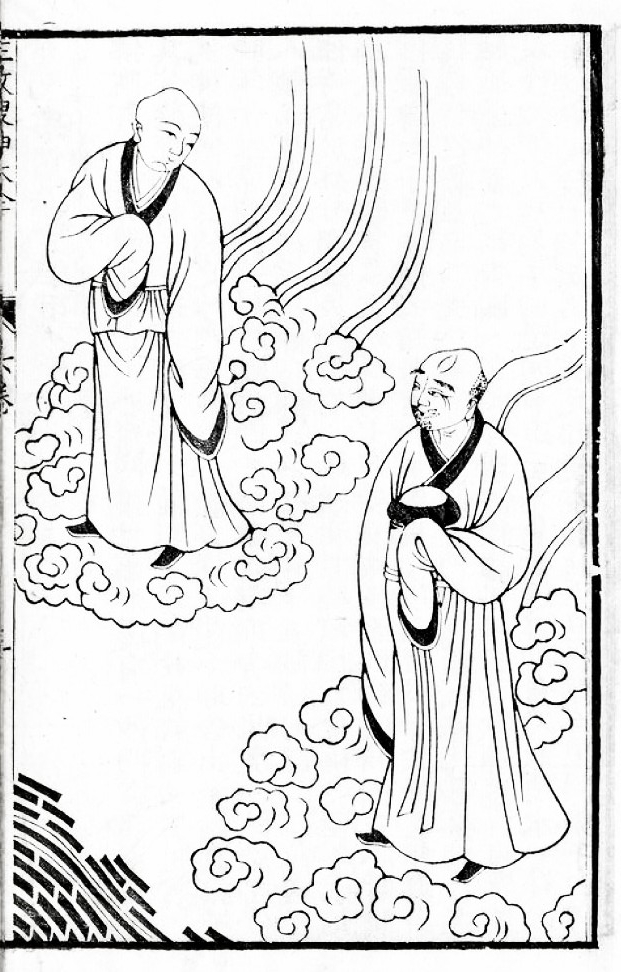
Buddhayaśas

Buddhayaśas was a Dharmaguptaka monk and translator. He is recorded as having learned both Śrāvakayāna and Mahāyāna treatises. He translated the Dharmaguptaka Vinaya, the Dīrgha Āgama, and other Mahāyāna texts including the Ākāśagarbha Bodhisattva Sūtra. Buddhayaśas' preface for his translation of the Dharmaguptaka Vinaya states that the Dharmaguptakas had assimilated the body of Mahāyāna sutras.
