= Bhikkhu Analayo =

Buddhist monk, scholar, and meditation teacher (born 1962)

Anālayo
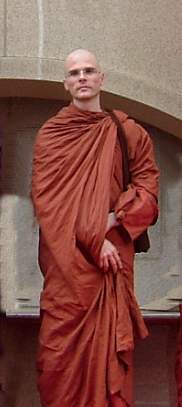

Personal life
- Born: 1962 (age 63–64)

Religious life
- Religion: Buddhism
- School: Theravada
- Sect: Amarapura–Rāmañña Nikāya
- Ordination: 1995

Senior posting
- Teacher: Pemasiri Thera
- Based in: Sri Lanka

Bhikkhu Anālayo is a bhikkhu (Buddhist monk), scholar, and meditation teacher. He was born in Germany in 1962, and went forth in 1995 in the Theravādin monastic tradition of Sri Lanka. He is best known for his comparative studies of Early Buddhist Texts as preserved by the various early Buddhist traditions.

== Monastic life ==
Bhikkhu Anālayo temporarily ordained in 1990 in Thailand, after a meditation retreat at Wat Suan Mokkh, the monastery established by the influential 20th-century Thai monk Ajahn Buddhadasa. In 1994 he went to Sri Lanka, looking to meet Nyanaponika Thera after having read his book The Heart of Buddhist Meditation. Nyanaponika Thera died just days before Analayo's arrival but he stayed on and studied with Bhikkhu Bodhi. In 1995 he took pabbajja again under Balangoda Ananda Maitreya Thero. He received his upasampada in 2007 in the Sri Lankan Shwegyin Nikaya (belonging to the main Amarapura Nikaya), with Pemasiri Thera of Sumathipala Aranya as his ordination acariya. Bhikkhu Bodhi has been Bhikkhu Anālayo's main mentor in the study of the Pāli discourses. The late Bhikkhu Kaṭukurunde Ñāṇananda has also been an important influence in his understanding of the Dhamma, whereas Godwin Samararatne has been the most influential meditation teacher in his early practice life.

== Scholarly career and activity ==
Bhikkhu Anālayo completed a PhD thesis on the Satipaṭṭhāna Sutta at the University of Peradeniya in 2000, which was later published as Satipaṭṭhāna, the Direct Path to Realization. During the course of that study, he had come to notice the interesting differences between the Pāli and Chinese Buddhist canon versions of this early Buddhist discourse. This led to his undertaking a habilitation research at the University of Marburg, completed in 2007, in which he compared the Majjhima Nikāya discourses with their Chinese, Buddhist Hybrid Sanskrit and Tibetan Buddhist canon counterparts. In 2013 Anālayo then published Perspectives on Satipaṭṭhāna, where he builds on his earlier work by comparing the parallel versions of the Satipaṭṭhāna-sutta and exploring the meditative perspective that emerges when emphasis is given to those instructions that are common ground among the extant canonical versions and thus can reasonably well be expected to be early.

Bhikkhu Anālayo has published extensively on early Buddhism. The textual study of early Buddhist discourses in comparative perspective is the basis of his ongoing interests and academic research. At present he is the chief editor and one of the translators of the first English translation of the Chinese Madhyama-āgama (Taishō 26), and has undertaken a partial English translation of the Chinese Saṃyukta-āgama (Taishō 99), parallel to the Pali Saṃyutta Nikāya collection.

Anālayo has published several articles on insight and absorption meditation and related contemporary meditation traditions to their textual sources, but has also provided "suggestions and inspiration for actual meditation practice" related to the Satipaṭṭhāna-sutta, the 16 steps of mindfulness of breathing, brahmavihāra and emptiness meditation.

His comparative studies of early Buddhist texts have also led Anālayo to focus on historical developments of Buddhist thought, and to research the early roots and genesis of the bodhisattva ideal and the beginning of Abhidharma thought. He has also studied the earliest extant Prajñāpāramitā text from the viewpoint of continuities and discontinuities with early Buddhism.

Anālayo has published critiques of several contemporary Western teachers and movements, at least in part based on what he perceives to be inaccurate representation of Pali discourses, including Daniel Ingram, Rob Burbea, and Stephen Batchelor and Secular Buddhism broadly.

Bhikkhu Anālayo was a presenter at the International Congress on Buddhist Women's Role in the Sangha. Exploring attitudes towards bhikkhunis (female monastics) in early Buddhist texts and the story of the foundation of the bhikkhuni order has allowed him to be a supporter of bhikkhuni ordination, which is a matter of controversy in the Theravada and Tibetan traditions. He has presented his overall assessment in book form, which combines the original English text with a Sinhala translation: Bhikkhunī Ordination from Ancient India to Contemporary Sri Lanka. Consequently, a ruling of the supreme court of Sri Lanka in 2025 implicitly recognized the validity of the revival of bhikkhunī ordination.

Bhikkhu Anālayo has retired from being a professor of the Numata Centre for Buddhist Studies at the University of Hamburg. He is the co-founder of the Āgama Research Group and a resident scholar at the Barre Center for Buddhist Studies.

== Selected published work ==
- Satipaṭṭhāna, the Direct Path to Realization (PDF). Windhorse Publications. 2003. ISBN 978-1899579549.
- Perspectives on Satipaṭṭhāna (PDF). Windhorse Publications. 2013.
- From Craving to Liberation (PDF). Excursions into the Thought-world of the Pali Discourses. Vol. 1. Buddhist Association of the United States. 2009.
- From Grasping to Emptiness (PDF). Excursions into the Thought-world of the Pali Discourses. Vol. 2. Buddhist Association of the United States. 2010.
- The Genesis of the Bodhisattva Ideal (PDF). Hamburg University Press. 2010.
- A Comparative Study of the Majjhima-nikāya (Dharma Drum Buddhist College Research Series 3). Dharma Drum Publishing Corporation. 2011.
- The Madhyama Agama: Middle-length Discourses: 1 (BDK English Tripitaka). BDK America. 2013. ISBN 978-1886439474. *co-editor
- "The Legality of Bhikkhunī Ordination" (PDF). 20. Journal of Buddhist Ethics, Special 20th Anniversary Issue, D. Keown and C. Prebish (ed.). 2013: 310–333. Archived from the original (PDF) on 14 August 2014. (reprinted as a booklet together with translations into Sinhala, Thai and Burmese: West Malaysia: Selangor Buddhist Vipassanā Meditation Society, 2013; and New York: Buddhist Association of the United States, 2014). PDF
- Perspectives on Satipaṭṭhāna. Birmingham: Windhorse Publications. 2014. ISBN 978-1909314030.
- Compassion and Emptiness in Early Buddhist Meditation. Birmingham: Windhorse Publications. 2015. ISBN 978-1909314559.
- The Foundation History of the Nuns' Order. Bochum/Freiburg: Projektverlag. 2016. ISBN 978-3-89733-387-1.
- Early Buddhist Meditation Studies (Volume 1). Barre Center for Buddhist Studies. 2017. ISBN 978-1540410504.
- Mindfully Facing Disease and Death: Compassionate Advice from Early Buddhist Texts. Windhorse Publications. 2017. ISBN 978-1909314726.
- A Meditator's Life of the Buddha: Based on the Early Discourses. Windhorse Publications. 2018. ISBN 978-1909314993.
- Rebirth in Early Buddhism and Current Research. Wisdom Publications. 2018. ISBN 978-1614294467.
- Satipatthana Meditation: A Practice Guide. Windhorse Publications. 2018. ISBN 978-1911407102.
- Mindfulness of Breathing: A Practice Guide and Translations. Windhorse Publications. 2019. ISBN 978-1911407447.
- Analayo (著), Bhikkhu; Döll, Steffen (編); Zimmermann, Michael (編) (2017). Buddhapada and the Bodhisattva Path. Projekt Verlag. p. 180. ISBN 978-3897334151.
- Anālayo, Bhikkhu (2024). "Early Buddhist Meditation, Part 1: The Immeasurables". Mindfulness. 15: 253–256. doi:10.1007/s12671-023-02252-y.
