= Taishō Tripiṭaka =

Japanese edition of the Chinese Buddhist canon

The Taishō Tripiṭaka (Japanese: 大正新脩大蔵経, Hepburn: Taishō Shinshū Daizōkyō; Kyujitai: 大正新脩大藏經; lit. '"Taishō Revised Tripiṭaka') is a definitive edition of the Chinese Buddhist canon and its Japanese commentaries used by scholars in the 20th century. The name is abbreviated as "大正藏" in Japanese (Taishōzō).

== Development ==
The Taishō Tripiṭaka project was initiated by the Department of Sanskrit and Indian Studies at Tokyo Imperial University. It was edited by Takakusu Junjiro, Watanabe Kaigyoku, and others. More than 300 people contributed to the compilation.

The editors were educated in both Japan and Europe and their goals included modernization and meeting European academic standards, in addition to creation of a resource for Buddhist practitioners. The project adopted several innovations of previous Japanese editions of the Buddhist canon, including punctuation, indexing, and collation. The texts were collated and verified against other versions of the canon, building on the work of the Reduced Print Edition, published from 1880 to 1885. It used a sequential numerical numbering scheme for texts, as did the Manji Edition, in contrast to the Thousand Character Classic indexing approach used by previous Chinese and Korean versions of the canon. The Taishō Tripiṭaka uses footnotes to indicate the origin of the texts. While most texts are from the Tripitaka Koreana, the Taishō Tripiṭaka uses a different ordering based on a combination of historical development and textual classification, abandoning the Chinese and Korean tradition of placing Mahāyāna scriptures first.

The Taishō Tripiṭaka includes an expanded number of Esoteric texts in comparison to the Tripitaka Koreana. These texts were sourced from manuscripts in Japanese temples. Several texts from Dunhuang manuscripts, found in archeological expeditions, were included. In addition, drawings and Japanese Buddhist literature is included in the Taishō Tripiṭaka.

== Contents ==
Volumes 1–85 are the literature, in which volumes 56–84 are Japanese Buddhist literature, written in Classical Chinese. Volumes 86–97 are Buddhism related drawings, includes drawings of many Buddhas and bodhisattvas. Volumes 98–100 are texts of different indexes of Buddhist texts known in Japan ca. 1930. The 100 volumes of literature contains 5,320 individual texts, classified as follows.

Volume	Order	Name	Chinese (Pinyin)	Japanese	Sanskrit	Description
T01–02	1–151	阿含部	Āhán bù	Agon-bu	Āgama	Āgama Section
T03–04	152–219	本緣部	Běnyuán bù	Hon'en-bu	Jātaka	Birth Stories
T05–08	220–261	般若部	Bōrě bù	Hannya-bu	Prajñapāramitā	Perfection of Wisdom
T09a	262–277	法華部	Fǎhuá bù	Hokke-bu	Saddharma Puṇḍarīka	The Lotus Sūtra
T09b–10	278–309	華嚴部	Huáyán bù	Kegon-bu	Avataṃsaka	Flower Garland
T11–12a	310–373	寶積部	Bǎojī bù	Hōshaku-bu	Ratnakūṭa	Jewel Peak
T12b	374–396	涅槃部	Nièpán bù	Nehan-bu	Nirvāṇa	The Parinirvāṇa
T13	397–424	大集部	Dàjí bù	Daishū-bu	Mahāsannipāta	The Great Collection
T14–17	425–847	經集部	Jīngjí bù	Kyōshū-bu	Sūtrasannipāta	Collected Sūtras
T18–21	848–1420	密教部	Mìjiào bù	Mikkyō-bu	Tantra	Esoteric Teachings
T22–24	1421–1504	律部	Lǜ bù	Ritsu-bu	Vinaya	Monastic Discipline
T25–26a	1505–1535	釋經論部	Shìjīnglùn bù	Shakukyōron-bu	Sūtravyākaraṇa	Sūtra Explanations
T26b–29	1536–1563	毗曇部	Pítán bù	Bidon-bu	Abhidharma	Systematic Analyses
T30a	1564–1578	中觀部類	Zhōngguān bùlèi	Chūgan-burui	Mādhyamaka	Mādhyamaka Texts
T30b–31	1579–1627	瑜伽部類	Yújiā bùlèi	Yuga-burui	Yogācāra	Yogācāra Texts
T32	1628–1692	論集部	Lùnjí bù	Ronshū-bu	Śāstra	Treatises
T33–39	1693–1803	經疏部	Jīngshū bù	Kyōsho-bu	Sūtravibhāṣa	Sūtra Clarifications
T40a	1804–1815	律疏部	Lǜshū bù	Rissho-bu	Vinayavibhāṣa	Vinaya Clarifications
T40b–44a	1816–1850	論疏部	Lùnshū bù	Ronsho-bu	Śāstravibhāṣa	Śāstra Clarifications (sub-commentaries)
T44b–48	1851–2025	諸宗部	Zhūzōng bù	Shoshū-bu	Sarvasamaya	Sectarian Teachings (Nichiren etc.)
T49–52	2026–2120	史傳部	Shǐchuán bù	Shiden-bu		Histories
T53–54a	2121–2136	事彙部	Shìhuì bù	Jii-bu		Cyclopedia
T54b	2137–2144	外教部	Wàijiào bù	Gekyō-bu		Non-Buddhist Texts (Hinduism, Taoism, Manichaeism, Nestorianism, etc.)
T55	2145–2184	目錄部	Mùlù bù	Mokuroku-bu		Catalogues
T56–83	2185–2700	續經疏部	Xùjīngshū bù	Zokukyōsho-bu		Additional Sūtra Clarifications (influential Japanese sub-commentaries)
T84	2701–2731	悉曇部	Xītán bù	Shittan-bu	Siddhaṃ	Siddhaṃ Script (esoteric script imported to Japan by Kūkai)
T85a	2732–2864	古逸部	Gǔyì bù	Koitsu-bu		Ancient
T85b	2865–2920	疑似部	Yísì bù	Giji-bu		Doubtful
T86–97		圖像部	Túxiàng bù	Zuzō-bu		Illustrations (exegesis of standard Buddhist imagery, with inserts)
T98–100		昭和法寶 總目錄	Zhāohé fǎbǎo zǒngmùlù	Shōwa Hōbō; Sōmokuroku		Shōwa Treasures of the Faith (catalogs of scripture collections and canon editions)

== Digitalization ==
The SAT Daizōkyō Text Database edition contains volumes 1–85. The Chinese Buddhist Electronic Text Association (CBETA) edition contains volumes 1–55 and 85. The Fomei edition (佛梅電子大藏經) contains texts in Classical Chinese other than Nichiren Buddhism.

Volumes 56–84, although they were written in Classical Chinese, were composed by Japanese Buddhist scholars.

== Bibliography ==
- Matsumoto, T. (1934), ""Taishō Shinshū Daizōkyō" oder kurz "Taishō Issaikyō"", Zeitschrift der Deutschen Morgenländischen Gesellschaft 88 (n.F. 13), No. 2, 194-199
