= Kaibao Canon =

Buddhist texts of the Northern Song dynasty

The Kaibao Canon (開寶藏), also known as the Shu edition (蜀版), since it was printed in Sichuan, and sometimes known as the Northern Song canon (北宋刊経) was a woodblock printed collection of Buddhist texts produced in the Northern Song dynasty.

The Kaibao Canon was lost but formed the basis for other canons, notably the Tripitaka Koreana. We also know its contents, since it was based on the Kaiyuan Shijiao Lu (開元釋教錄), which is included in the Taishō Tripiṭaka.

It was the first printed edition of a Chinese Buddhist canon, and effectively closed the canon.

It was begun in 971 and completed in 983.
