= Jingo-ji Tripiṭaka =

Japanese scroll collection of the Tripitaka

The Jingo-ji Tripiṭaka is a Japanese collection of the Tripiṭaka (Chinese Buddhist canon) composed of over 5400 scrolls made of Indigo dyed paper, and written in golden ink. Created in the twilight of the Heian period, throughout the Genpei War, the compilation of the canon was commissioned by Emperor Toba and Emperor Go-Shirakawa from 1150 to 1185. The scrolls were then deposited in Jingo-ji, Ukyō-ku, Kyoto. In the years since, 2317 scrolls remained with the temple while many others have been scattered into private collections and museums around the world.

== History ==
Since the introduction of Buddhism in Japan, handwritten sutra copying was deemed a sacred act of worthy merit. Copying the issaikyo, the Tripitaka, in particular is known to be an ambitious act, which requires the standard handwriting of 5400 scrolls to complete the canon.

During the late Heian period, the speculation of Mappo, the decline of the Dharma and thus Buddhist teaching, circulated widely in the Imperial Court. As such, copies of the issaikyo were commissioned by the royalty and the nobility to improve the chances of entering the Pure Land. From 1149 to 1185, Emperor Toba initiated the Jingo-ji copies until his death in 1156, thereupon Go-Shirakawa commissioned the rest of the Canon over the ensuing decades, completing the transcription in 1185, according to the Jingo-ji Ryakki (Records of Jingo-ji) during the Nanboku-chō period.

The standard format of the Jingo-ji canon is recognized by the indigo paper with silver lines, the dye symbolizing the lapis lazuli of the spiritual realm. The sutra text written in gold, which was defined as the radiant light of the Buddha. The front piece features a gold and silver painting of The Buddha teaching the Dharma at Vulture Peak. A red rectangular stamp on each scroll designates the original ownership at Jingo-ji.

Of the 5400 scrolls copied, by the 18th century, 4722 were inventoried at the temple. In the 19th century, hundreds of scrolls were sold by the temple to finance repairs to the building, some others were stolen. 2317 scrolls remain at Jingo-ji, and on 30 May 1949, they were deemed an Important Cultural Property of Japan under designated serial number 01056.

== Extant Scrolls in Outside Collections ==
Due to the dispersion of the scrolls during the 19th century, specimens sometimes appear in the art market and over the course of the past century, different portions of the canon are now owned by museums around the world, including the Metropolitan Museum of Art, British Museum, Minneapolis Institute of Art, and various private collections.

Name/Sutra Text	Format	Present Location	Credit Line & Accession Number	Image
Jingoji Sutra and Wrapper	25.8 cm (28.9 cm with knobs) × 1,289 cm	Art Institute of Chicago	Purchased with Funds Provided by the Weston Foundation (2008.157)	
Hachi dai-bosatsu mandara kyo (八大菩薩曼荼羅経) - Sutra of the Eight Great Bodhisattvas Mandala	25.7 cm x 145.80 cm	British Museum	ex. Sorimachi Shigeo 反町茂雄 Charles E Tuttle & Co (1958,0510,0.3)	
Illustrated Sutra (Jingoji)	10 x 164 1/4in (25.5 x 417.2 cm)	Bonhams	Fine Japanese and Korean Art, 15 September 2015; sold for US$13750	
Bussetsu daiai dohatsu deionkyo (佛説大愛道般泥洹経)	10 1/8 x 150 7/8in (25.7 x 383.4 cm) 11 1/2in (29.2 cm) height with rollers	Bonhams	Fine Japanese and Korean Art, 15 March 2017; sold for US$17500	
Avaivartikacakra Sutra	10 1/8 x 468 in. (25.6 x 1188 cm.)	Christie's	Japanese and Korean Art Auction; 18 April 2018	
Sutra with Frontispiece Depicting the Preaching Buddha	10 1/8 x 134 1/2 in. (25.7 x 341.6 cm)	Cincinnati Art Museum	John J. Emery Fund (1985.12)	
Sutra Scroll from Jingo-ji Temple: The Buddha's Teaching at Anupiya	10 in × 123 inches (25.4 cm × 312.4 cm)	Detroit Institute of Arts	Detroit Institute of Arts, Founders Society Purchase, L. A. Young Fund, (61.5)	
Jingo-ji Temple Sutra		Grolier Club	Collection of Alan Feinstein	
Illustrated "Vajra-Sckhara-yoga-homa-kolpa" (J: Kongōchō-yuga-goma)	10 3/16 x 167 in (25.8 x 424.2 cm)	Harvard Art Museums	Harvard Art Museums/Arthur M. Sackler Museum, Gift of John Crawford (1961.142)	
Jingo-ji Sutra (Jingoji-kyō)	10 1/8 x 45 7/8 in (25.7 x 116.5 cm)	Harvard Art Museums	Harvard Art Museums/Arthur M. Sackler Museum, Bequest of the Hofer Collection of the Arts of Asia (1985.368)	
Makasōgiritsu kandaisan mikaeshi-e (摩訶僧祇律巻第三見返絵) Illustrated Frontispiece to the Mahâsângha Vinaya (Great Canon of Monastic Rules), chapter 3	10 1/4 x 610 1/4 in. (26 x 1550 cm)	Honolulu Museum of Art	Gift of Robert Allerton, 1952 (1673.1a)	
Bussetsu Daianhanshuikyo	25.8 cm x 1493 cm	Kyoto National Museum	ex. Moriya Yoshitaka (BK100)	
Daichidoron (Commentary on the Great Wisdom Sutra)		Kyoto National Museum	ex. Moriya Yoshitaka (BK101)	
紺紙金字大方等頂王	25.8 x 914.1 cm	Kyushu National Museum		
Illustrated Frontispiece to the Sutra of Enlightenment through the Accumulation of Merit and Virtue, the So-called Jingoji Sutra	10 3/16 in. x 27 ft. 6 9/16 in. (25.8 x 839.7 cm)	Metropolitan Museum of Art	The Harry G. C. Packard Collection of Asian Art, Gift of Harry G. C. Packard, and Purchase, Fletcher, Rogers, Harris Brisbane Dick, and Louis V. Bell Funds, Joseph Pulitzer Bequest, and The Annenberg Fund Inc. Gift, 1975 (1975.268.17)	
"Scroll 13"	25.8 cm x 610.3 cm	Miho Museum		
Chapter from the Expanded Flower Garland Sutra	10 1/8 × 148 11/16 in. (25.72 × 377.67 cm)	Minneapolis Institute of Art	Dawson's Book Shop until 1964; Mary Griggs Burke and Jackson Burke Foundation (2015.79.21)	
Makasōgi-ritsu (Mahāsaṅghika-vinaya), Vol.19	26 cm x 1386 cm	Nara National Museum	811-1	
Kimonmokuren-gyō (Kimonmokuren-gyō-sūtra)	25.7 cm x 187.8 cm	Nara National Museum	811-2	
Kongōzanmai-kyō (Vajra-samādhi-sūtra), Vol.2	25.8 cm x 688.7 cm	Nara National Museum	811-3	
Dōjinsokumugokuhenge-kyō (Dōjinsokumugokuhenge-kyō-sūtra), Vol.2	25.9 cm x 1272.5 cm	Nara National Museum	811-4	
Heart Sutra, Hannyashin-gyō (Prajñāpāramitā-hṛdaya-sūtra)	25.7 cm x 74.1 cm	Nara National Museum	928-0	
Bimosu Jing (鞸摩粛経)		National Diet Library	Hosted via the World Digital Library by the Library of Congress (2021667443)	
Sutra of Incantations for Sustaining the Thunderbolt Life (Kongojumyodarani-kyo)	9 1/2 x 47 1/2 in (24.1 x 120.6 cm)	National Museum of Asian Art - Smithsonian Institution	Purchase — Charles Lang Freer Endowment (F1985.36a-f)	
Divisions of Vowed Morality Sutra (J: Konponsetsu issai ubu binya; Skt: Mūlasarvāstivada nikaya vinaya sūtra), Volume 7, Book 3, Chapter 2	10 3/16 x 348 7/16 in.(25.9 x 885.0 cm.)	Princeton University Art Museum	Museum purchase, Caroline G. Mather Fund (y1959-121)	
The "Sutra of the Sages with the Five Blessings		Tokyo National Museum	Gift of Mr. Matsunaga Yasuzaemon (B-2437)	

== See also ==
- Tripitaka Koreana
- Taishō Tripiṭaka
