= Zhaocheng Jin Tripitaka =

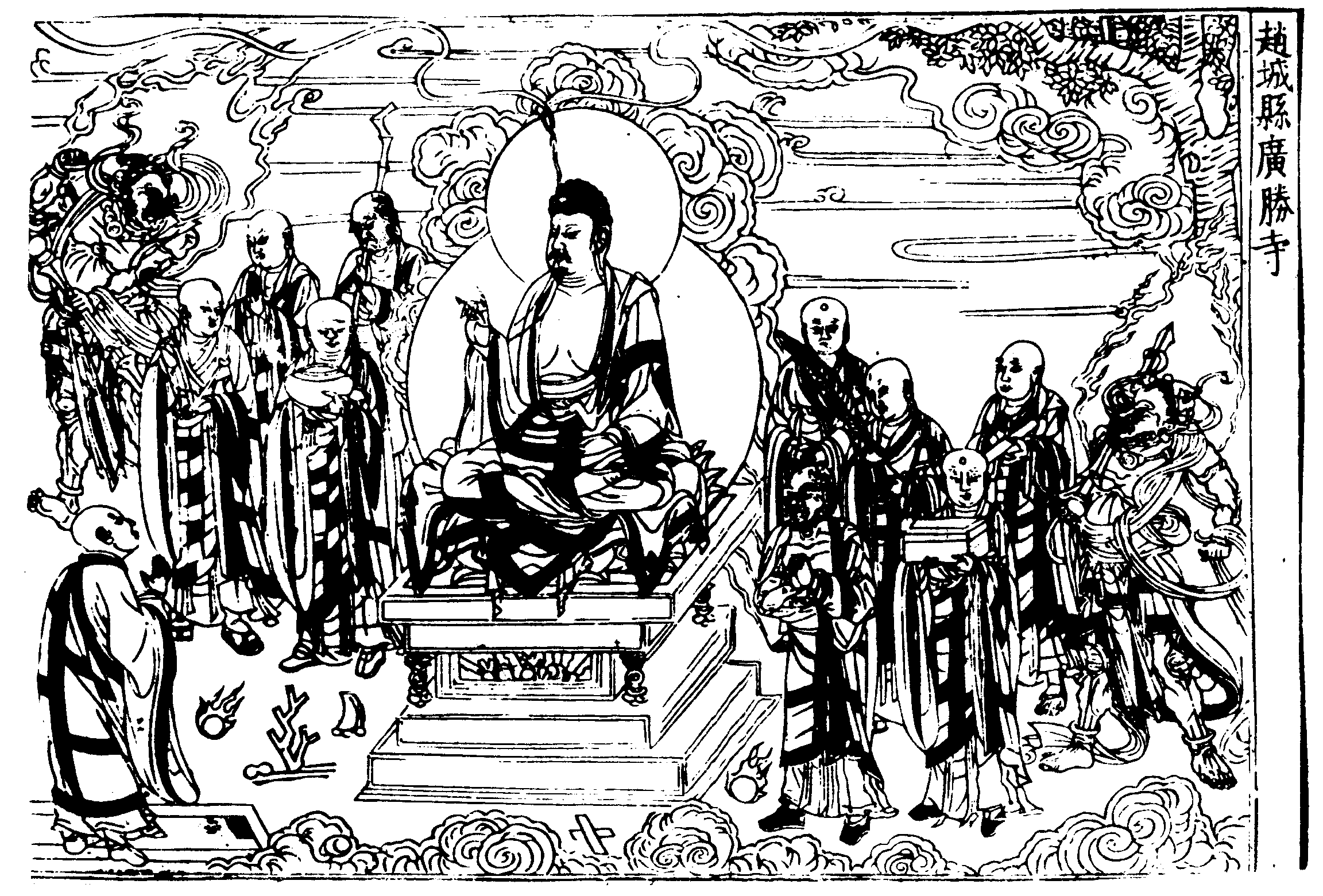
An illustration from the Zhaocheng Jin Tripitaka

The Zhaocheng Jin Tripitaka (Chinese: 趙城金藏) is a Chinese copy of the Buddhist canon dating from the Jin dynasty (1115–1234).

The Jin Tripitaka was originally created at the Tianning Temple in today Shanxi province around 1149, funded by donations from a woman named Cui Fazhen and her followers. It was presented by Kublai Khan, founder of the Yuan dynasty, to the Guangsheng Temple in Pingyang (modern Linfen), where it was rediscovered in 1933. Since the Guangsheng Temple is located in Zhaocheng, Hongtong, the document was renamed the Zhaocheng Jin Tripitaka.

With around 7,000 chapters, it is the longest extant printed work of the Jin dynasty. It contains a number of sutras which are missing from subsequent editions of the canon.
