= Zhisheng =

Chinese Buddhist monk and bibliographer

Zhìshēng (Chinese: 智昇) was a Chinese Buddhist monk and bibliographer from the Tang dynasty. Little is known about his life, but it is known that he became a monk early in his life and studied Mahayana and Theravada doctrines, and was particularly knowledgeable on the Vinaya. He is best known for his Catalogue of Śākyamuṇi’s Teachings of the Kaiyuan Era of the Great Tang Era (Chinese: 大唐開元釋教錄; pinyin: Dà Táng Kāiyuán Shìjiào Lù) or simply the Kaiyuan Catalogue (T2154) completed in 730 CE. This was significant because the organisation of it formed the basic structure of the Chinese Buddhist Tripiṭaka. "It is generally considered the single most important bibliographical catalogue in terms of the role it played in the history of East Asia Buddhist Canonical publications".

It is likely that Zhisheng's catalogue proved decisive because it was used to reconstruct the Canon after the persecutions of 845 CE; however, it was also considered a "perfect synthesis of the entire four-hundred-year development of a proper Chinese form of the Canon."

== Bibliography ==
- Storch, T. (2014). The History of Chinese Buddhist Bibliography. Amherst, NY: Cambria Press.
- Tokuno, Kyoko. (1990). 'The Evaluation of Indigenous Scriptures in Chinese Buddhist Bibliographical Catalogues' in Chinese Buddhist Apocrypha, edited by Robert E Buswell. University of Hawaii Press, 31–74.
