= Guangsheng Temple =

Buddhist temple in Shanxi, China

Coordinates: 36°18′06″N 111°48′23″E

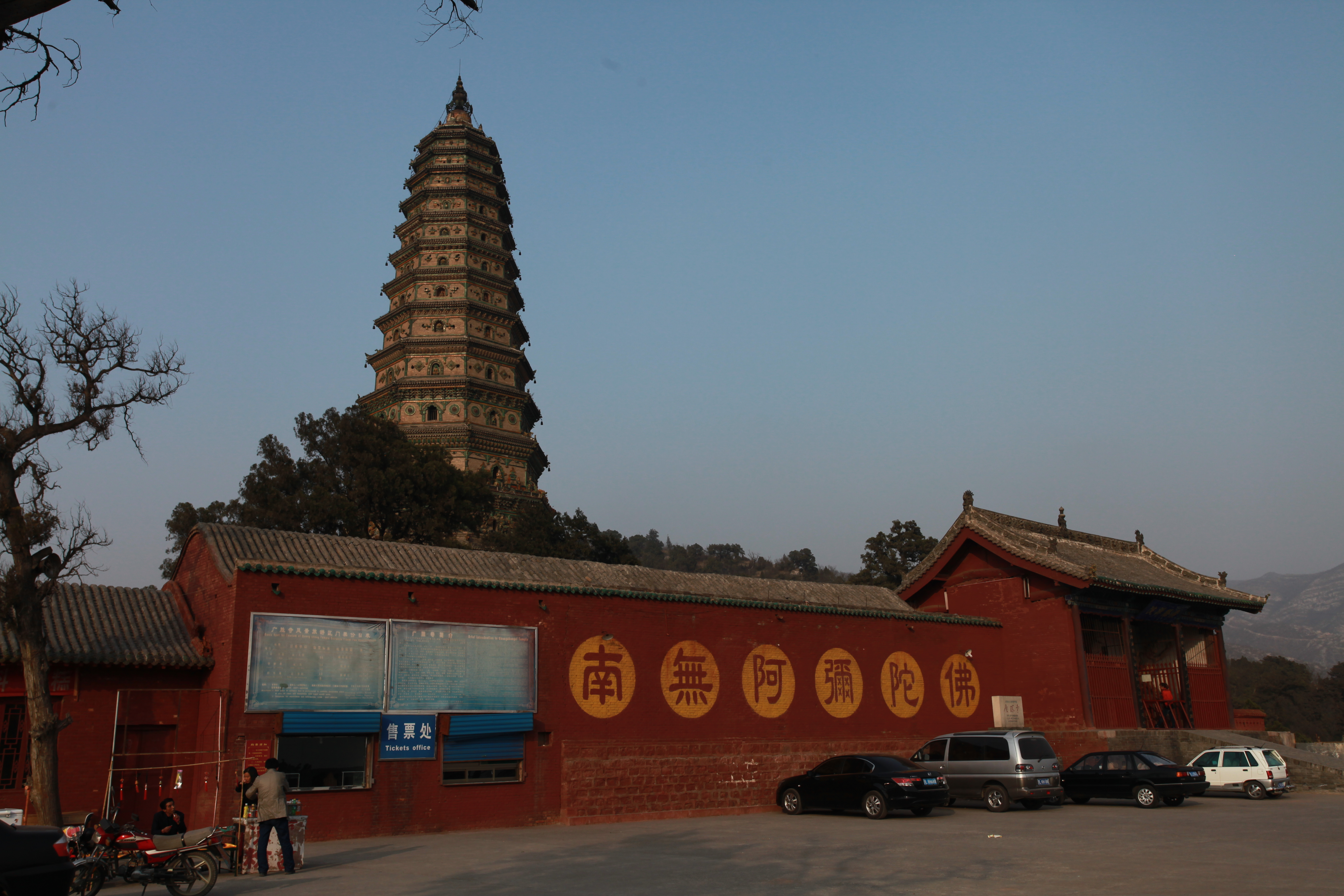
Guangsheng Temple

The Guangsheng Temple (Chinese: 广胜寺) is a Buddhist temple, located at the southern foot of Mt. Huoshan, 17 km northeast of Hongtong County, Shanxi, China. The temple was built in 147 and was changed to its present name in the Tang dynasty. It has three parts: the upper temple, the lower temple and the Shuishen Temple (Temple of Water God). The drama murals from the Yuan dynasty are kept in the lower temple.

The famous Zhaocheng Jin Tripitaka was discovered at the Guangsheng Temple in 1933.
