= Yongmunsa =

Buddhist temple in Yangpyeong, South Korea

- 용문사
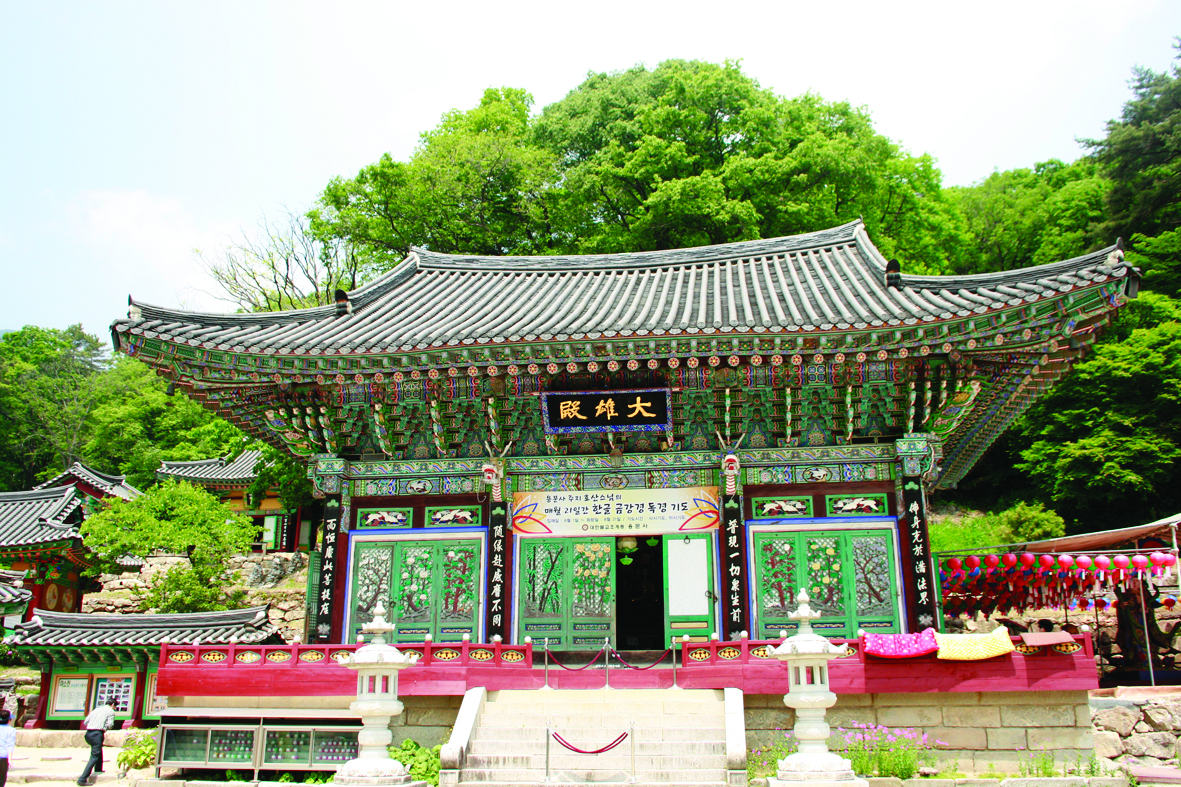
- Yongmunsa Temple in South Korea

Religion
- Affiliation: Jogye Order

Location
- Location: 782 Yongmunsan-ro Yongmun-myeon Yangpyeong-gun Gyeonggi Province (Korean: 경기도 양평군 용문면 용문산로 782)
- Country: South Korea
- Interactive map of Yongmunsa
- Coordinates: 37°33′00.5″N 127°34′15.9″E

Architecture
- Founder: Daegyeong

Yongmunsa (Korean: 용문사, Dragon's Gate Temple) is a Buddhist temple of the Jogye Order in Yangpyeong county, South Korea.

== History ==
=== Founding ===
Yongmunsa Temple was established in 913 by the monk Daegyeong, who was originally from the Nampo region in southern Korea. He had been ordained at Muryangsa Temple, and learned meditation from the Seon master Muyeom. Daegyeong later traveled to Tang China to study under Yunju Daoying. Upon his return to Korea, he lived in seclusion on Mount Sobaek. One day, King Taejo, founder of the Goryeo Dynasty, visited Daegyeong and listened to his lectures on the dharma. Impressed, the king invited Daegyong to Borisa Temple in Yangpyeong, which was probably an earlier name for today's Yongmunsa.

Another story relates that the temple was established by Crown Prince Maui, the last prince of Unified Silla.

=== Joseon Dynasty ===
No records from the Goryeo Dynasty exist about Yongmunsa Temple, but references to it began to appear in records from the Joseon Dynasty (1392–1897).

A stupa and stele can be found on the slope of a mountain east of Yongmunsa, erected in memory of Jeongji, a National Preceptor, a high-ranking position among Buddhist clergy. Originally from Hwanghae Province, Jeongji went to Beijing with his dharma brother, Muhak (1327-1405). Together, they visited Fayuan Temple, and met with the Indian monk Dhyānabhadra. Later, Jeongji studied under the teacher Hyegun.

Jeongji died in 1338. According to legend, many shining śarīra relics were collected from his ashes after his cremation. King Taejo bestowed on him the posthumous title of Guksa ("National Preceptor"), and had Gwon Geun, an esteemed writer of the time, write an epitaph to be inscribed on his stele.

In 1447, Prince Suyang reconstructed the main Buddha hall for his mother, Queen Consort Soheon, under the royal decree of King Sejong. The Prince continued to support the renovation of Yongmunsa Temple even after being crowned King Sejo. The temple underwent many reconstructions after this.

=== Korean Empire ===
Much of Yongmunsa Temple was burned down by the Imperial Japanese Army in 1907. The temple had been used as headquarters for Korean militias, which prompted its destruction when the Japanese forcibly disbanded the militias. Most of the buildings now at Yongmunsa Temple were reconstructed after 1909.

== Cultural properties ==
Several elements of the temple have been designated by the South Korean government as national cultural properties.

- Natural Monument No. 30: An enormous gingko tree on the temple grounds, believed to be the largest in Asia, and estimated to be 1100 to 1500 years old. It is 42 meters high and 14 meters in circumference at the base. It yields 100 straw bags of gingko nuts every year.
- Treasure No. 1790: A gilt-bronze statue of Avalokitesvara, produced during the time Jeongji lived at Yongmusa Temple during the transition period from Goryeo to Joseon. It is considered a fine example of medieval Korean Buddhist sculpture.
- Treasure No. 531: The stupa and memorial stele of Jeongji, showing the simple but graceful style of the early Joseon era.

== Gallery ==
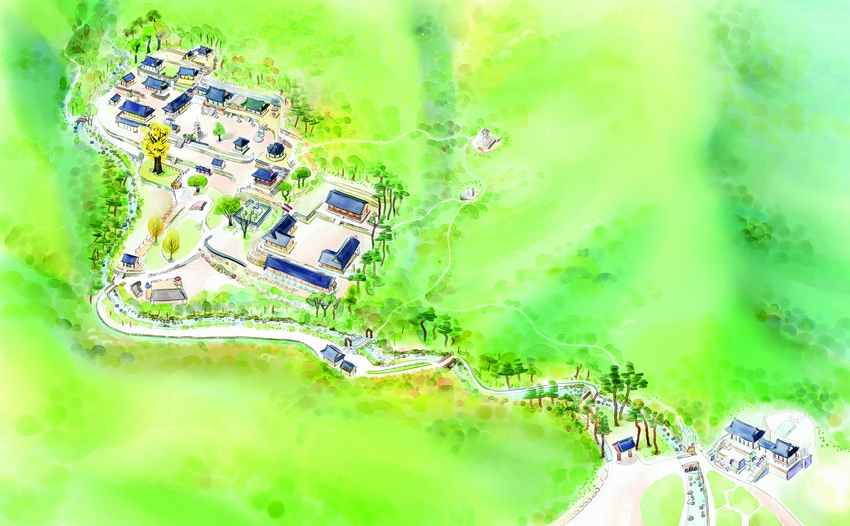
Layout of the temple grounds

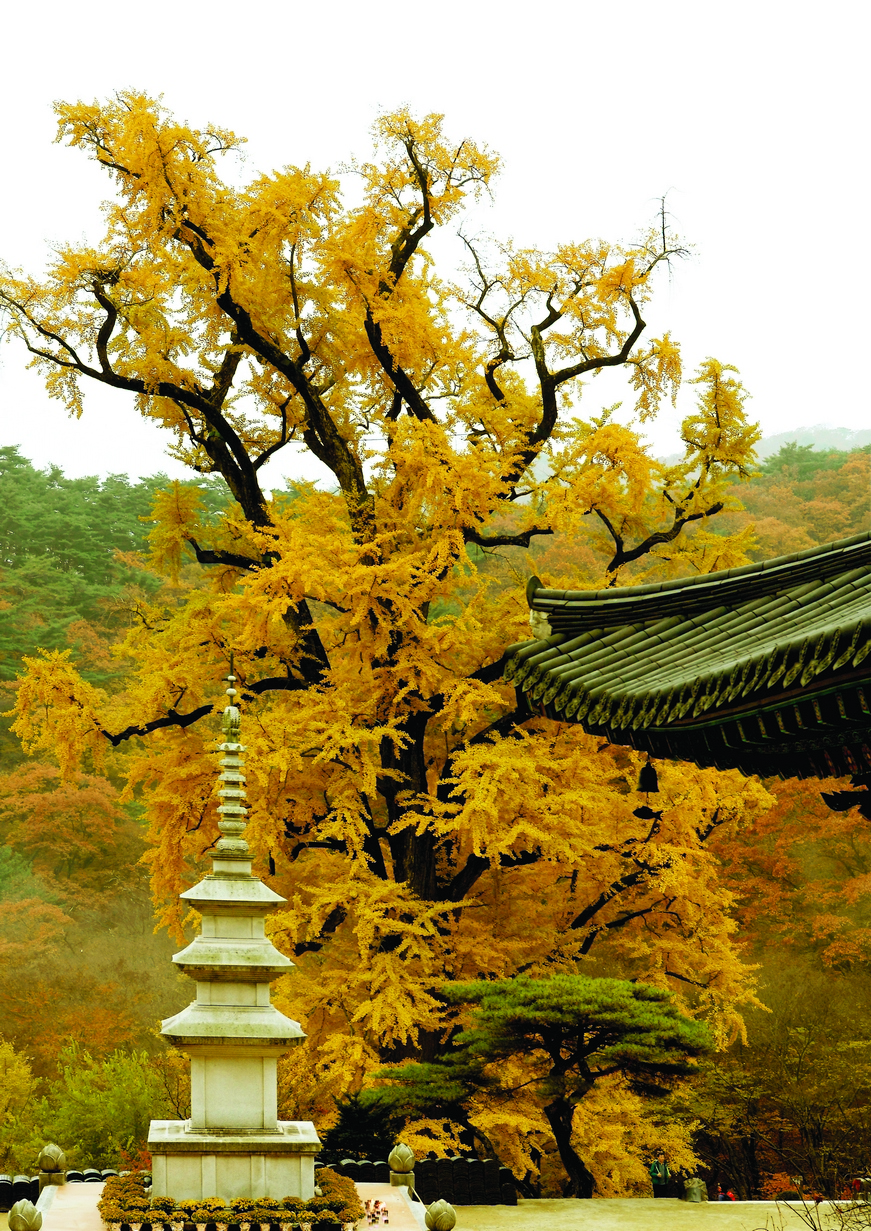
The large gingko tree, a designated natural monument

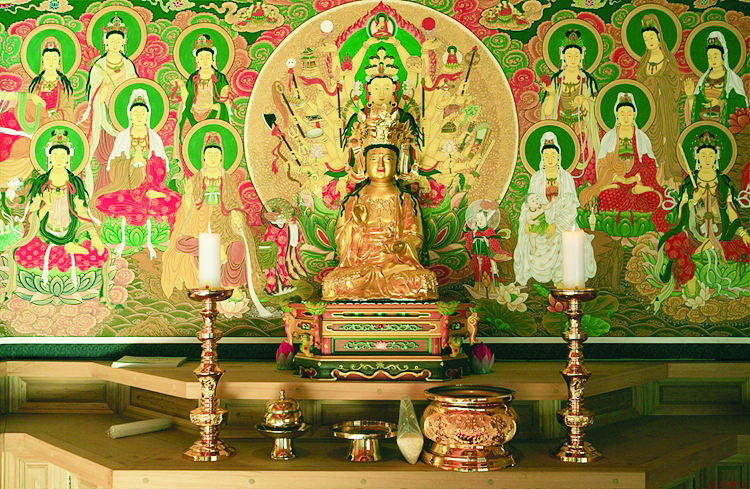
Gilt bronze statue of Avalokitesvara, a designated natural treasure
