= Fei Changfang =

Chinese Buddhist monk, biographer and bibliographer

Fei Changfang (Chinese: 費長房; pinyin: Fèi Chángfáng; fl. 562–598) was a Chinese Buddhist monk, biographer, and bibliographer, from Chengdu. He began as a scholar of the Chinese classics of Confucianism and Daoism, but was converted to Buddhism and became involved in translation work with various Indian monks at the Daxingshan Temple.

He is known for his catalogue of Buddhist texts Records of the Three Treasuries Throughout Successive Dynasties (Chinese: 歷代三寳記; T2034), compiled 597 CE, which was influential in the development of the Chinese Buddhist Tripitaka, however he has come to be known for controversially attributing texts to translators without foundation.

== Bibliography ==
- Tokuno, Kyoko. 1990. 'The Evaluation of Indigenous Scriptures in Chinese Buddhist Bibliographical Catalogues' in Chinese Buddhist Apocrypha, edited by Robert E Buswell. University of Hawaii Press, 31–74.
