= Ren Jiyu =

任继愈 (Ren Jiyu)
- Born: April 15, 1916; Pingyuan County, Shandong Province, China
- Died: July 11, 2009 (aged 93); Beijing, China
- Occupation: National Library of China
- Known for: Chinese librarian

Ren Jiyu (Chinese: 任继愈; born April 15, 1916 - died July 11, 2009) in Pingyuan County, Shandong Province was a philosopher, scholar in religious studies, historian, member of the Chinese Communist Party, and honorary director of the National Library of China. He died at 4:30 on July 11, 2009, in Beijing, at the age of 93.

== Main works ==
- Collection of Buddhist Thinking during the Han and Tang Dynasties, 1963
- A History of Chinese Philosophy (ed.), 4 vols., 1963
- A brief History of Chinese Philosophy, 1973
- History of the Development of Chinese Philosophy, 1983
- Chinese Daoist Philosophers, 1990
- Mozi and Mohist, 1994, reprinted 2009
