= Self-cultivation =

Development of one's virtues

Self-cultivation or personal cultivation (Chinese: 修身; pinyin: xiūshēn; Wade–Giles: hsiu-shen; lit. 'cultivate oneself') is the development of one's mind or capacities through one's own efforts. Self-cultivation is the cultivation, integration, and coordination of mind and body. Although self-cultivation may be practiced and implemented as a form of cognitive therapy in psychotherapy, it goes beyond healing and self-help to also encompass self-development, self-improvement and self-realisation. It is associated with attempts to go beyond and understand normal states of being, enhancing and polishing one's capacities and developing or uncovering innate human potential.

Self-cultivation also alludes to philosophical models in Mohism, Confucianism, Taoism and other Chinese philosophies, also seen in the application of Ancient Greek Philosophy. Cultivative practices are an essential component of well-established East-Asian moral and ethical values. Although this term applies to cultural traditions in Confucianism and Taoism, the goals and aspirations of self-cultivation in these traditions differ greatly.

== Theoretical background ==
=== Purposes and applications ===
Self-cultivation is an essential component of the context of existential relations. It enhances individuality and personal growth and centralises the idea of human agency. Self-cultivation is a process that cultivates one's mind and body in an attempt to transcend ordinary habitual states of being, enhancing a person's coordination and integration of congruent thoughts, beliefs and actions. It aims to polish or enlighten their capacities and inborn potentials.

=== Self-cultivation: cultural and philosophical psychotherapies ===
Confucianism, Taoism, and Buddhism have adopted elements of doctrine from one another to form new branches and sects. Some of these have disseminated to East Asian regions including Taiwan, Japan, and Korea.

==== Confucianism and the relational self ====
Confucius believed that one's life is the continuation of one's parents' life. Therefore, followers of Confucianism teach their children in such way that the younger generation is educated to cultivate themselves to live with a satisfactory level of self-discipline. Even though individuals see a clear-cut boundary between themselves and others, each person in a dyadic relationship is seen embedded in a particular social network. By respecting the parents—the elder and the superior—a child is raised to be morally upright according to the expectations of others. This can be a social burden that causes stressful interpersonal relationships, and can cause disturbance and conflicts.

==== Taoism and the authentic self ====
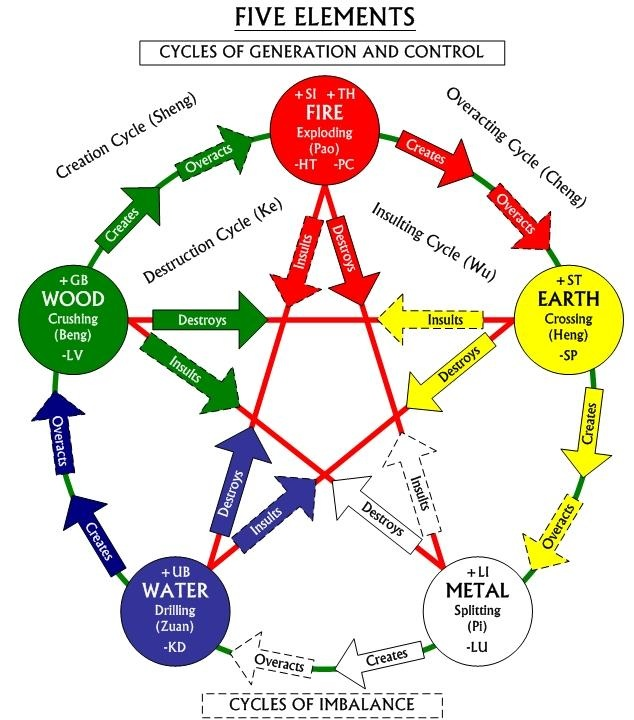
Chinese Philosophy – Five Elements (Cycle of Balance and Control)

Taoism tends to focus on linking the body and mind to the Nature. Taoism advocates the authentic self that is free from legal, social, or political restrictions. It seeks to cultivate an individual's self by healing and emancipating them from the ethical bounds of the human society. Taoism interprets the fortune or misfortune in one's life in terms of one's destiny (命), which is determined by the person's birth date and time. By avoiding the interference of personal desires and by relating everything to the system of the opposing elements of yin and yang, the cosmology of Taoism aims to keep individuals and everything in the harmonious balance. The explanation of self-cultivation in Taoism also corresponds to the equilibrium of the Five Transformative Phases (五行 Wu Xing): metal (金), wood (木), water (水), fire (火), and earth (土).

==== Buddhism and the non-self ====
After the introduction of Buddhism to China, "spiritual self-cultivation" (精神修养) became one of the terms used to translate the Buddhist concept of bhāvana. The ultimate life goal in Buddhism is nirvana. People are encouraged to practice self-cultivation by detaching themselves from their desires and egos, and by attaining a mindful awareness of the non-self.

Chán and Zen Buddhist scholars emphasise that the key in self-cultivation is a "beginner's mind" which can allow the uncovering of the "luminous mind" and the realisation of innate Buddha-nature through the experience of sudden enlightenment.

In Japan, the Buddhist practice is equated with the notion of shūyō (修養 しゅうよう) or personal cultivation.

== Influences of self-cultivation on Chinese philosophy ==
=== Confucian self-cultivation as a psychological process ===
Self-cultivation (修养 xiū yǎng) in the Confucian tradition refers to keeping the balance between inner and outer selves, and between self and others. Self-cultivation in Chinese is an abbreviation of "xiū-xīn yǎng-xìng" (修心养性), which literally translates to "rectifying one’s mind and nurturing one’s character (in particular through art, music and philosophy)".

Confucianism embodies metaphysics of self. It develops a complex model of self-cultivation. The cohering key concept is 'intellectual intuition', which is explained as a direct insight and cognition of present knowledge of reality, with no inference of bias toward discernment or logical reasoning. Confucianism has a large emphasis as its foundation the incorporation, application and implementation of filial piety.

Self-cultivation aims to achieve a harmonious society that is dependent on personal noble cultivation. The process entails the pursuit of moral perfection through knowledge and application.

==== Jūnzǐ ====
In the Analects of Confucius there are two types of persons. One is the "profound person" (君子; jūnzǐ), and the other is "petty person" (小人; xiǎorén). These two types are opposed to one another in terms of developed potential. Confucius takes something of a blank slate perspective: "all human beings are alike at birth" (Analects 17.2), but eventually "the profound person understands what is moral. The petty person understands what is profitable" (4.16).

The jūnzǐ is the person who always manifests the quality of rén (仁; "humaneness", "co-humanity" in an interdependent, hierarchical universe") in themselves and they display the quality of yì ("rightness", "righteousness") in their actions (4.5). Confucius highlights his fundamentally elitist, hierarchical model of relations by describing how the jūnzǐ relates to their fellows:

"The moral force of the jūnzǐ is like the wind, whereas the xiǎorén's is like the grass. The grass shall bend when the wind is let to blow over it."

— Analects, 12.32

According to D. C. Lau, yì is an attribute of actions, and rén is an attribute of agents. There are conceptual links between yì, lǐ ("ritual propriety"), dé ("virtue"), and the jūnzǐ. According to what is yì, the jūnzǐ exerts the moral force, which is dé, and thus demonstrates rén.

The following passages from the Analects point out the pathway towards self-cultivation that Confucius taught, with the ultimate goal of becoming the jūnzǐ:

"The Master's Way is nothing but other-regard and self-reflection."

— Analects, 4.15

"From the age of fifteen on, I have been intent upon learning; from thirty on, I have established myself; from forty on, I have not been confused; from fifty on, I have known the mandate of Heaven; from sixty on, my ear has been attuned; from seventy on, I have followed my heart's desire without transgressing what is right."

— Analects, 2.4

In the first passage, "self-reflection" is explained as "Do not do to others what you do not desire for yourself" (15.24). Confucius considers it extremely important for one to realise the necessity of concern and empathy for others, which can be achieved by reflecting upon oneself. The deeply relational self can then respond to inner reflection with outer virtue.

The second passage indicates the life-long timescale of the process of self-cultivation. It can begin during one's early teenage years, then extend well into more-mature age. The process includes the transformation of the individual, in which they realise that they should be able to distinguish and choose from what is right and what is desired.

Self-cultivation, Confucius expects, is an essential philosophical process for one to become jūnzǐ by maximising rén. He aims to reflect upon a self that is able to compare itself with moral and social principles of tradition. Confucius does not suffer from the Cartesian "mind-body problem". In Confucianism, there is no division between inner and outer self, thus the cumulative effect brought by Confucian self-cultivation is not just limited to one's self or person, but extends rather to the social and even cosmic.

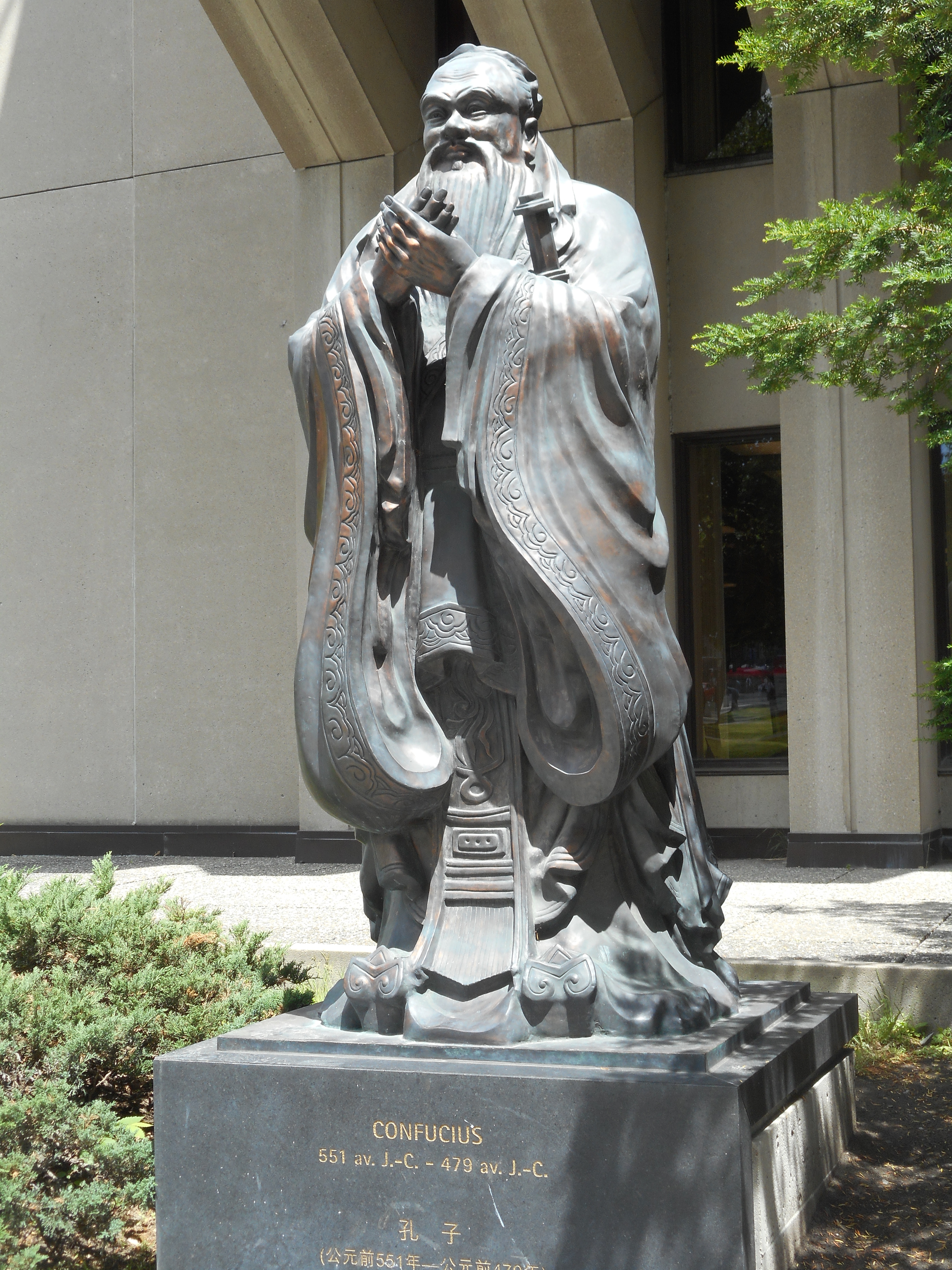
Monument of Confucius

=== Cultural and Ethical Values involved ===
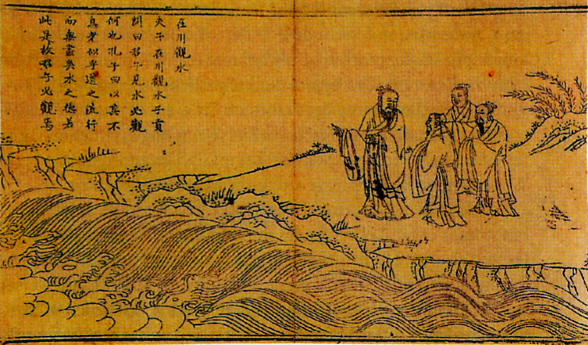
Confucius and Students

Self-cultivation is one of the key principles of Confucianism, and may be considered the core of Chinese philosophy. The latter can be seen as the disciplined reflections on the insights of self-cultivation. While Étienne Balazs asserted that all Chinese philosophy is social philosophy and that the idea of the group takes precedence over conceptions of the individual self as the social dimension of the human condition features so prominently in the Chinese world of thought, Wing-Tsit Chan suggests a more comprehensive characterisation of Chinese philosophy as humanism: not the humanism that denies or slights a Supreme Power, but one that professes the unity of man and Heaven.

Similar to the Western sense of guilt, the Chinese sense of shame is studied to amplify that social approval and other external factors, such as the impression from others, defines the fundamental morals the Chinese society holds, rather than internal psychological sanction. In Chinese ethics, the prevalent sociological literature on the mechanisms of "saving face" (面子, miànzǐ) and "networking" (关系, guānxì) exhibits the importance of Chinese interpersonal and social relationships via the understanding of self-cultivation.

=== Cultivation of self in East Asian philosophy of education ===
In East Asian cultures, self-cultivation is one of the most important concerns in regards to personal growth. To help students and the younger generation understand the meaning of being a person, philosophers (mostly scholars) tried to explain their definitions of self with various theoretical approaches.

The legacy of Chinese philosopher Confucius, among others (for example, Laozi, Zhuangzi, and Mencius), has provided a rich domain of Chinese philosophical heritage in East Asia. Firstly, the goal of education, and one's most noble goal in life, is to properly develop oneself in order to become a "profound person" (君子, jūnzǐ). Young people were taught that it was shameful to become a "petty person" (小人, xiǎo rén), as that was the exact opposite to "sage" (圣人, shèngrén). However, as both Confucian and Daoist philosophers adopted the term shèngrén, there has been divergence that led to differences in educational concepts and practices. Besides Confucianism and Daoism, the Hundred Schools of Thought in Ancient China also included Buddhist and other varieties of philosophy, each of which offered different thoughts on the ideal conception of self.

In the modern era, some East Asian cultures have abandoned some of the archaic conceptions, or have replaced traditional humanistic education with a more common modern approach of self-cultivation that adapts the influences of globalisation. Nevertheless, the East Asian descendants and followers of Confucius still consider an ideal human being essential for their life-time education, with their cultural heritage deeply influenced by radical Confucian values.

== Modern practices ==
=== The "self"-concept in Western culture ===
The "self" concept in western psychology originated from views of a number of empiricists and rationalists. Hegel (1770–1831) established a view of self-consciousness in which, by observation, our subject-object consciousness stimulates our rationale and reasoning, which then guides human behaviour. Freud (1856–1939) developed a three-part model of the psyche comprising the Id (Das Es), the Ego (Das Ich), and the superego (Das Über-Ich). Freud's self-concept influenced Erikson (1902–1994), who emphasized self-identity crisis and self-development. Following Erikson, J. Marcia described the continuum of identity development and the nature of our self-identity.

The concept of self-consciousness derives from self-esteem, self-regulation, and self-efficacy. The subject's concept of "self" is defined in how the individual perceives and builds the link between their self and the world around them.

=== Morita therapy ===
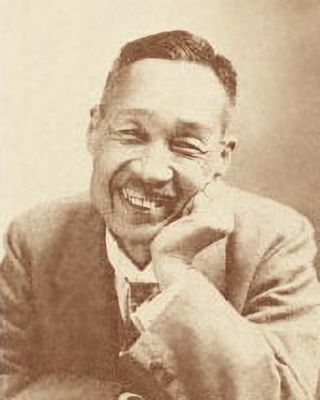
Morita Masatake (1874–1938) a.k.a. Morita Shoma (森田 正馬)

Through case-based research, Japanese psychologist Morita Masatake (1874–1938) introduced Morita therapy. It is based on Masatake's theory of consciousness and his four-stage therapeutic method, and is described as an ecological therapy method that focuses on purpose through individuals' responses. Morita therapy resembles rational-emotive therapy by American psychologist Albert Ellis, and existential and cognitive behavioral therapy.

=== Naikan therapy ===
Naikan ("内観", lit. 'looking inside', self-reflection) is a Japanese psychotherapeutic method introduced and developed decades ago by Japanese businessman and Buddhist monk (Jōdo Shinshū) Yoshimoto Ishin (1916–1988).

Initially, naikan therapy was more often used in correctional settings, however it has been adapted to situational and psychoneurotic disorders.

Similar to Morita therapy, naikan requires subordination to a carefully structured period of "retreat" that is compassionately supervised by the practitioner. Contrary to Morita, naikan is shorter (seven days) and utilizes long, regulated periods of daily meditation in which introspection is directed toward the resolution of contemporary conflicts and problems.

"In contrast to Western psychoanalytic psychotherapy, both naikan and Morita tend to keep transference issues simplified and positive, while resistance is dealt with procedurally rather than interpretively."

=== The theory of constructive living ===
Based largely on the adaptions of two Japanese structured methods of self-reflection, Naikan therapy and Morita therapy, constructive living is a Western approach to mental health education. Purpose-centered and response-oriented, constructive living (sometimes abbreviated as CL) focuses on the mindfulness and purposes of one's life. It is considered as a process of action to approach the reality thoughtfully. It also emphasizes the ability to understand one's self by recognizing the past, in which it reflects upon the present. Constructive Living highlights the importance of acceptance, of the world we live in, as well as the emotions and feelings individuals have in unique situations.

D. Reynolds, Author of Constructive Living and Director of the Constructive Living Center in Oregon, U.S., argues that before taking the actions which may potentially bring positive changes, people are often hold back by the belief of "dealing with negative emotions first". According to Reynolds, the most crucial component of the process of effectuating affirmations is not getting the mind right. However, one's mind and emotions are effectively adjusted during the process of self-reflection, which indicates that there shall be a behavioural change taken place beforehand.

=== Epicurean meleta ===
At the closing of his Letter to Menoeceus, Epicurus instructs his disciple to practice (meleta) "both by yourself and with others of like mind". The first field of practice shares semantic roots with and is related to the Hellenistic philosophical concept of "epimeleia heauton" (self-care), which involves methods of self-cultivation. In addition to the study of philosophy, this may include other techniques for living (techne biou) or technologies of the soul, like the visualizing technique known as "placing before the eyes", a cognitive therapy technique known as "relabeling", moral portraiture, and other didactic and ethical methods. We find examples of these techniques in Philodemus of Gadara, the poet Lucretius, and other Epicurean guides.

=== Nietzsche's ethics of self-cultivation ===
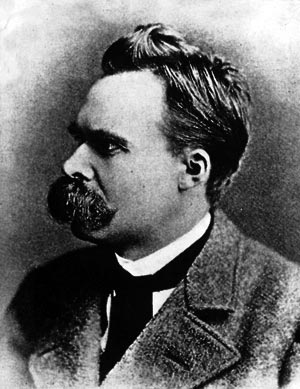
F. Nietzsche (1844–1900)

"If you incorporate this thought within you, amongst your other thoughts" he maintains "It will transform you. If for everything you wish to do you begin by asking yourself: 'Am I certain I want to do this an infinite number of times?' this will become for you the greatest weight." (KSA 9:11 [143]) Nietzsche worked on the project of reviving Self-cultivation, an ancient ethics. "I hate everything that merely instructs me without augmenting or directly invigorating my own activity"(HL 2:1) "It follows therefore that he must conceive eternal recurrence among other things as a practice that stimulates self-cultivation. In fact in one of his characteristically grandiose moments he identified it as 'the great cultivating thought' in the sense that it might weed out those too weak to bear the thought of living again (WP 1053). In a more tempered fashion, however, he framed the thought of recurrence as part of an ethics of self-cultivation and self-transformation."

== See also ==
- Self
- Neo-Confucianism
- Eastern philosophy

== Bibliography ==
- Wu, Meiyao (24 January 2017). "The Process of Self-Cultivation and the Mandala Model of the Self". Frontiers in Psychology. 8: 24. doi:10.3389/fpsyg.2017.00024. PMC 5259693. PMID 28174544.
- Confucian Self-Cultivation and Daoist Personhood, H.Wang
- Choukroune, Leïla; Garapon, Antoine (15 September 2007). "The norms of Chinese harmony Disciplinary rules as social stabiliser A harmonious society is one in which the rule of law is given greater strength and authority". China Perspectives. 2007 (3). doi:10.4000/chinaperspectives.2013.
- Dutournier, Guillaume; Ji, Zhe (31 December 2009). "Social experimentation and 'popular Confucianism'". China Perspectives. 2009 (4). doi:10.4000/chinaperspectives.4925.
- Gramsci, A. (1992). Prison notebooks, Vol. 2. New York, NY: Columbia University Press. [Google Scholar]
- Heidegger, M. (1969). Identity and difference (J. Stambaugh, Trans. with an introduction.). New York, NY: Harper & Row Publishers. [Google Scholar]
- Heidegger, M. (1977). The question concerning technology and other essays ( W. Lovitt, Trans. with an introduction.). New York: Harper Torchbooks. [Google Scholar]
- Heidegger, M. (1978). Letter on humanism. In D. F. Krell (Ed.), Basic writings (2nd ed., pp. 213–265). London: Routledge. [Google Scholar]
- Huang, C. -C. (2010). Humanism in East Asian Confucian Contexts. Bielefeld: Transcript Verlag.[Crossref], [Google Scholar]
- Legge, J. (Trans.). (1861). Confucian analects. The Chinese classics, volume 1. (D. Sturgeon, Ed.). Chinese Text Project. Retrieved 21 March 2017, from http://ctext.org/analects [Google Scholar]
- Wittgenstein, L. (1997). Philosophical investigations (2nd ed.). (G. E. M. Anscombe, Trans.). Malden, MA: Blackwell. [Google Scholar]
- Wittgenstein, L. (2001). Tractatus Logico-philosophicus (D. F. Pears & B. F. McGuinness, Trans.). New York, NY: Routledge. [Google Scholar]
- Yu, K. P. (2013). The hows and whys of the classics of filial piety孝經的道與理 (Xiaojing de dao yu li). Hong Kong: InfoLink. [Google Scholar]
