= Shōma =

- Gender: Male

Origin
- Origin: Japanese
- Meaning: Different meanings depending on the kanji used

Shōma, Shoma or Shouma (written: 翔馬, 翔雅, 匠馬, 正馬, 昌磨 or 聖真) is a masculine Japanese given name. Notable people with the name include:

- Shoma Doi (土居 聖真; born 1992), Japanese footballer
- Shoma Kamata (鎌田 翔雅; born 1989), Japanese footballer
- Shoma Mizunaga (水永 翔馬; born 1985), Japanese footballer
- Shoma Morita (森田 正馬; 1874–1938), Japanese psychologist
- Shoma Uno (宇野 昌磨; born 1997), Japanese figure skater
- Shouma Yamamoto (山本 匠馬; born 1983), Japanese actor

Fictional Characters

- Shoma Enda from the game AI: The Somnium Files - Nirvana Initiative
- Shoma Stomach (also known as Shoma Inoue) from the Tokusatsu series Kamen Rider Gavv
- Shouma Ginzaki from the game The Hundred Line: Last Defense Academy
