= Āgama Section =

Division of the Taishō Tripiṭaka

The Āgama Section (pinyin: Āhán Bù; Japanese: Agon Bu) is a major division of the Taishō Tripiṭaka, the standard edition of the Chinese Buddhist canon. It preserves some of the earliest Buddhist teachings, including sūtras (discourses) that purport to record the words and dialogues of the Buddha and his disciples. These texts are related to the Āgamas and correspond broadly to the Sutta Piṭaka of the Pāli Canon, the primary scriptural collection of Theravāda Buddhism.

The Āgama Section represents the Chinese Buddhist tradition’s transmission of early Buddhist scripture, translated primarily from Sanskrit and other Indian languages between the 2nd and 7th centuries CE. It comprises the first two volumes of the Taishō Tripiṭaka and includes text numbers 1–151.

Major collections in this section include the Dīrghāgama (長阿含經; T1, "Long Discourses"), Madhyamāgama (中阿含經; T26, "Middle-Length Discourses"), Saṃyuktāgama (雜阿含經; T99, "Connected Discourses"), and the Ekottarikāgama (增壹阿含經; T125, "Numerical Discourses"). It also contains individually translated sūtras outside these collections, such as the Dharmacakrapravartana Sūtra (佛說轉法輪經; T109), which recounts the Buddha’s first teaching following his enlightenment.

== Contents ==
Category	Taishō No. (Koryeo No.)	Chinese title (Pinyin; Japanese)	Sanskrit Title (English Title)	Chinese Translation	English Translations	Description and Parallels	
Volume 1
Dīrghāgama	T1 (K647)	長阿含經 (Cháng Āhán Jīng; Jō Agon Kyō)	Dīrghāgama (Longer Āgama Collection)	Translated by Zhu Fonian based on a text read out by Buddhayaśas in 412-413 CE. 22 fascicles, 4 vargas, 30 sūtras.	Shohei Ichimura, The Canonical book of the Buddha's Lengthy Discourses and Charles Patton as The Long Discourses.	A collection of 30 longer sūtras in four sections. Roughly parallel to the Pāli Dīgha Nikāya. This recension belongs to the Dharmaguptaka School.	
Dīrghāgama	T2 (K1182)	七佛經 (Qīfó Jīng; Shichibutsu Kyō)	Saptabuddhaka (Seven Buddhas Sūtra)	Translated by Fatian in 973 CE. 1 fascicle.	No English translations.	A narrative relating the biographies of seven past buddhas. One of several translations with genetic relation to the Mahāvadāna-sūtra (T1(1); 大本經), correlating to the Pāli Mahāpadāna-suttanta (DN14). Besides T1(1) parallels found in T3, T4, and T136).	
Dīrghāgama	T3 (K1177)	毘婆尸佛經 (Pípóshīfó Jīng; Bibashibutsu Kyō)	*Vipaśyinbuddha-sūtra (Vipaśyin Buddha Sūtra)	Translated by Fatian in 973 CE. 2 fascicles.	No English translations.	A narrative relating the biography of Vipaśyin Buddha, with some overlaps with Fatian's translation of T2, and thus also the Mahāvadāna-sūtra (T1(1)). Besides T2, partial parallels are also found in T4 and T125(19.1).	
Dīrghāgama	T4 (K747)	七佛父母姓字經 (Qīfó Fùmǔ Xìngzì Jīng; Shichibutsu Fumo Shōji Kyō)	*Saptabuddha-pitṛmātṛ-gotranāma-sūtra (Sūtra on the Parents and Clan Names of the Seven Buddhas)	Translator unknown. Dates to the Cao Wei Dynasty (220-254 CE). 1 fascicle.	No English translations.	A simplified variant on the Mahāvadāna-sūtra (T1(1)) narrative, where the Buddha relates the biographical details of seven past buddhas. Besides T1(1), parallels are also found in T2, T3, and T125(48.4).	
Dīrghāgama	T5 (K653)	佛般泥洹經 (Fó Bānníhuán Jīng; Butsu Hannion Kyō)	*Buddha-nirvāṇa-sūtra (Sūtra on the Buddha's Nirvāṇa)	Translated by Bo Fazu in the Western Jin Dynasty's Huidi era (290-306 CE). 2 fascicles.	No English translations.	A rendition of the narrative leading up to the Buddha's parinirvāṇa in Kuśinagara. One of several sūtras of genetic relation to the Journey Sūtra (T1(2); 遊行經) correlating to the Pāli Mahāparinibbāna-suttanta (DN16). Besides T1(2), parallels are also found in T6, T7, T26(68 & 142), and T125(40.2).	
Dīrghāgama	T6 (K654)	般泥洹經 (Bānníhuán Jīng; Hannion Kyō)	Nirvāṇa-sūtra	Translator unknown. Dates to the Eastern Jin Dynasty (317–420). 2 fascicles.	No English translations.	Similar to T5, this is a rendition of the narrative leading up to the Buddha's parnirvāṇa starting from his departure from Rājagṛha, with emphasis the distribution of his relics and worship of stūpas. Ui suggests Dharmarakṣa (c. 239–316) as the possible translator. Besides T5, parallels include T1(2), T7, T26(68 & 142), and T125(40.2).	
Dīrghāgama	T7 (K652)	大般槃經經 (Dà Bānnièpán Jīng; Dai Hannehan Gyō)	Mahāparinirvāṇa-sūtra (Sūtra on the Great Final Nirvāṇa)	Translated by Faxian in 416–418. 3 fascicles.	No English translations.	Similar to T5 and T6, this sūtra is a rendition of the narrative of the Buddha's nirvāṇa, from his announcement that he will enter nirvāṇa up to the division of his relics. Parallels are T1(2), T5, T6, and T26(68).	
Dīrghāgama	T8 (K1453)	大堅固婆羅門緣起經 (Dà Jiān'gù Póluómén Yuánqǐ Jīng; Dai Kengo Baramon Engi Kyō)	*Mahā-dṛḍha-brāhmaṇa-nidāna-sūtra (Sūtra of the Great Reliable Brahmin) Lancaster suggests Mahāgovindiya-sūtra.	Translated by Dānapāla in 1010. 2 fascicles.	No English translations.	A past-life story of the Buddha's time as the Great Reliable Brahmin, in which he guides a king. Roughly equivalent to the Pāli Mahāgovinda-sutta (DN19). Parallel to the Dīrghāgama's Govinda-sūtra T1(3).	
Dīrghāgama	T9 (K1247)	人仙經 (Rénxiān Jīng; Ninsen Kyō)	*Ṛṣi-jina-sūtra (The Seer Sage Sūtra)	Translated by Tainxizai in 1001. 1 fascicle.	No English translations.	Some time before his nirvāṇa, the Buddha delivers this sūtra on King Bimbisāra's rebirth as Ṛṣi Jina in the heaven of Vaiśravaṇa. Equivalent to the Pāli Janavasabha-sutta (DN18). Parallel to the Dīrghāgama's Janavṛṣabha-sūtra T1(4).	
Dīrghāgama	T10 (K1464)	白衣金幢二婆羅門緣起經 (Báiyī Jīnchuáng Ér Póluómén Yuánqǐ Jīng; Byakue Kondō Ni Baramon Engi Kyō)	*Dvibrāhmaṇa-vāsiṣṭha-bhāradvāja-prat-sūtra (The Sūtra on Origination for the Two Brahmins, Vāsiṣṭha and Bhāradvāja)	Translated by Dānapāla in 1012. 3 fascicles.	No English translations.	The Buddha explains to two brahmins about how caste is irrelevant to being a true brahmin. This sūtra is equivalent to the Pāli Aggañña-sutta (DN27). It's parallels include the Dīrghāgama's Lesser Sūtra on Conditions (T1(5); 小緣經) and the Madhyamāgama's Bhāradvāja-sūtra (T26(154); 婆羅婆堂經).	
Dīrghāgama	T11 (K1463)	尼拘陀梵志經 (Níjūtuó Fànzhì Jīng; Nikuda Bonshi Kyō)	*Nyagrodha-brāhmaṇa-sūtra (The Sūtra on the Brahmin Nyagrodha)	Translated by Dānapāla in 980. 2 fascicles.	No English translations.	The Buddha explains to Nyagrodha about the disadvantages of asceticism and how to practise the Buddha-Dharma. Equivalent to the Pāli Udumbarika-sīhanāda-sutta (D23). Parallels include the Dīrghāgama's Sandānikā Sūtra (T1(8); 散陀那經), and the Madhyamāgama's Udambara Sūtra (T26(104); 優曇婆邏經).	
Dīrghāgama	T12 (K1429)	大集法門經 (Dàjí Fǎmén Jīng; Daishū Hōmon Kyō)	Mahāsaṅgīti-sūtra(The Sūtra on the Great Assembly)	Translated by Dānapāla in 980. 2 fascicles.	No English translations.	During a full moon day, the Buddha teaches the Saṅgha near Pāvā but retires due to a backache. Śāriputra takes over and recites a comprehensive collection of the Buddha's teachings. Equivalent to the Pāli Saṅgītisutta (DN33). Parallel to the Dīrghāgama's Saṅgīti-sūtra (T1(9); 衆集經).	
Dīrghāgama	T13 (K663)	長阿含十報法經 (Cháng Āhánshíbàofǎ Jīng; Jō Agon Juppō Hōkyō)	*Dīrghāgama-daśavipāka-dharma-sūtra(The Dīrghāgama Sūtra on the Ten Retributive Dharmas)	Translated by An Shigao between 148 and 170 CE. 2 fascicles.	No English translations.	The Buddha analyses the Dharma into ten aspects: attaining, cultivation, awakening, cessation, retrogression, increase, the difficult to understand, arising, knowledge, and realisation. This early sūtra is thought to record an early phase in the development of the Āgama literature. Equivalent to the Pāli Dasuttarasutta (DN34) and the Dīrghāgama's Daśottara-sūtra (T1(10); 十上經).	
Dīrghāgama	T14 (K655)	人本欲生經 (Rén Běnyùshēng Jīng; Nin Honyokushō Kyō)	Mahānidāna-sūtra (The Sūtra on the Great Origin; The Sūtra on the Origin of Humans into Desire)	Translated by An Shigao between 146 and 156 CE. 1 fascicle.	No English translations.	The Buddha teaches on dependent origination, starting with old age and death, birth, becoming, attachment, and desire. Equivalent to the Pāli Mahānidāna-suttanta (DN15). Parallel to the Dīrghāgama's Mahānidāna-sūtra (T1(13); 大緣方便經), the Madhyamāgama's Mahānidāna-sūtra (T26(79); 大因經), and T52.	
Dīrghāgama	T15 (K1252)	帝釋所問經 (Dìshì Suǒwèn Jīng; Taishaku Shomon Kyō)	Śakra-paripṛcchā-sūtra (The Sūtra on the Questions of Śakra)	Translated by Faxian (the latter) between 998 and 1001. 1 fascicle.	No English translations.	Śakra is taught by the Buddha that suffering arises from ignorance, and that release comes through the eightfold path. It includes discussion of how women can abandon their female form and be born as devas. Equivalent to the Pāli Sakkapañha-sutta (DN21). Parallel to the Dīrghāgama's Śakrodevendra-paripṛcchā-sūtra (T1(14); 釋提桓因問經), the Madhyamāgama's Śakra-paripṛcchā-sūtra (T26(134); 釋問經) and the Saṃyukta-ratna-piṭaka-sūtra's Śakra-paripṛcchāvadāna (T203(6); 帝釋問事緣).	
Dīrghāgama	T16 (K656)	佛說尸迦羅越六方禮經 (Shījiāluóyuè Liùfānglǐ Jīng; Shigaraotsu Roppōrai Kyō)	Śṛgālāvāda-sūtra (The Words for Śṛgālā Sūtra)	Translated by An Shigao between 148 and 170. 1 fascicle.	Bhadanta Pannasiri, "Sigālovāda-Sutta," Visva-Bharati Annals 3 (1950): 150-228 (from p. 165).	Śṛgālā (a.k.a. Sujāta or Sujātaputra) bows to the six directions wishing to avoid misfortune. The Buddha suggests that instead he should pay respect to six kinds of people on whom one relies, e.g. parents, teachers, etc. Equivalent to the Pāli Sigālovāda Sutta (DN31). Parallel to the Dīrghāgama's Sujāta-sūtra (T1(16); 善生經), the Madhyamāgama's Sujāta-sūtra (T26(135); 善生經), and the Sujātaputra-sūtra (T17; 善生子經).	
Dīrghāgama	T17 (K718)	善生子經 (Shànshēngzǐ Jīng; Zenshōshi Kyō)	Sujātapura-sūtra (The Sūtra of Sujāta's Son)	Translated by Zhi Fadu in 301. 1 fascicle.	Bhadanta Pannasiri, "Sigālovāda-Sutta," Visva-Bharati Annals 3 (1950): 150-228 (from p. 173).	A retranslation of T16. Equivalent to the Pāli Sigālovāda Sutta (DN31). Parallel to the Dīrghāgama's Sujāta-sūtra (T1(16); 善生經), the Madhyamāgama's Sujāta-sūtra (T26(135); 善生經), and the Śṛgālāvāda-sūtra (T16; 佛說尸迦羅越六方禮經).	
Dīrghāgama	T18 (K1248)	信佛功德經 (Xìnfó Gōngdé Jīng; Shinbutsu Kudoku Kyō)	Sūtra of Faith in the Buddha's Merits	Translated by Faxian (the latter) in 1001. 1 fascicle.	No English translation.	Śāriputra speaks of his great faith in the Buddha. While admitting his ignorance of the merits of all buddhas of the three times, Śāriputra praises their merits in terms of morality and liberation. Equivalent to the Pāli Sampasādanīya Sutta (DN28). Parallel to the Dīrghāgama's Personal Gladness Sūtra (T1(18); 自歡喜經).	
Dīrghāgama	T19 (K1179)	大三摩惹經 (Dà Sānmórě Jīng; Dai Sanmanya Kyō)	Mahāsamāja Sūtra (The Great Assembly Sūtra)	Translated by Fatian in 973. 1 fascicle.	No English translation.	A large assembly of devas come to hear the Buddha teach and see the saṅgha. Parts equivalent to the Pāli Mahasamaya Sutta (DN20) and Āṭānāṭiya Sutta (DN32). Parallel to the Dīrghāgama's Mahāsamāja Sūtra(T1(19)); 大會經), the Saṃyuktāgama's "Assembly" (T99(44.15); 集曾), and the Alternative Saṃyuktāgama's sutta 5.22.	
Dīrghāgama	T20 (K657)	佛開解梵志阿颰經 (Fó Kāijiě Fànzhìābá Jīng; Butsu Kaige Bonshi Abatsu Kyō)	(The Sūtra of the Buddha's Awakening of Ambāṣṭha)	Translated by Zhi Qian between 223 and 253. 1 fascicle.	No English translation.	The Buddha teaches the proud brahmin Ambāṣṭha, that while the kṣatriyas are really superior to brahmins, true nobility stems from morality, meditation, and wisdom. Equivalent to the Pāli Ambaṭṭha Sutta (DN3). Parallel to the Dīrghāgama's Ambāṣṭha Sūtra (T1(20); 波羅牢經).	
Dīrghāgama	T21 (K659)	梵網六十二見經 (Fànwǎng Liùshíèr Jiàn Jīng; Bonmō Rokujūni Ken Kyō)	(The Brahma Net of Sixty-two Views Sūtra)	Translated by Zhi Qian between 223 and 253. 1 fascicle.	No English translation.	Two ascetics disagree about the virtue or vice of the Buddha. The Buddha explains the benefit of not being moved by praise or blame for them, with a lengthy discussion on the 62 wrong views. Equivalent to the Pāli Brahmajāla Sutta (DN1). Parallel to the Dīrghāgama's Brahmā's Shaking Sūtra (T1(21); 梵動經).	
Dīrghāgama	T22 (K658)	寂志果經 (Jìzhìguǒ Jīng; Jakushika Kyō)	Śrāmaṇyaphala Sūtra (The Fruits of the Contemplative Life)	Translated by Dharmarakṣa (the latter) between 381 and 395. 1 fascicle.	Gaeme MacQueen, A Study of the Śrāmaṇyaphala-sūtra.	On the occasion of Ajātaśatru's remorse over his patricide, the Buddha teaches him about the benefits of monastic life, and Ajātaśatru becomes a supporter of the Saṅgha. Equivalent to the Pāli Sāmaññaphala Sutta (DN2). Parallel to the Dīrghāgama's Śrāmaṇyaphala Sūtra (T1(27); 沙門果經), the Ekottarāgama's "Rootless Faith" (T125(43.7); 無根信), with some parallels in The Sūtra on the Eight States of a Horse as a Parable for People (T115; 馬有八態譬人經).	
Dīrghāgama	T23 (K662)	大樓炭經 (Dàlóutàn Jīng; Dairōtan Kyō)	(Sūtra of the Great Creation and Destruction)	Translated by Fali and Faju between 290 and 307. 6 fascicles.	No English translation.	A sūtra on Buddhist cosmology, detailing the world's creation and destruction. It has no Pāli equivalent. Parallel to parts of the Dīrghāgama's Description of the World Sūtra (T1(30); 世記經) and the Sūtra on the Arising of the World (T24; 起世經) and the Sūtra on the Root Causes of the Arising of the World (T25; 起世因本經).	
Dīrghāgama	T24 (K660)	起世經 (Qǐshì Jīng; Kise Kyō)	(Sūtra on the Arising of the World)	Translated by Jñānagupta between 585 and 600. 10 fascicles.	No English translation	A sūtra on Buddhist cosmology, detailing the world's creation and destruction. It has no Pāli equivalent. Parallel to the Dīrghāgama's Description of the World Sūtra (T1(30); 世記經) and the Sūtra of the Great Creation and Destruction (T23; 大樓炭經) and the Sūtra on the Root Causes of the Arising of the World (T25; 起世因本經).	
Dīrghāgama	T25 (K661)	起世因本經 (Qǐshìyīnběn Jīng; Kiseinpon Gyō)	(Sūtra on the Root Causes of the Arising of the World)	Translated by Dharmagupta between 605 and 617. 10 fascicles.	No English translation.	A sūtra on Buddhist cosmology, detailing the world's creation and destruction. It has no Pāli equivalent. Parallel, with some differences in chapter order, to the Dīrghāgama's Description of the World Sūtra (T1(30); 世記經) and the Sūtra of the Great Creation and Destruction (T23; 大樓炭經) and the Sūtra on the Arising of the World (T24; 起世經).	
Madhyamāgama	T26 (K648)	中阿含經 (Zhōng Āhán Jīng; Chū Agon Kyō)	Madhyamāgama (The Middle Length Āgama Collection)	Translated by Saṅghadeva in 397–398. 60 fascicles, 5 adhyāyas, 18 vargas, 220 sūtras.	Anālayo, R. Bucknell, M. Bingenheimer, et al., The Madhyamāgama (sūtras 1–181). Charles Patton, The Medium Discourses (selected sūtras).	An earlier translation of the Madhyamāgama collection was lost. This surviving one belongs to the Sarvāstivāda school. It is equivalent to the Pāli Majjhima Nikāya, with differences in arrangement and more sūtras in the Chinese, some of which have parallel to the Aṅguttara Nikāya.	
Madhyamāgama	T27 (K665)	七知經 (Qīzhī jīng; Shitchi kyō)	Dhammaññū (Sūtra on the Seven Kinds of Knowledge)	Translated by Zhi Qian between 223–253. 1 fascicle.	No English translation.	A sūtra on attaining awakening based on the Dharma, meaning, timeliness, self-discipline, oneself, and others. Possibly a transmission of the Mahāsāṅghikas. It is equivalent to the Pāli Aṅguttara Nikāya VII.64. It parallels the Madhyamāgama 26(1) and the Ekottarāgama 125(39–1).	
Madhyamāgama	T28 (K1413)	園生樹經 (Yuánshēngshù jīng; Onjōju kyō)	(Sūtra of the Pārijātaka Tree)	Translated by Dānapāla in c. -1017. 1 fascicle.	No English translation.	A sūtra on the leaves of the Pārijātaka tree in the Heaven of the Thirty Three. As they fall, they produce buds, leaves, and fruits. This is a metaphor for a monastic's practice on the path to awakening. It is equivalent to the Pāli Aṅguttaranikāya VII.65 (Pāriccattako). It parallels Madhyamāgama 2 and Ekottarāgma 39(2).	
Madhyamāgama	T29 (K668)	鹹水喻經 (Xiánshuǐyù jīng; Kansuiyu kyō)	(Salt Water Simile Sūtra)	Translator unknown, dated to the Western Jin between 265–317. 1 fascicle.	No English translation.	A sūtra on various similes related to water, which correspond to seven stages of people, starting from those drowning in evil up to those who achieve liberation. Parallels the Madhyamāgama 4 and Ekottarāgma 39(3).	
Madhyamāgama	T30 (K1201)	薩鉢多酥哩踰捺野經 (Sàbōduōsūlīyú'nàyě jīng; Sabbata-soriyunaya kyō)	*Sapta-sūryoda-sūtra (Sūtra on the Seven Suns)	Translated by Faxian/ Dharmabhadra in 991. 1 fascicle.	No English translation.	A sūtra on how, in the final age, there will be seven suns that will appear and burn the earth. After which, the good-eyed Buddha Sunetra (a former birth of Śākyamuni as a Buddha) will be born, teaching the Dharma, allowing beings of that age to attain birth in the Brahmā Heaven without being burnt with the earth. Equivalent to the Pāli Aṅguttaranikāya VII.62 (Suriya). Parallels the Madhyamāgama 8 and Ekottarāgama 40(1).	
Madhyamāgama	T31 (K672)	一切流攝守因經 (Yīqiè liúshè shǒuyīn jīng; Issai rushō shuin kyō)	*Sarvāsravasūtra (Sūtra on the Sustenance and Causes of all the Effluents)	Translated by An Shigao between 148–170. 1 fascicle.	No English translation.	A sūtra on seven ways a bhikṣu can remove the effluents (āsravas). Equivalent to the Pāli Sabbāsavasutta (MN 2). Parallels the Madhyamāgama 26(10) and Ekottarāgama 125(40–6).	
Madhyamāgama	T32 (K673)	四諦經 (Sìdì jīng; Shitai kyō)	Catuḥ-satya-sūtra (Sūtra on the Four Truths)	Translated by An Shigao between 148–170. 1 fascicle.	No English translation.	A sūtra on the Four Noble Truths to the bhikṣus of Jetavana, with particular praise for Śāriputra and Maudgalyāyana. Equivalent to the Pāli Saccavibhaṅgasutta (MN 141). Parallels the Madhyamāgama 31 and Ekottarāgama 27(1).	
Madhyamāgama	T33 (K675)	佛說恒水經 (Héngshuǐ jīng; Gōsui kyō)	(Sūtra on the Ganges)	Translated by Faju between 290–307. 1 fascicle.	No English translation.	A sūtra that uses the analogy of the treasure-filled ocean to illustrate the preciousness of precepts and depth of the Dharma. Equivalent to the Pāli Uposatha (AN 8(20)). Parallels the Madhyamāgama 37 and Ekottarāgama 48(2), and T34 and T35.	
Madhyamāgama	T34 (K783)	法海經 (Fǎhǎi jīng; Hokkai kyō)	(Dharma Ocean Sūtra)	Translated by Faju between 290–307. 1 fascicle.	No English translation.	A sūtra that uses the analogy of the treasure-filled ocean to illustrate the preciousness of precepts and depth of the Dharma. Equivalent to the Pāli Uposatha (AN 8(20)). Parallels the Madhyamāgama 37 and Ekottarāgama 48(2), and T33 and T35.	
Madhyamāgama	T35 (K779)	海八德經 (Hǎibādé jīng; Kaihattoku kyō)	(Sūtra on the Eight Merits of the Ocean)	Attributed to Kumārajīva (c. 402–412). Probably by Zhu Falan in c. 150. 1 fascicle.	No English translation.	A sūtra that uses the analogy of the treasure-filled ocean to illustrate the preciousness of precepts and depth of the Dharma. Equivalent to the Pāli Uposatha (AN 8(20)). Parallels the Madhyamāgama 37 and Ekottarāgama 48(2), and T33 and T34.	
Madhyamāgama	T36 (K674)	本相猗致經 (Běnxiāngyǐzhì jīng; Honsō'ichi kyō)	(The Sūtra on the Fundamental Characteristics of Dependence)	Translated by An Shigao between 148–170. 1 fascicle.	No English translation.	The Buddha teaches that attachment comes from delusion, which is fueled by the five obstructions arising from foolish company, while wise association cultivates the seven factors of enlightenment and leads to liberation. Equivalent to the Pāli Āhāra-sutta (AN 10(61-62)). Parallels the Madhyamāgama 51 and T37.	
Madhyamāgama	T37 (K669)	緣本致經 (Yuánběnzhì jīng; Enhonchi kyō)	(The Sūtra on the Original Conditions)	Translator unknown (c. 317–420). 1 fascicle.	No English translation.	The Buddha teaches that attachment comes from delusion, which is fueled by the five obstructions arising from foolish company, while wise association cultivates the seven factors of enlightenment and leads to liberation. Equivalent to the Pāli Āhāra-sutta (AN 10(61-62)). Parallels the Madhyamāgama 51 and T36.	
Madhyamāgama	T38 (K1422)	輪王七寶經 (Lúnwáng qībǎo jīng; Rinnō shippō kyō)	(The Wheel Turning King and Seven Treasures Sūtra)	Translated by Dānapāla in 980. 1 fascicle.	No English translation.	The sutra shows the cakravartin's seven treasures as symbols of the seven factors of awakening. Equivalent to the Pāli Cakka-vattisutta (SN 46(42)). Parallels the Madhyāmāgama 58, Saṃyuktāgama 721, and Ekottarāgama 39(7).	
Madhyamāgama	T39 (K676)	頂生王故事經 (Dǐngshēngwánggùshì jīng; Chōshōōkoji kyō)	(The Tale of King Mūrdhaja Sūtra)	Translated by Faju between 290–306. 1 fascicle.	No English translation.	The Buddha tells Ānanda about King Mūrdhajāta, who, despite great wealth and power, was never satisfied, became greedy, lost his spiritual powers, and fell into a lower realm as a result. Parallels the Madhyāmāgama 60, and the Sutra of King Mūrdhajāta T40.	
Madhyamāgama	T40 (K681)	文陀竭王經 (Wéntuójiéwáng jīng; Mondakatsuō kyō)	(Sutra of King Mūrdhajāta)	Translated by Dharmakṣema between 414–421. 1 fascicle.	No English translation.	The Buddha tells Ānanda about King Mūrdhajāta, who, despite great wealth and power, was never satisfied, became greedy, lost his spiritual powers, and fell into a lower realm as a result. Parallels the Madhyāmāgama 60, and the Tale of King Mūrdhaja Sūtra T39.	
Madhyamāgama	T41 (K1243)	頻婆娑羅王經 (Pínpósuōluó Wáng jīng; Bimbashara Ō kyō)	Bimbisāra-pratyudgamana-sūtra (The King Bimbisāra Sūtra)	Translated by Tianxizai in c. 1001. 1 fascicle.	No English translation.	The sutra tells of King Bimbisāra visiting the Buddha, who teaches impermanence and non‑self; many, including the king, gain insight and take refuge. Parallels the Madhyāmāgama 62.	
Madhyamāgama	T42 (K684)	鐵城泥犁經 (Tiěchéng nílí jīng; Tetsujō nairi kyō)	(Sutra on the Hell of the Iron City)	Translated by Tan Wulan between 381–395. 1 fascicle.	No English translation.	The Buddha uses his divine eye to see how beings are reborn according to their actions: good conduct leads to fortunate higher realms, while bad conduct leads to lower realms like ghosts, animals, or hells. Equivalent to the Pāli Devadūta-sutta MN 130 and the Devadūta-sutta AN 3(35). Parallels the Madhyāmāgama 64, Yāmaʼs Five Divine Messengers Sūtra T43, and Ekottarāgama 32(4).	
Madhyamāgama	T43 (K682)	閻羅王五天使者經 (Yánluówáng wǔtiānshǐzhě jīng; Enra'ō gotenshisha kyō)	(Yāmaʼs Five Divine Messengers Sūtra)	Translated by Huijian in 457. 1 fascicle.	No English translation.	Yāma, in order to keep people from committing evil, sends five divine messengers—birth, old age, sickness, death, and criminals—to the world. However, sentient beings fail to awaken and persist in their foolish behavior. Equivalent to the Pāli Devadūta-sutta MN 130 and the Devadūta-sutta AN 3(35). Parallels the Madhyāmāgama 64, Sutra on the Hell of the Iron City T42, and Ekottarāgama 32(4).	
Madhyamāgama	T44 (K670)	古來世時經 (Gǔláishìshí jīng; Koraiseji kyō)	(Account of Previous Lifetimes Sūtra)	Translator unknown (c. 317–420). 1 fascicle.	No English translation.	This sūtra has two parts. (1) Aniruddha gains wealth and noble rebirth after offering food to the solitary realizer Heli when he was poor. (2) A prophecy that Maitreya will appear in this world and become the next Buddha. First part parallels the Pāli Theragātha 910–919. Equivalent to the Madhyamāgama 66.	
Madhyamāgama	T45 (K1234)	大正句王經 (Dàzhèngjùwáng jīng; Daiseiku'ō kyō)	(The Great King Pāyāsi Sūtra)	Translated by Faxian between 995-997. 2 fascicles.	No English translation.	A debate between the monk Kumāra-Kāśyapa and King Pāyāsi, who holds a strictly materialist and nihilistic worldview, which is refuted by Kumāra-Kāśyapa through a series of ingenious parables and logical arguments. Parallels the Pāli Pāyāsi-suttanta DN23. Equivalent to the Madhyamāgama 71, and Dīrghāgama 7.	
Madhyamāgama	T46 (K686)	阿那律八念經 (Ānàlǜ bāniàn jīng; Anaritsu hachinen kyō)	(The Eight Mindfulnesses of Anuruddha Sūtra)	Translated by Zhiyao in 185. 1 fascicle.	No English translation.	Teaches the Eight Mindfulnesses of Great Persons, which include (1) few desires, (2) contentment, (3) solitude, (4) diligence, (5) mental regulation, (6) concentration, (7) wisdom, and (8) renunciation of home. It adds that the four dhyānas lead to nirvāṇa. Parallels the Pāli Anuruddha-sutta AN8(30). Equivalent to the Madhyamāgama 74 and the Ekottarāgama 42.	
Madhyamāgama	T47 (K687)	離睡經 (Líshuì jīng; Risui kyō)	(The Sūtra on Avoiding Drowsiness)	Translated by Dharmarakṣa, c. 265–313. 1 fascicle. Considered by scholars to belong to a lost Madhyamāgama, possibly by Dharmanandi and Zhu Fonian.	No English translation.	The Buddha, noticing Maudgalyāyana walking and sleeping, gave him a teaching on how to prevent drowsiness, then broadened the instruction to explain that monks should cultivate pure practices by contemplating that three types of feelings are impermanent and corrupt. Parallels the Pāli AN7(58). Equivalent to the Madhyamāgama 83.	
Madhyamāgama	T48 (K690)	是法非法經 (Shìfǎ fēifǎ jīng; Zehōhihō kyō)	(The Sūtra on the Right Dharma and Wrong Dharma)	Translated by An Shigao, c. 148–170. 1 fascicle.	No English translation.	The Buddha contrasts an untrue man, who is proud of his noble birth, reputation, learning, and asceticism and uses these to belittle others, with a true man, who understands that only following the Dharma matters, honours those who practice it correctly, and neither exalts himself nor disparages others. Parallels the Pāli MN130 Sappurisa-sutta. Equivalent to the Madhyamāgama 85.	
Madhyamāgama	T49 (K677)	求欲經 (Qiúyù jīng; Guyoku kyō)	(The Urgent Desire Sūtra)	Translated by Faju, c. 290–306. 1 fascicle. Considered by scholars to belong to a lost Madhyamāgama, possibly by Dharmanandi and Zhu Fonian.	No English translation.	The Buddha teaches that there are four kinds of people: (1) one who is defiled but unaware of it, (2) one who is defiled but aware of it, (3) one who is undefiled but unaware of it, and (4) one who is undefiled and aware of it. Parallels the Pāli MN5 Anaṅgaṇa-sutta. Equivalent to the Madhyamāgama 87 and Ekottarāgama 25(6).	
Madhyamāgama	T50 (K688)	受歲經 (Shòusuì jīng; Jusai kyō)	(Sūtra on Adding Years)	Translated by Dharmarakṣa, c. 266–313. 1 fascicle. Considered by scholars to belong to a lost Madhyamāgama, possibly by Dharmanandi and Zhu Fonian.	No English translation.	The Buddha observes that he, together with the saṅgha, have added a year to their monastic age. Maudgalyāyana told the bhikṣus that when this happens, they should reflect on their mistakes and accept instruction. Parallels the Pāli MN15 Anumāna-sutta. Equivalent to the Madhyamāgama 89.	
Madhyamāgama	T51 (K671)	梵志計水淨經 (Fànzhì jìshuǐjìng jīng; Bonshi keisuijō kyō)	(The Parivrājaka's Estimation of Water Purification Sūtra)	Translator unknown, c. 317–420. 1 fascicle. Considered by scholars to belong to a lost Madhyamāgama, possibly by Dharmanandi and Zhu Fonian.	No English translation.	The Buddha meets a parivrājaka at the river in Uruvelā who believes water purifies people. The Buddha teaches that true impurity is mental affliction, and that purification comes from abandoning attachments and practising the four immeasurable minds, converting the parivrājaka. Parallels the Pāli MN7 Vatthūpama-sutta. Equivalent to the Madhyamāgama 93, Ekottarāgama 13(5), Saṁyuktāgama T99 44(8), and alternative Saṁyukatāgama T100 5(16).	
Madhyamāgama	T52 (K1410)	大生義經 (Dàshēngyì jīng; Daishōgi kyō)	*Mahānidāna-sūtra (The Great Origin Sūtra)	Translated by Dānapāla, c. 980. 1 fascicle.	No English translation.	The Buddha teaches Ānanda about the twelve links, the seven abodes of consciousness, the two perceptionless heavens, and the eight kinds of liberation. Parallels the Madhyamāgama 97, Dīghāgama 13, T14 人本欲生經, and T124 緣起經.	
Madhyamāgama	T53 (K692)	苦陰經 (Kǔyīn jīng; Kuon kyō)	*Duḥkha-skandha-sūtra (Sūtra on the Aggregate of Suffering)	Translator unknown, c. 220. 1 fascicle. Considered by scholars to belong to a lost Madhyamāgama, possibly by Dharmanandi and Zhu Fonian.	No English translation.	Focuses on the Four Noble Truths. The first, suffering is explained through three areas—sensuality, physical form, and feeling—each examined in terms of what is appealing about it, the dangers it involves, and how one can be freed from it. Parallels the Pāli MN13 Mahādukkha-kkhanda-sutta. Equivalent to the Madhyamāgama 99 and Ekottarāgama 21(9).	
Madhyamāgama	T54 (K691)	釋摩男本四子經 (Shìmónán běn sìzǐ jīng; Shakumanan hon shishi kyō)	(Śākya Mahānāma who has Four Sons Sūtra)	Translated by Zhi Qian, c. 223–253. 1 fascicle.	No English translation.	Mahānāma rejects the teaching that the three poisons cause all problems, and the Buddha responds by recounting with an explanation on how the world offers little happiness. Parallels the Pāli MN14 Cūḷadukkha-kkhanda-sutta. Equivalent to the Madhyamāgama 100, Ekottarāgama 41(1), and T55 苦陰因事經 (which differs in some respects).	
Madhyamāgama	T55 (K678)	苦陰因事經 (Kǔyīn yīnshì jīng; Kuon inji kyō)	(The Causes of the Aggregate of Suffering)	Translated by Faju, c. 290–306. 1 fascicle. Considered by scholars to belong to a lost Madhyamāgama, possibly by Dharmanandi and Zhu Fonian.	No English translation.	Mahānāma complains that he is still defiled, and the Buddha responds by explaining how the five desires cause the aggregate of suffering—so by ending sensuality, one can bring about true happiness. Parallels the Pāli MN14 Cūḷadukkha-kkhanda-sutta. Equivalent to the Madhyamāgama 100, Ekottarāgama 41(1), and T54 釋摩男本四子經 (which differs in some respects).	
Madhyamāgama	T56 (K689)	樂想經 (Yào xiǎng jīng; Gyō sō kyō)	*Sukhasaṃjñā-sūtra (Perception of Pleasure Sūtra)	Translated by Dharmarakṣa, c. 266–313. 1 fascicle. Considered by scholars to belong to a lost Madhyamāgama, possibly by Dharmanandi and Zhu Fonian.	No English translation.	Teaches that taking any dharma—elements, devas, meditative states, or experiences—as “this,” “in this,” “from this,” or “mine” shows incomplete understanding. True understanding does not cling to such concepts about anything, including unity or multiplicity. Parallel to the Pāli MN1 Mūlapariyāya-sutta. Equivalent to the Madhyamāgama 106.	
Madhyamāgama	T57 (K693)	漏分布經 (Lòufēnbù jīng; Rōbunbu kyō)	(Distinctions in the Effluents Sūtra)	Translated by An Shigao, c. 148–170. 1 fascicle.	No English translation.	The Buddha teaches regarding the definition, cause, result, diversity, cessation, and the way to the cessation of the effluents, feeling, perception, attachment, formations, and suffering. Parallel to the Pāli AN6(63) Nibbedhika-sutta. Equivalent to the Madhyamāgama 111.	
Madhyamāgama	T58 (K685)	阿耨風經 (Ānòufēng jīng; Anokufū kyō)	Anupiyā Sūtra	Translated by Tan Wulan, c. 331–395. 1 fascicle. Considered by scholars to belong to a lost Madhyamāgama, possibly by Dharmanandi and Zhu Fonian.	No English translation.	The Buddha explains to Ānanda that because Devadatta did not do good deeds, it will be hard for him to escape hell. So, people should arouse faith in the Buddha and avoid distractions. Parallel to the Pāli AN6(62) Udaka-sutta. Equivalent to the Madhyamāgama 112.	
Madhyamāgama	T59 (K666)	諸法本經 (Zhūfǎ běn jīng; Shohō hon kyō)	(The Root of All Dharmas Sūtra)	Translated by Zhi Qian, c. 223–253. 1 fascicle.	No English translation.	The Buddha teaches that all dharmas arise from desire, which develops through contact, feeling, and attention. Through right thought, concentration, and wisdom, one attains firm liberation. Parallel to the Pāli AN8(83);10(58) Mūlaka-sutta. Equivalent to Madhyamāgama 113.	
Madhyamāgama	T60 (K683)	瞿曇彌記果經 (Qùtánmí jìguǒ jīng; Gudonmi kika kyō)	(Gautamī's Permission Sūtra)	Translated by Huijian, c. 457. 1 fascicle. Considered by scholars to belong to a lost Madhyamāgama, possibly by Dharmanandi and Zhu Fonian.	No English translation.	An account of Mahāprajāpatī Gautamī's request to join the Saṅgha and the creation of the order of bhikṣuṇīs. Parallel to the Pāli AN8(51) Gotami-sutta and Cullavagga 10(5). Equivalent to the Madhyamāgama 116, T1421 Mahīśāsaka-vinaya 29, and T1428 Dharmaguptaka-vinaya 48.	
Madhyamāgama	T61 (K871)	受新歳經 (Shòuxīnsuì jīng; Jushinsai kyō)	Pravāraṇa Sūtra (Rains Retreat Sūtra)	Translated by Dharmarakṣa, c. 265–313. 1 fascicle.	No English translation.	The Buddha establishes the pravāraṇa, rains retreat, as the period of communical confession and purification, and the Buddha and saṅgha are praised. Parallel to the Pāli SN8(7) Pavāraṇasutta. Equivalent to the Madhyamāgama 121, Saṃyuktāgama T99(1212) & T100(228), Ekottarāgama 32(5), T62 新歲經, and T63 解夏經.	
Madhyamāgama	T62 (K872)	新歲經 (Xīnsuì jīng; Shinsai kyō)	Pravāraṇa Sūtra (Rains Retreat Sūtra)	Translated by Tan Wulan, c. 381–395. 1 fascicle.	No English translation.	The Buddha establishes the pravāraṇa, rains retreat, as the period of communical confession and purification, and the Buddha and saṅgha are praised. Parallel to the Pāli SN8(7) Pavāraṇasutta. Equivalent to the Madhyamāgama 121, Saṃyuktāgama T99(1212) & T100(228), Ekottarāgama 32(5), T61 受新歳經, and T63 解夏經.	
Madhyamāgama	T63 (K1253)	解夏經 (Jiěxià jīng; Kaige kyō)	Pravāraṇa Sūtra (Rains Retreat Sūtra)	Translated by Tianxizai, 998. 1 fascicle.	No English translation.	The Buddha establishes the pravāraṇa, rains retreat, as the period of communical confession and purification, and the Buddha and saṅgha are praised. Parallel to the Pāli SN8(7) Pavāraṇasutta. Equivalent to the Madhyamāgama 121, Saṃyuktāgama T99(1212) & T100(228), Ekottarāgama 32(5), T61 受新歳經, and T62 新歲經.	
Madhyamāgama	T64 (K679)	瞻婆比丘經 (Zhānpó bǐqiū jīng; Senba biku kyō)	Campā Bhikṣu Sūtra	Translated by Faju, c. 290–307. 1 fascicle. Considered by scholars to belong to a lost Madhyamāgama, possibly by Dharmanandi and Zhu Fonian.	No English translation.	After the Buddha refused to teach due to an impure monk being present, Maudgalyayana expelled the corrupt monk, leading the Buddha to delegate the recitation of rules to the monks themselves to ensure the community remains as pure as a weeded field. Parallel to the Pāli AN8(10 & 20) Kāraṇḍavasutta. Equivalent to the Madhyamāgama 122.	
Madhyamāgama	T65 (K680)	伏婬經 (Fú yín jīng; Fukin gyō)	Kāmabhogī Sūtra (Subduing Passion Sūtra)	Translated by Faju, c. 290–307. 1 fascicle. Considered by scholars to belong to a lost Madhyamāgama, possibly by Dharmanandi and Zhu Fonian.	No English translation.	In response to Anāthapiṇḍada's enquiry, the Buddha describes ten types of householders based on how they acquire and use wealth, ultimately praising the one who earns legally, provides for their family, practices charity, and remains spiritually detached from possessions as the most superior. Parallel to the Pāli AN10(91) Kāmabhogīsutta. Equivalent to the Madhyamāgama 126.	
Madhyamāgama	T66 (K694)	魔嬈亂經 (Mó ráoluàn jīng; Ma jōran gyō)	(Māra's Disturbance Sūtra)	Translator unknown, c. 220. 1 fascicle. Considered by scholars to belong to a lost Madhyamāgama, possibly by Dharmanandi and Zhu Fonian.	No English translation.	After Māra attempts to disturb Maudgalyāyana, the latter uses his powers to identify and warn him of the karmic consequences of his deeds, recounting how this previously resulted in him being born in hell. Parallel to the Pāli MN50 Māratajjanīyasutta. Equivalent to the Madhyamāgama 131 and T67.	
Madhyamāgama	T67 (K667)	弊魔試目連經 (Bìmó shì mùlián jīng; Heima shi mokuren gyō)	(Evil Māra Tests Maudgalyāyana Sūtra)	Translated by Zhi Qian, c. 223–253. 1 fascicle.	No English translation.	After Māra attempts to disturb Maudgalyāyana, the latter uses his powers to identify and warn him of the karmic consequences of his deeds, recounting how this previously resulted in him being born in hell. Parallel to the Pāli MN50 Māratajjanīyasutta. Equivalent to the Madhyamāgama 131 and T66.	
Madhyamāgama	T68 (K720)	賴吒和羅經 (Làizhàhéluó jīng; Raitawara kyō)	Rāṣṭrapāla Sūtra	Translated by Zhi Qian, c. 223–253. 1 fascicle.	No English translation.	After winning his parents' consent to ordain through a hunger strike and subsequently attaining arhatship, Raṣṭrapāla returned home to demonstrate his detachment from wealth and family, eventually converting the king by explaining that he sought the path because of the Buddha's teachings on the inescapable nature of old age, illness, death, and insatiable worldly craving. Parallel to the Pāli MN82 Raṭṭhapālasutta. Equivalent to Madhyamāgama 132 and T69.	
Madhyamāgama	T69 (K1255)	護國經 (Hùguó jīng; Gokoku kyō)	Rāṣṭrapāla Sūtra	Translated by Tianxizai in 1001. 1 fascicle.	No English translation.	After winning his parents' consent to ordain through a hunger strike and subsequently attaining arhatship, Raṣṭrapāla returned home to demonstrate his detachment from wealth and family, eventually converting the king by explaining that he sought the path because of the Buddha's teachings on the inescapable nature of old age, illness, death, and insatiable worldly craving. Parallel to the Pāli MN82 Raṭṭhapālasutta. Equivalent to Madhyamāgama 132 and T68.	
Madhyamāgama	T70 (K710)	數經 (Shǔ jīng; Shu kyō)	Gaṇana Sūtra (Counting Sūtra)	Translated by Faju, c. 290–306. 1 fascicle. Considered by scholars to belong to a lost Madhyamāgama, possibly by Dharmanandi and Zhu Fonian.	No English translation.	In response to a mathematician's inquiry about the structure training, the Buddha explains that his path follows a gradual, systematic progression from moral discipline to the mastery of meditation and wisdom, illustrating that ultimate attainment depends on the practitioner's willingness to follow the path correctly. Parallel to the Pāli MN107 Gaṇakamoggallānasutta. Equivalent to Madhyamāgama 144.	
Madhyamāgama	T71 (K719)	梵志頞波羅延問種尊經 (Fànzhì Èbōluóyán Wèn Zhǒngzūn Jīng; Bonshi Apparayen Mon Shushon Kyō)	(The Brāhmaṇa *Appalāyana's Questions Sūtra)	Translated by Tan Wulan, c. 381–395. 1 fascicle.	No English translation.	The Buddha humbles a proud brāhmaṇa youth by dismantling the myth of caste based on biology, social mobility, and moral accountability, ultimately proving that true nobility is earned through virtuous conduct rather than birth. Parallel to the Pāli MN93 Assalāyanasutta. Equivalent to Madhyamāgama 151 and Ekottarāgama 40(9).	
Madhyamāgama	T72 (K700)	三歸五戒慈心厭離功德經 (Sānguī Wǔjiè Cíxīn Yànlí Gōngdé Jīng; Sanki Gokai Jishin Enri Kudoku Kyō)	(The Sūtra on the Merits of the Three Refuges and Five Precepts, Loving Kindness, and Detachment)	Translator unknown, c. 317–420. 1 fascicle.	No English translation.	The Buddha teaches Anāthapiṇḍada that while material giving brings great merit, it is progressively surpassed in spiritual value by taking the Three Refuges and Five Precepts, practising loving-kindness, and ultimately developing the perception of detachment from worldly pleasures to end the cycle of suffering. Parallel to the Pāli AN 9(20) Velāma. Equivalent to the Madhyamāgama 155, Ekottarāgama 27(3), and T73 and T74.	
Madhyamāgama	T73 (K726)	須達經 (Xūdá Jīng; Shudatsu Kyō)	Sudatta Sūtra	Translated by Guṇavṛddhi, c. 492-495. 1 fascicle. Considered by scholars to belong to a lost Madhyamāgama, possibly by Dharmanandi and Zhu Fonian.	No English translation.	The Buddha teaches Sudatta that while material giving brings great merit, it is progressively surpassed in spiritual value by taking the Three Refuges and Five Precepts, practising loving-kindness, and ultimately developing the perception of detachment from worldly pleasures to end the cycle of suffering. Parallel to the Pāli AN 9(20) Velāma. Equivalent to the Madhyamāgama 155, Ekottarāgama 27(3), and T72 and T74.	
Madhyamāgama	T74 (K1181)	長者施報經 (Zhǎngzhě Shībào Jīng; Chōja Sehō Kyō)	(The Householder Anāthapiṇḍada Sūtra)	Translated by Fatian, c. 973. 1 fascicle.	No English translation.	The Buddha teaches Anāthapiṇḍada that while material giving brings great merit, it is progressively surpassed in spiritual value by taking the Three Refuges and Five Precepts, practising loving-kindness, and ultimately developing the perception of detachment from worldly pleasures to end the cycle of suffering. Parallel to the Pāli AN 9(20) Velāma. Equivalent to the Madhyamāgama 155, Ekottarāgama 27(3), and T72 and T73.	
Madhyamāgama	T75 (K715)	黃竹園老婆羅門說學經 (Huángzhúyuán Lǎo Póluómén Shuō Xué Jīng; Ōchikuen Rō Baramon Setsugaku Kyō)	(The Teaching Explained to the Old Brāhmaṇa in the Yellow Bamboo Grove)	Translator unknown, c. 420–479. 1 fascicle. Considered by scholars to belong to a lost Madhyamāgama by Dharmanandi and Zhu Fonian.	No English translation.	An elderly brāhmaṇa initially criticises the Buddha for his perceived lack of etiquette toward elders, but the Buddha responds by explaining that true seniority belongs to the one who has first "broken the shell of ignorance," leading the brāhmaṇa to cast aside his staff in reverence and take refuge in the Triple Gem. Parallel to the Pāli AN8(11) Verañja. Equivalent to the Madhyamāgama 157.	
Madhyamāgama	T76 (K722)	梵摩渝經 (Fànmóyú Jīng; Bonmayu Kyō)	Brahmāyu Sūtra	Translated by Zhi Qian, c. 223–253. 1 fascicle.	No English translation.	The 120-year-old brāhmaṇa master Brahmāyu sends his disciple Uttara to verify if the Buddha possesses the thirty-two marks of a Great Man; after Uttara follows the Buddha for six months and reports on his flawless conduct and physical perfection, Brahmāyu is moved to meet the Buddha himself, receiving a profound teaching on the nature of suffering and liberation that leads him to become an anāgāmin before his death. Parallel to the Pāli MN 91 Brahmāyusutta. Equivalent to the Madhyamāgama 161.	
Madhyamāgama	T77 (K707)	尊上經 (Zūnshàng Jīng; Sonjō Kyō)	(Supreme Sūtra)	Translated by Dharmarakṣa, c. 266–313. Considered by scholars to belong to a lost Madhyamāgama, possibly by Dharmanandi and Zhu Fonian.	No English translation.	In this sutra, a radiant deva visits the monk Lomasakaṅgiya in a cave to encourage him to learn the "Verse of the Auspicious Night" from the Buddha, who subsequently explains that true spiritual excellence is achieved by not dwelling on the past, not yearning for the future, and remaining unattached to the five aggregates in the present moment to attain nirvāṇa. Parallel to the Pāli MN134 Lomasakaṅgiya-bhaddekaratta-sutta. Equivalent to the Madhyamāgama 166.	
Madhyamāgama	T78 (K701)	兜調經 (Dōutiáo jīng; Tojō kyō)	*Tojo Sūtra	Translator unknown, c. 265–317. 1 fascicle.	No English translation.	The Buddha gives the Householder Śuka a discourse on cause and effect, explaining the difference between wholesome and unwholesome retribution. Parallels the Pāli MN135 Cūḷa-kamma-vibhaṅga-sutta, where the householder's name is Subha. Equivalent to Madhyamāgama 170, T79 鸚鵡經, T80 佛為首迦長者說業報差別經, T81 分別善惡報應經, and T755 淨意優婆塞所問經 (which is mistakenly classed among the Mahāyāna sūtras in Taishō vol. 17).	
Madhyamāgama	T79 (K695)	鸚鵡經 (Yīngwǔ jīng; Ōmu kyō)	Śuka Sūtra	Translated by Guṇabhadra, c. 435–443. 1 fascicle. Considered by scholars to belong to a lost Madhyamāgama, possibly by Dharmanandi and Zhu Fonian.	No English translation.	The Buddha gives the Householder Śuka a discourse on cause and effect, explaining the difference between wholesome and unwholesome retribution. Parallels the Pāli MN135 Cūḷa-kamma-vibhaṅga-sutta, where the householder's name is Subha. Equivalent to Madhyamāgama 170, T78 兜調經, T80 佛為首迦長者說業報差別經, T81 分別善惡報應經, and T755 淨意優婆塞所問經 (which is mistakenly classed among the Mahāyāna sūtras in Taishō vol. 17).	
Madhyamāgama	T80 (K805)	佛為首迦長者說業報差別經 (Fó wèi shǒujiā zhǎngzhěshuō yèbào chābié jīng; Butsu i shuka chōja setsu gōhō shabetsu kyō)	(The Buddhaʼs Explanation for the Householder Śuka of Distinctions in Karmic Retribution Sūtra)	Translated by Gautama Dharmaprajña in 582. 1 fascicle.	The Committee for Authorized Translations of Won-Buddhist Scriptures, "Sūtra on the Differences in the Karmic Recompense of Action"	The Buddha gives the Householder Śuka a discourse on cause and effect, explaining the difference between wholesome and unwholesome retribution. Parallels the Pāli MN135 Cūḷa-kamma-vibhaṅga-sutta, where the householder's name is Subha. Equivalent to Madhyamāgama 170, T78 兜調經, T79 鸚鵡經, T81 分別善惡報應經, and T755 淨意優婆塞所問經 (which is mistakenly classed among the Mahāyāna sūtras in Taishō vol. 17).	
Madhyamāgama	T81 (K1098)	分別善惡報應經 (Fēnbié shàn'è bàoyìng jīng; Funbetsu zen'aku hōō kyō)	(Sūtra on Distinguishing Good and Evil Karmic Retribution)	Translated by Tanxizai, 984. 1 fascicle.	No English translation.	The Buddha gives the Householder Śuka a discourse on cause and effect, explaining the difference between wholesome and unwholesome retribution. Parallels the Pāli MN135 Cūḷa-kamma-vibhaṅga-sutta, where the householder's name is Subha. Equivalent to Madhyamāgama 170, T78 兜調經, T79 鸚鵡經, T80 佛為首迦長者說業報差別經, and T755 淨意優婆塞所問經 (which is mistakenly classed among the Mahāyāna sūtras in Taishō vol. 17).	
Madhyamāgama	T82 (K706)	佛說意經 (Fó shuō yì jīng; Bussetsu i kyō)		Considered by scholars to belong to a lost Madhyamāgama, possibly by Dharmanandi and Zhu Fonian.	No English translation.		
Madhyamāgama	T83 (K709)	佛說應法經 (Fó shuō yìngfǎ jīng; Bussetsu ōhō kyō)		Considered by scholars to belong to a lost Madhyamāgama, possibly by Dharmanandi and Zhu Fonian.	No English translation.		
Madhyamāgama	T84 (K1411)	佛說分別布施經 (Fó shuō fēnbié bùshī jīng; Bussetsu funbetsu fuse kyō)			No English translation.		
Madhyamāgama	T85 (K1444)	佛說息諍因緣經 (Fó shuō xīzhèng yīnyuán jīng; Bussetsu sokujō innen kyō)			No English translation.		
Madhyamāgama	T86 (K712)	佛說泥犁經 (Fó shuō nílí jīng; Bussetsu nairi kyō)			No English translation.		
Madhyamāgama	T87 (K721)	佛說齋經 (Fó shuō zhāi jīng; Bussetsu sai kyō)			No English translation.		
Madhyamāgama	T88 (K714)	優陂夷墮舍迦經 (Yōupēiyí duòshějiā jīng; Ubai dashaka kyō)			No English translation.		
Madhyamāgama	T89 (K823)	佛說八關齋經 (Fó shuō bāguānzhāi jīng; Bussetsu hachikansai kyō)			No English translation.		
Madhyamāgama	T90 (K697)	佛說鞞摩肅經 (Fó shuō bǐmósù jīng; Bussetsu himasuku kyō)		Considered by scholars to belong to a lost Madhyamāgama, possibly by Dharmanandi and Zhu Fonian.	No English translation.		
Madhyamāgama	T91 (K703)			Considered by scholars to belong to a lost Madhyamāgama, possibly by Dharmanandi and Zhu Fonian.	No English translation.		
Madhyamāgama	T92 (K704)			Considered by scholars to belong to a lost Madhyamāgama, possibly by Dharmanandi and Zhu Fonian.	No English translation.		
Madhyamāgama	T93 (K702)			Considered by scholars to belong to a lost Madhyamāgama, possibly by Dharmanandi and Zhu Fonian.	No English translation.		
Madhyamāgama	T94 (K698)			Considered by scholars to belong to a lost Madhyamāgama, possibly by Dharmanandi and Zhu Fonian.	No English translation.		
Madhyamāgama	Sūtras of Lost Madhyamāgama Recensions	T95 (K1451)	蟻喩經 (Yǐyù Jīng; Ariyu Kyō)	Vamraka Sūtra (Like a Termite Sūtra)	Translated by Dānapāla in c. 980. 1 fascicle.	No English Translation.	A deva presents a riddle to a mendicant, who seeks an answer from the Buddha. The Buddha explains how that being asked about relate to aspects and obstacles of the Path. Equivalent to the Pāli Vammika Sutta (MN23). Parallels in the Ekottarāgama's "Secret Appearances" (T125(39.9); 姿密), the Saṃyuktāgama's "Destroyed Grain" (T99(38.18); 秡殄), and the Alternative Translation of the Saṃyuktāgama's (T100) sūtra 1.18.
T96 (K999)	Sūtras of Lost Madhyamāgama Recensions	治意經 (Zhì Yì Jīng; Chi I Kyō)	(The Sūtra on Control of the Mind)	Anonymous translator, dating to 265–316 . 1 fascicle.	Shaku Shingan, The Sūtra on the Control of the Mind	The Buddha details the benefits of practising mindfulness of the breath (ānāpānasmṛti) and other ways to control and guard the mind for awakening. There are no known parallels.	
T97 (K725)	Sūtras of Lost Madhyamāgama Recensions	廣義法門經 (Guǎngyì Fǎmén Jīng; Kōgi Hōmon Kyō)	*Arthavighuṣṭa Sūtra (Extensive Meaning Sūtra)	Translated by Paramārtha in 563. 1 fascicle.	No English translation.	Possibly from a northern tradition of the Madhyamāgama. It details Śāriputra's teachings on various dharmas and conduct related to enlightenment and wisdom, contains Mahāyāna elements. No Pāli parallel. Parallel to T98.	
T98 (K717)	Sūtras of Lost Madhyamāgama Recensions	普法義經 (Pǔfǎyì Jīng; Fuhōgi Kyō)	Arthavighuṣṭa Sūtra (Extensive Meaning Sūtra)	Translated by An Shigao in 152. 1 fascicle.	No English translation.	It details Śāriputra's teachings on various dharmas and conduct related to enlightenment and wisdom, contains Mahāyāna elements. No Pāli parallel. Parallel to T97.	
Volume 2
Saṃyuktāgama	T99 (K650)	雜阿含經 (Zá Āhán Jīng; Zō Agon Gyō)	Saṃyuktāgama (The Connected Āgama Collection)	Translated by Baoyun based on a text read out by Guṇabhadra in 435–436. 50 fascicles. With a total of 1362 sūtras, the Taishō has 50 section divisions. Yinshun's suggested reordering sees it divided into 8 vargas with 51 sections.	Anālayo, et al., A Translation of Saṃyukta-āgama Discourses (selected sūtras). Charles Patton, The Related Discourses (selected sūtras).	A collection of Sarvāstivāda origin which includes texts touching on all topics of Buddhist doctrine organised by category. Due to two missing fascicles, starting in China, a two fascicle translation of the Aśokāvadāna by Guṇabhadra has been interpolated, which did not belong to the Indic original of the collection. Yinshun proposed a revised order, based upon details given in the Yogācārabhūmi Śāstra. Yinshun, moreover, suggests that the Saṃyuktāgama is the first collection of Buddhist sūtras, with a diachronic classification into sūtra, geya, and vyākaraṇa (the start of a ninefold classification of buddhavācana). It is a rough equivalent of the Pāli Saṃyutta Nikāya and T100 is an later, shorter, compilation.	
Saṃyuktāgama	T100 (K651)	別譯雜阿含經 (Biéyì Zá Āhán Jīng; Betsuyaku Zō Agon Gyō)	Saṃyuktāgama Alternative Translation (The Connected Āgama Collection Alternative Translation)	Translator unknown, dated to c. 352–431. 16 fascicles.	Marcus Bingenheimer, Studies in Āgama Literature (selected sūtras).	A collection of likely Mūlasarvāstivāda origin. This is a shorter collection of Saṃyuktāgama texts from another recension than T99. A rough equivalent of the Pāli Saṃyutta Nikāya.	
Saṃyuktāgama	T101 (K651)	雜阿含經 (Zá Āhán Jīng; Zō Agon Gyō)	[Fragments of a]Saṃyuktāgama (The Connected Āgama Collection)	Mainly translated by An Shigao, except §9–10, final form dates to c. 222–280. 1 fascicle.	Sūtras 1, 4, 5, 8-13, 15, 16, 20, and 25 translated in Yueh-Mei Lin's Study on the Anthology Za Ahan jing.	An early anonymous translation of a selection of 27 sūtras from the Saṃyuktāgama.	
Saṃyuktāgama	T102 (K745)				No English translation.		
Saṃyuktāgama	T103 (K750)				No English translation.		
Saṃyuktāgama	T104 (K1407)				No English translation.		
Saṃyuktāgama	T105 (K743)				No English translation.		
Saṃyuktāgama	T106 (K733)				No English translation.		
Saṃyuktāgama	T107 (K737)				No English translation.		
Saṃyuktāgama	T108 (K755)				No English translation.		
Saṃyuktāgama	T109 (K741)				No English translation.		
Saṃyuktāgama	T110 (K730)				No English translation.		
Saṃyuktāgama	T111 (K729)				No English translation.		
Saṃyuktāgama	T112 (K742)				No English translation.		
Saṃyuktāgama	T113 (K728)				No English translation.		
Saṃyuktāgama	T114 (K757)				No English translation.		
Saṃyuktāgama	T115 (K752)	馬有八態譬人經 (Mǎ Yǒu Bātài Pìrén Jīng; Ma Yū Hachitai Hijin Kyō)	(The Sūtra on the Eight States of a Horse as a Parable for People)	Translated by Zhī Yào c. 185. 1 fascicle.	Shaku Shingan, The Sūtra on the Eight States of a Horse as a Parable for People.	The Buddha compares eight flawed states of a horse to eight evil states of a human who reacts badly when listening to the Dharma. Equivalent to the Pāli Khaḷuṅka Sutta (AN8.14). Parallels in the Saṃyuktāgama's "Inclination for Wrongdoing" (T99(33.6); 有過) and the Alternative Translation of the Saṁyukatāgama's (T100) sutta 8.18.	
Saṃyuktāgama	T116 (K713)				No English translation.		
Saṃyuktāgama	T117 (K1240)				No English translation.		
Saṃyuktāgama	T118 (K708)	鴦掘摩經 (Yāngjuémó jīng; Yōkutsuma kyō)	Aṅgulimāla Sūtra	Translated by Dharmarakṣa, c. 266–313.	No English translation.	The standard non-Mahāyāna account of how the bandit Aṅgulimāla was converted and awakened by the Buddha. Equivalent to the Saṃyuktāgama versions (T99(1077) & T100(16)) and the Ekottarāgama version (T125(38.6)) and T119. The Mahāyāna version is found at T120.	
Saṃyuktāgama	T119 (K727)	鴦崛髻經 (Yāngjuéjì jīng; Yōkutsukei kyō)	Aṅgulimālika Sūtra	Translated by Faju, c. 290–307.	No English translation.	The standard non-Mahāyāna account of how the bandit Aṅgulimāla was converted and awakened by the Buddha. Equivalent to the Saṃyuktāgama versions (T99(1077) & T100(16)) and the Ekottarāgama version (T125(38.6)) and T118. The Mahāyāna version is found at T120.	
Saṃyuktāgama	T120 (K410)	央掘魔羅經 (Yāngjuémóluó jīng; Ōkutsumara kyō)	Aṅgulimāla Sūtra	Translated by Guṇabhadra, c. 435–443. 4 fascicles.	Rulu, "Sūtra of Aṅgulimālika"	This is a Mahāyāna version of the Aṅgulimāla story which starts with the parallel to the Saṃyuktāgama versions (T99(1077) & T100(16)) and the Ekottarāgama version (T125(38.6)) and the prior two T118-9, but then after Aṅgulimāla enters the saṅgha, he engages in a debate with Mañjuśrī who introduces him to the teachings of Tathāgatagarbha, buddha-lands, and vegetarianism.	
Saṃyuktāgama	T121 (K1447)				No English translation.		
Saṃyuktāgama	T122 (K711)				No English translation.		
Saṃyuktāgama	T123 (K746a)	放牛經 (Fàngniú jīng; Panggo kyō)	*Gopalaka Sūtra (Cow Herder Sūtra)	Translated by Kumārajīva, c. 402–412. 1 fascicle.	No English translation.	A straightforward exposition of the twelve links of dependent origination. Equivalent to the Saṃyuktāgama 1248, Ekottarāgama 49(1), and T124 緣起經. Parallel to the Pāli MN33 Mahāgopalaka Sutta.	
Saṃyuktāgama	T124 (K736)	緣起經 (Yuánqǐ jīng; Engi kyō)	*Pratītya-samutpāda-sūtra (Dependent Origination Sūtra)	Translated by Xuanzang in 661. 1 fascicle.	Peter Lunde Johnson, "The Scripture Explaining the First Arising of Mutually Dependent Conditions (Of Sentient Existence That Cause Affliction)"	A straightforward exposition of the twelve links of dependent origination. Equivalent to the Saṃyuktāgama 1248, Ekottarāgama 49(1), and T123 放牛經. Parallel to the Pāli MN33 Mahāgopalaka Sutta.	
Ekottarikāgama	T125 (K649)	增一阿含經 (Zēngyī Āhán Jīng; Zōitsu Agon Kyō)	Ekottarāgama (The Āgama Collection Increased by One)	Translated by Zhu Fonian based on an original recited from memory by Dharmanandin in c. 384–5. 51 fascicles.	Anālayo, Ekottarika-āgama Studies (selected sūtras). Charles Patton, The Numerical Discourses.	A collection which probably has its origin in the Dharmaguptaka school. This collection contains many Mahāyāna elements. It is a collection of sūtras arranged by sequential numerical theme, starting with one. It is a rough equivalent of the Pāli Aṅguttara Nikāya.	
Ekottarikāgama	T126 (K1229)				No English translation.		
Ekottarikāgama	T127 (K696)				No English translation.		
Ekottarikāgama	T128 (K723) (Taishō has two collations)	須摩提女經 (Xūmótínǚ jīng; Shumadainyo kyō)	Sumāgadhā Sūtra (The Girl Sumāgadhā Sūtra)	Translated by Zhi Qian, 223. 1 fascicle.	No English translation.	A rendition of the story of Anāthapiṇḍada's daughter Sumāgadha. Equivalent to Ekottarikāgama 30(3) and the next T129-130.	
Ekottarikāgama	T129 (K790)	三摩竭經 (Sānmójié jīng; Sanmaka kyō)	Sumāgadhā Sūtra	Translated by Zhu Lüyan, c. 230. 1 fascicle.	No English translation.	A rendition of the story of Anāthapiṇḍada's daughter Sumāgadha. Equivalent to Ekottarikāgama 30(3) and the prior T128 and T130.	
Ekottarikāgama	T130 (K1428)	給孤長者女得度因緣經 (Jǐgū Zhǎngzhě Nǚ Dédù Yīnyuán Jīng; Kyūko Chōja Jo Tokudo Innen-gyō)	[*Sumāgadhā-avadāna-sūtra] (Sūtra on the Causes and Conditions for the Householder Anāthapiṇḍada’s Daughter to Attain Liberation)	Translated by Dānapāla, c. 980. 3 fascicles.	Possibly translated by Tsuru-Matsu Tokiwai in an 1898 publication (Studien zum Sumagadhāvadāna).	Anāthapiṇḍada's daughter, Sumāgadhā marries into a non-Buddhist household, and praises the Buddha to them prompting them to want to visit him. The Buddha and the saṅgha come to receive alms at their house. Various disciples perform miracles to increase their faith. When the Buddha arrives, everyone gains faith and benefits, confirming that the daughter had previously planted wholesome roots in the presence of Kāśyapa Buddha. Equivalent to Ekottarikāgama 30(3) and the prior T128-129.	
Ekottarikāgama	T131 (K705)				No English translation.		
Ekottarikāgama	T132 (K699)				No English translation.		
Ekottarikāgama	T133 (K716)				No English translation.		
Ekottarikāgama	T134 (K724)				No English translation.		
Ekottarikāgama	T135 (K749)				No English translation.		
Ekottarikāgama	T136 (K748)				No English translation.		
Ekottarikāgama	T137 (K751)				No English translation.		
Ekottarikāgama	T138 (K756)				No English translation.		
Ekottarikāgama	T139 (K732)				No English translation.		
Ekottarikāgama	T140 (K738)				No English translation.		
Ekottarikāgama	T141 (K774)	阿遬達經 (Āsùdá jīng; Asokuda kyō)	*Aśokadatta-sūtra	Translated by Guṇabhadra, c. 435–443. 1 fascicle.	No English translation.	The Anāthapiṇḍada's granddaughter, Sujatā, is excessively vain, so the Buddha teaches her about morality to train her. Parallel to the Pāli AN7(59). Equivalent to the Ekottarāgama 51(9), T412 玉耶女經 and T413 玉耶經 with potential Confucian additions.	
Ekottarikāgama	T142 (K772) (Taishō has two collations)	玉耶女經 (Yùyénǚ jīng; Gyokuyanyo kyō)	(Lady Sujatā Sūtra)	Translator unknown, c. 265–316. 1 fascicle.	Yuet Keung Lo, "The Yuyenü Jing"	The Anāthapiṇḍada's granddaughter, Sujatā, is excessively vain, so the Buddha teaches her about morality to train her. Parallel to the Pāli AN7(59). Equivalent to the Ekottarāgama 51(9), T141 阿遬達經 and T143 玉耶經 with potential Confucian additions.	
Ekottarikāgama	T143 (K771)	玉耶經 (Yùyé jīng; Gyokuya kyō)	Sujatā Sūtra	Translated by Tan Wulan, c. 318–395. 1 fascicle.	No English translation.	The Anāthapiṇḍada's granddaughter, Sujatā, is excessively vain, so the Buddha teaches her about morality to train her. Parallel to the Pāli AN7(59). Equivalent to the Ekottarāgama 51(9), T141 阿遬達經 and T142 玉耶女經 with potential Confucian additions.	
Ekottarikāgama	T144 (K754)				No English translation.		
Ekottarikāgama	T145 (K753)				No English translation.		
Ekottarikāgama	T146 (K734)	舍衛國王夢見十事經 (Shèwèi Guówáng Mèngjiàn Shí Shì Jīng; Shabaikoku-ō Muken Jisshijō Kyō)	(The Ten Dreams of the King of Śrāvastī)	Translator unknown, c. 265-316. 1 fascicle	No English translation.	King Prasenajit is terrified by ten dreams that a brāhmaṇa interprets as requiring human sacrifice, but the Buddha explains that they are not about the king, but rather about the future ages of moral degeneracy. The king resolves to trust the Buddha over other teachers. Equivalent to Ekottarikāgama 52(9) and T147-8.	
Ekottarikāgama	T147 (K735)	舍衛國王十夢經 (Shèwèi Guówáng Shí Mèng Jīng; Shabaikoku-ō Jūmu Kyō)	(The Ten Dreams of the King of Śrāvastī)	Translator unknown, c. 265-316. 1 fascicle.	No English translation.	King Prasenajit is terrified by ten dreams that a brāhmaṇa interprets as requiring human sacrifice, but the Buddha explains that they are not about the king, but rather about the future ages of moral degeneracy. The king resolves to trust the Buddha over other teachers. Equivalent to Ekottarikāgama 52(9), T146, and T148.	
Ekottarikāgama	T148 (K758)	國王不梨先泥十夢經 (uówáng Bùlíxiānnī Shímèng Jīng; Kokuō Purinsendei Jūmu Kyō)	(King Prasenajit's Ten Dreams Sūtra)	Translated by Tan Mulan, c. 381–395. 1 fascicle.	Partially translated from French of Chavannes by Amitendranath Tagore, Sutra on Dreams of King Prasenajit.	King Prasenajit is terrified by ten dreams that a brāhmaṇa interprets as requiring human sacrifice, but the Buddha explains that they are not about the king, but rather about the future ages of moral degeneracy. The king resolves to trust the Buddha over other teachers. Equivalent to Ekottarikāgama 52(9) and the prior T146-7.	
*Ānanda-sahāyaka	T149 (K740)				No English translation.		
*Ānanda-sahāyaka	T150a (K738)	七處三觀經 (Qīchù Sānguān Jīng; Shichisho Sankan Kyō)	(Seven Abodes and Three Contemplations Sūtra)	translated by An Shigao, c. 151.	Partially translated by Tilmann Vetter and Paul Harrison, The Saptasthānasūtra	A compilation of 47 short sūtras from an Ekottarikāgama collection.	
*Ānanda-sahāyaka	T150b (K882)				No English translation.		
*Ānanda-sahāyaka	T151 (K813)	佛說阿含正行經 ā hán zhèng xíng jīng	The Sutra of the Correct Practice of the Agamas	Translated An Shigao (fl. c. 148-180 CE)	No English translation.		
