= Morita therapy =

Form of psychotherapy

Morita therapy is a therapy developed by Shoma Morita (1874–1938).

The goal of Morita therapy is to have the patient accept life as it is and places an emphasis on letting nature take its course. Morita therapy views feeling emotions as part of the laws of nature.

Morita therapy was originally developed to address shinkeishitsu, an outdated term used in Japan to describe patients who have various types of anxiety. Morita therapy was designed not to completely rid the patient of shinkeishitsu but to lessen the damaging effects.

Morita therapy has been described as cognate to Albert Ellis's rational-emotive therapy. It also has commonalities with existential and cognitive behavioral therapy. Substantial overlap is also found with acceptance and commitment therapy (ACT), in stressing the acceptance of that what can't be changed and the healing power of acting, the latter well supported by neuroscience; they differ though in the Western ACT having a grander vision of self-expression and traditional Japanese Morita Therapy having the more modest ideal of finding harmony.

== Background ==
Shoma Morita (1874–1938) was a psychiatrist, researcher, philosopher, and academic department chair at Jikei University School of Medicine in Tokyo. Morita's training in Zen influenced his teachings, though Morita therapy is not a Zen practice.

== Philosophy ==
Morita therapy focuses on cultivating awareness and decentralizing the self. Aspects of mindfulness are contained in knowing what is controllable and what is not controllable, and seeing what is so without attachment to expectations. Feelings are acknowledged even when one does not act on them. The individual can focus on the full scope of the present moment and determine what needs to be done.

Morita therapy seeks to have patients learn to accept fluctuations of thoughts and feelings and ground their behavior in reality. Cure is not defined by the alleviation of discomfort (which the philosophy of this approach opposes), but by taking action in one's life to not be ruled by one's emotional state.

== Stages ==
Morita is a four-stage process of therapy involving:

- Absolute bed rest
- Occupational therapy (work therapy) (light)
- Occupational therapy (work therapy) (heavy)
- Complex activities

In the first stage, the patient is ordered to stay on absolute bed rest, even to take meals, only rising to use the restroom. When the patient expresses boredom, they may move to the second stage.

During the second stage, patients are introduced to light and monotonous work that is conducted in silence. The second stage takes three to seven days. Patients may wash their face in the morning and evening, read aloud from the Kojiki, and write in a journal. In this phase, patients are also required to go outside. No strenuous physical work is allowed, such as climbing stairs and sweeping.

In the third stage, patients are allowed to engage in moderate physical work, but not social interaction. This stage lasts from three to seven days. For people with physical injuries, it is the phase where they were treating themselves through physical therapy. The patient is encouraged to spend time in creating art.

The fourth stage is the stage where patients are reintroduced into society. It can last from one to two weeks. The patient integrates meditation and physical activity. The patient may return to the previous stages and their teacher.

== Methods (Western) ==
Shoma Morita's work was first published in Japan in 1928. Morita Therapy Methods (MTM) adapted the therapy to modern western culture. For example, the original Morita treatment process has the patient spend their first week of treatment isolated in a room without any outside stimulation, which has been modified in MTM.

The shinkeishitsu concept has also been broadened to also consider life situations in which modern westerners may find themselves, involving stress, pain and the aftermath of trauma. MTM is also designed to help patients deal with shyness. MTM is also roughly divided into four basic areas of treatment.

== Research ==
A Cochrane review conducted in 2015 assessed the effectiveness of Morita based therapy for anxiety disorder in adults. They defined Morita therapy as any care practice defined as Morita therapy by the carers and involving at least two of the four phases. The review does not include a single case of Classic Morita Therapy being used, all studies were conducted in hospitals in the People's Republic of China between about 1994 and 2007. The review states there is very low evidence available and it is not possible to draw a conclusion based on the included studies.

== See also ==
- Shoma Morita
- Naikan
- Quiet sitting
- Buddhism
