= Dānapāla =

Indian Buddhist monk and translator (died 1017)

- दानपाल

Personal life
- Born: unknown Oddiyana
- Died: 1017 CE 12th month 26th day (month and date are in the Chinese lunar calendar) China
- Flourished: 960-1017 CE
- Occupation: Buddhist monk, scholar, and translator
- Relatives: Devaśāntika (older brother)

Religious life
- Religion: Buddhism
- School: Vajrayana

Senior posting
- Awards: Great Master of the Manifested Teaching （显教大师）

Chinese name
- Traditional Chinese: 施護
- Simplified Chinese: 施护
Transcriptions
Standard Mandarin
- Hanyu Pinyin: Shī hù
- Wade–Giles: Shih^{1} hu^{4}

Vietnamese name
- Vietnamese: Thí hộ

Korean name
- Hangul: 시호
- Hanja: 施護
Transcriptions
- Revised Romanization: Siho

Japanese name
- Kanji: 施護
- Hiragana: せご
Transcriptions
- Romanization: Sego

Dānapāla or Shihu (died 1017) was an Indian Buddhist monk and prolific translator of Sanskrit Buddhist sutras during the Song dynasty in China.

== Life ==
A native of Oddiyana, he was a Vajrayana monk at Oddiyana's Vaijayanta Saṁghārama before arriving with his brother Devaśāntika in the Song dynasty capital Bianjing (now called Kaifeng) in 980 CE. (Note: Sen 2016 In 987 the emperor changed his name from Devaśāntika to Dharmabhadra.) (Note: Lu 2010 According to Lu, many of the Buddhist monks coming from India to China at that time were trying to escape Islamic invasion of their homelands and resulting oppression. [The Oddiyana region at approximately this period faced numerous incursions.]) Emperor Song Taizong wanted the translation of more Indian Buddhist sutras. However, he was unsure about Dānapāla, Devaśāntika, and Dharmadeva's translation abilities. He then invited them to the Imperial Palace and tested their translation abilities with Sanskrit sutras kept at his palace. As they were all bilingual in Chinese and Sanskrit, (Note: Sen 2016 Dānapāla is noted to have studied various forms of scripts prevalent in the five regions of India, and also learned the scripts of Khotan, Srivijaya and Java.) the three satisfied Emperor Song Taizong's translation expectations. He then built a new translation bureau in 982 CE, called the "Institute for the Translation of Sutras" on the western side of the Taiping Xingguo Monastery. The emperor also bestowed honorary purple robes to Dānapāla and cohorts. (Note: Sen 2016 The presentation of purple robe and the title of Master of Purple Robe that came with it was, as Kenneth Ch'en has pointed out, 'the highest honor the state could bestow on a monk' [in China]) The emperor bestowed the honorary title 'Great Master of the Manifested Teaching' on Dānapāla. Dānapāla was assigned as one of the key translators of the newly founded Institute. Along with his cohorts, he thus restarted translation of Sanskrit Buddhist texts in China after a 170-year hiatus. (Note: Sen 2016 According to Song Dynasty historian Zanning 贊寧 (919-1001), no Buddhist texts were translated for 160 years after the Kapisa monk Prajna's 般若 translation of the 大乘本生心地觀經 [in 811 CE. However, a total of one hundred seventy years passed before state-sponsored voluminous translation renewed at the newly built Institute.]) Devaśāntika and Dharmadeva, the two other chief translators at the Institute, died in 1000 CE and 1001 CE respectively. He became the only chief Indian translator left at the Institute with only the assistance of Wei Jing (惟淨), a Chinese monk trained in Sanskrit at the Institute. It was not until 1006 with the arrival of Dharmapāla that he had another Indian translator to assist him in his work. (Note: Lu 2010 According to Lu, there were two persons named Dharmapāla. The first Dharmapāla was the brother of Dharmadeva who came from Central India (Magadha's Nalanda Monastery). The Dharmapāla who helped Dānapāla came from North India.) (Note: Sen 2016 Dharmapāla (who assisted Dānapāla) was a native of Kashmir and a monk from Vikramaśīla.) Altogether he translated over 100 sutras, sastras and stotras, greatly contributing to the Chinese understanding of Vajrayana Buddhism and its popularization.

== Legacy ==
The important Vajrayana root text Sarvatathāgata Tattvasaṃgraha Tantra was originally translated by Amoghavajra into Chinese during the 8th century CE, but it was an incomplete translation. Dānapāla was part of the team of translators who re-translated the entire Sarvatathāgata Tattvasaṃgraha Tantra. Dānapāla's contribution included the 1st and 14th-16th out of 18 sections. He also translated other Vajrayana sutras such as Māyopamasamādhi Sutra among others. Dānapāla also translated many non-Vajrayana texts such as the Nāgārjuna's Yuktiṣaṣṭikā, Mahāyānaviṃsaka, Dignāga's Prajñāpāramitāpiṇḍārthaḥ as well as a version of the Aṣṭasāhasrikā Prajñāpāramitā Sūtra, the Heart Sutra entitled 'The Holy Mother of [All] Buddhas Prajñāpāramitā Sūtra' and the Candropama Sūtra the Sanskrit version of Saṃyutta Nikāya 16.3. (Note: entry 佛說聖佛母般若波羅蜜多經 The Buddha Speaks The Holy Mother of [All] Buddhas Prajñāpāramitā Sūtra is translated into simpler and clearer language than the other (Chinese) long version editions of the Heart Sutra.)

== Sources ==
- 佛光山大詞典 [Foguangshan Dictionary of Buddhism] (in Traditional Chinese). 1989.
- Lancaster, Lewis; Park, Sung-Bae (1979). Korean Buddhist Canon - A Descriptive Catalog.
- Lu, Wei et al. (呂徵等著) (2010). 中國佛教人物 [Important Persons in Chinese Buddhism] (in Simplified Chinese). p. 69.
- Sen, Tansen (2016). Buddhism, Diplomacy and Trade-The Realignment of India-China Relations (600-1400).
- Toganō, Shōun(栂尾祥雲) (1983) [1933]. 蜜教史 [A History of Vajrayana] (in Traditional Chinese). Translated by Shi, Shengyen (釋聖嚴).
