= Yoshimoto Ishin =

Yoshimoto Ishin (吉本伊信, May 25, 1916 – August 1, 1988) was a Japanese businessman and Jodo Shinshu Buddhist priest who was the founder of the Naikan (内観 looking inside) meditation method in the 1940s, which later was utilised as a psychotherapy treatment. He later acted as prison chaplain to spread Naikan to prisoners.

== Development of Naikan ==
During his study of Buddhism, Yoshimoto followed the ascetic practice of Mishirabe - an arduous form of meditation and self reflection which included physical privations including fasting, avoidance of sleep, and intense introspection sessions. Wanting to make this practice more accessible to everyone, Yoshimoto developed Naikan as a relatively easier method allowing anyone to gain the benefits of self reflection without the physical discomforts required by Mishirabe.

At its core, Naikan is a method of structured self reflection based around three basic questions -

What have I received from____?

What have I given to_____?

What troubles and difficulties have I caused____?

There are currently more than 30 Naikan centres in Japan, offering mental health counselling, addiction treatment, and the rehabilitation of prisoners.

== Life ==
- 1916 May 25 Born as the 3rd son of Ihachi and Yukie Yoshimoto in Yamatokōriyama, Nara Prefecture. Ihachi was a rich farmer. Ishin’s father was strict and smart, and his mother was gentle.
- 1923 May 12. Yoshimoto’s younger sister Chieko happened to die of measles. Their mother Yukie was bereaved, and sought solace from Buddhism. Yoshimoto accompanied his mother as she visited temples, and became interested in Buddhism from that time.
- 1929 April. Yoshimoto graduated Katagiri Primary School and entered Kōriyama Secondary School.
- 1930 September. Following his father’s advice, Yoshimoto transferred to Kōriyama Agricultural School.
- 1932 March. Yoshimoto graduated high school and started to learn Jōdo Shinshū teachings at a temple. Jōdo Shinshū is a sect of Buddhism founded by Shinran, and it requires strong faith to Amida Budda solely, praying mantra "Namu-Amidabustu".
- 1934 Ihachi opened a fertiliser shop in central Yamatokōriyama.
