= Shoma Morita =

Japanese psychologist

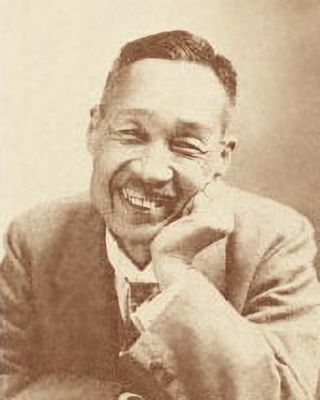
Dr. Shoma Morita (1874-1938)

Masatake Morita (森田 正馬, Morita Masatake; 1874–1938), also read as Shōma Morita, was the founder of Morita therapy, a branch of clinical psychology strongly influenced by Zen Buddhism. In his capacity as the head of psychiatry for a large Tokyo hospital, Morita began developing his methods while working with sufferers of shinkeishitsu, or anxiety disorders with a hypochondriac base.

== Theory and methods ==
According to Morita, how a person feels is important as a sensation and as an indicator for the present moment, but is uncontrollable: we don't create feelings, feelings happen to us. Since feelings do not cause our behavior, we can coexist with unpleasant feelings while still taking constructive action.

The essence of Morita's method maybe summarized in three rules: Accept all your feelings, know your purpose(s), and do what needs to be done. When once asked what shy people should do, Morita replied, "Sweat."

- Accept your feelings - Accepting feelings is not ignoring them or avoiding them, but welcoming them; Vietnamese poet and writer Thich Nhat Hanh recommends we say, "Hello Loneliness, how are you today? Come, sit by me and I will take care of you." Morita's advice: "In feelings, it is best to be wealthy and generous" - that is, have many and let them fly as they wish.
- Know your purpose - Implicit in Morita's method, and the traditional Buddhist psychological principles which he adapted, is an independence of thought and action, something a little alien to the Western ideal to "follow our whims and moods". Morita held that we can no more control our thoughts than we can control the weather, as both are phenomena of most amazingly complex natural systems. And if we have no hope of controlling our emotions, we can hardly be held responsible any more than we can be held responsible for feeling hot or cold. We do, however, have complete dominion over our behavior, and for Morita, that is a sacred responsibility. "What needs doing now?" is like a mantra in his methods.
- Do what needs doing - One can feel crushed and alone or hurt and homicidal while pulling up the weeds in your garden, but one would not be doing it at all if one had not intended to raise flowers. Morita's way of treatment is very different from the Western diagnosis/disease model. Morita's methods lead his "students" through experiments, and in each assignment, the lesson is not explained by a master, but learned first hand, through the "doing" or taiken, that knowledge gained by direct experience.

== Influence ==
David K. Reynolds, an American author, synthesized parts of Morita therapy along with the practice of Naikan into Constructive Living, an educational method intended for English-speaking Westerners. Constructive Living has since become extremely popular in Japan, and Reynolds is the only non-Japanese citizen to receive the Kora Prize and the Morita Prize by the Morita Therapy Association of Japan.

Fritz Perls spent a week in a Morita Hospital in Japan.
