= Naikan =

Structured method of self-reflection developed by Yoshimoto Ishin

Naikan (Japanese: 内観, lit. 'introspection') is a structured method of self-reflection influenced by Shin Buddhist principles. The term first appears in the work of the Shin Buddhist thinker Kiyozawa Manshi (1863–1903) to refer to a form of ethical and religious introspection. The practice of naikan was taken up by Kiyozawa's followers and developed in numerous directions.

Influenced by these modern developments, as well as by his experiences in ascetic practice, the Shin Buddhist cleric Rev. Yoshimoto Ishin (1916–1988) developed a form of therapy in the 1940s which he also called naikan.

== History ==
Kiyozawa Manshi’s philosophy, called Seishinshugi, articulated a vision of spiritual discipline grounded in introspective self-cultivation, rigorous philosophical inquiry, and a reorientation of Shin Buddhist thought. His 1901 essay “Seishinshugi” defined this program, while his concurrent leadership in the newly established Shinshū University signaled an effort to distance Shin Buddhist thought from the conservatism of Kyoto’s clerical institutions. Kiyozawa himself identified the Āgamas, Epictetus, and the Tannishō as foundational sources that exemplified uncompromising dedication to the pursuit of the highest good. Kiyozawa advanced an array of neologisms, including naikan-shugi, to describe a disciplined interior practice in which truth is disclosed through self-reflection and then enacted in conduct. This served as the basis for a broader Shin Buddhist modernism in which genuine religious experience grounds ethical and social life. Kiyozawa stressed an ascetic, inwardly detached orientation that renounces dependence on worldly identities and securities, arguing that only such inner renunciation allows entry into the “divine ground” of religion.

Yoshimoto Ishin was a businessman and devout Jodo Shinshu Buddhist who, as a young man, had engaged in an ascetic practices called mishirabe which involved sensory deprivation, by dwelling in a dark cave without food, water or sleep. Wishing to make such introspection available to others he developed Naikan as a less difficult method which he first introduced to young people who had been incarcerated for committing crime and social disturbances. Yoshimoto removed the extreme austerities once associated with mishirabe and organized Naikan around three core questions: what one has received from others, what one has given in return, and what burdens one has imposed. Later the practice was introduced to the general public. Naikan practitioners claim that Naikan helps people understand themselves and their relationships.

The mishirabe practices which influenced Naikan therapy are also still conducted in a religious context within some Jodo Shinshu temples and communities but the harsh, ascetic nature of Yoshimoto Ishin's original practice is unusual given the Jodo Shinshu rejection of self-power practice.

Today, there are around 30 Naikan centers in Japan, and it is used in mental health counseling, and in rehabilitation of prisoners. The practice has also taken root in Europe, with Naikan centers now established in Austria and Germany.

== Naikan therapy ==
The practice of naikan is based around asking oneself three questions about a person in one's life:

- What did I receive from this person?
- What did I return to this person?
- What troubles, worries, unhappiness did I cause this person?

Formal methods of self-reflection generally involve certain basic characteristics. First, there is the requirement for time which is set aside exclusively for the purpose of self-reflection. Second, use of a space, preferably with some degree of isolation that limits external distraction. And third, the application of questions or structure which helps us examine our lives with an emphasis on our conduct in relation to other people, creatures and objects. Its structure uses our relationships with others as the mirror in which people can see themselves. We reflect on what we have received from others, what we have given, and what troubles we have caused.

There are many forms of Naikan practice, all focusing on these three questions. Intensive Naikan normally takes the form of a week-long retreat involving extended periods of solitary reflection punctuated by brief interviews with a therapist. Practitioners review their relationships methodically (from childhood onward) and attempt to reconstruct concrete memories of interactions with parents, family members, and others. This extended scrutiny often leads to a reorientation of how one understands past events and interpersonal dynamics.

Alongside the retreat format, Naikan can be sustained as a daily discipline of morning and evening reflection. The purpose of intensive practice is to internalize a mode of awareness that then becomes a continuous aspect of everyday life, in which one evaluates one’s conduct, emotional states, and gratitude toward others. Daily practice aims to restrain habitual tendencies toward greed, anger, and jealousy while reinforcing a more objective and appreciative attitude.

A related fourth question, "What troubles and difficulties has this person caused me?", is purposely ignored in Naikan. Naikan presupposes that people are naturally able to see answers to this fourth question, and that too much focus on this question is responsible for unhappiness in day-to-day life.

The family-relationship focus of traditional Naikan may sometimes be less appropriate to those with fragmented or seriously dysfunctional family backgrounds. However, as with Buddhist metta meditation (mettā bhāvanā), there is no reason why Naikan practice need necessarily take family relationships as starting point. The benefit of looking at family relationships is that these are often most emotionally complex and connected with our sense of 'self'.

Naikan has been adopted in a wide range of institutional settings such as schools, prisons, rehabilitation centers, hospitals, and religious communities, and has spread internationally. Beyond clinical contexts, Naikan has been used in spiritual care, including end-of-life support.

== Bibliography ==
- Chikako Ozawa-de Silva (2007). Demystifying Japanese Therapy: An Analysis of Naikan and the Ajase Complex through Buddhist Thought, Ethos 35, (4), 411–446
