= Sengzhao =

Chinese Buddhist philosopher (384–414)

Sengzhao (Chinese: 僧肇; pinyin: Sēngzhào; Wade–Giles: Seng-chao; Japanese: 僧肇, Sōjō; 374–414) was a Chinese Buddhist philosopher from Later Qin. Born to a poor family in Jingzhao, he acquired literary skills and became a scribe. This exposed him to a variety of uncommon documents. He was influenced by the Taoists Laozi and Zhuangzi, and although we are told he enjoyed Laozi’s Daodejing, he was overjoyed when he discovered the Vimalakīirti Sūtra. This encounter transformed his life and he became a Buddhist. He was known as being among the ablest of the disciples of Kumārajīva.

Sengzhao was recognized as both a scholar of high skill and someone of profound understanding relating to religious matters. He was involved in translating Indian treatises, which formed the source of study for early Chinese Mādhyamika Buddhism. He also authored a small number of texts, but is famous for the book Zhaolun. Its chapters are: "Things Do Not Shift," "Non-Absolute Emptiness," "Prajna Is Without Dichotomizing Knowledge," and "Nirvana Is Without Conceptualization."

== Biography ==
Sengzhao was born to a poor family in 374 near Chang’an. As his family was poor, he took up work as a copyist, which exposed him to many writings, and was initially drawn to Neo-Daoism. Though particularly fond of the Laozi and Zhuangzi, he ultimately found himself unsatisfied with these texts. Sengzhao was later captivated by an encounter with Zhi Qian's 3rd century translation of the Vimalakīrti Sutra. According to the Gaoseng zhuan, "When later he read the old translation of the Vimalakīrti sūtra he was filled with joy and admiration. He read it again and again and thoroughly enjoyed it. 'Now', he said, 'I know where I belong'. So he decided to become a monk. He favoured the Vaipulya sūtras (the Prajñāpāramitās) but also studied the (Hīnayāna) Tripiṭaka." Thus, Sengzhao converted to Buddhism and became a monk. He quickly became well known for his intellect and skill in debate, and in 398, Sengzhao joined Kumārajīva in Guzang. According to Robinson, that Sengzhao was determined to brave the difficult diplomatic tensions between the kingdoms of Later Qin and Later Liang to reach Guzang shows his adventurous spirit and early devotion to Kumārajīva.

In early 402, Kumārajīva was called to Chang’an by Yao Xing, the king of the Later Qin. Sengzhao thus returned to Chang’an, accompanying Kumārajīva, and was assigned by Yao Xing to assist Kumārajīva in his translations, thus affording Sengzhao the opportunity to learn Kumārajīva's interpretation of Buddhist doctrine. Sengzhao joined Kumārajīva's translation academy, which also included such figures as Sengrui, Daorong, Sengdao, Tanying, and others. Sengzhao became one of Kumārajīva's chief intellectual collaborators, and around 405, upon Kumārajīva's translation of the Pañcaviṃśati Prajñāpāramitā Sūtra (Perfection of Wisdom in 25,000 Lines), Sengzhao composed his first essay, "Prajñā Without Knowing." When he presented the text to Kumārajīva, the latter praised it, stating that although his and Sengzhao's understanding were the same, Sengzhao's phrasing was superior.

In 408, Daosheng took the essay to Huiyuan's community at Lushan, where it was praised and widely circulated. There the lay recluse Liu Yimin wrote a letter to Sengzhao expressing several doubts regarding Sengzhao's doctrine. Sengzhao wrote a lengthy response and sent it back to Lushan by messenger, but Liu passed away before it arrived. Afterwards, Sengzhao composed his next essay, likely between 408 and 411, titled "Emptiness as Nonsubstantiality," followed by "Things Do Not Shift." He also wrote a commentary on the Vimalakīrti Sūtra, as well as some prefaces, and after the death of Kumārajīva, composed his last and longest essay, "Nirvana is Unnameable." Sengzhao presented the latter to the king Yao Xing who praised it and circulated it among the royal family. Sengzhao also composed an obituary for Kumārajīva.

== Writings ==
The following is a list of materials included in the collection of Sengzhao's essays known as the Zhaolun:

- Prajna Without Knowing, written between 404 and 408 (T 1858, XLV, 153a–54c).
- Emptiness as Nonsubstantiality, written probably after 408 (T 1858, XLV, 152–53a).
- Things Do Not Shift, perhaps written after Emptiness as Nonsubstantiality (T 1858, XLV, 151a–c ).
- Correspondence with Liu Yimin (on the subject of Prajñā Without Knowing) (T 1858, XLV, pp. 154c–57a). Seng-zhao's answer to Liu Yimin's letter was written in 410.
- Nirvana is Unnameable, written between the fourth month of 413, and Seng-zhao 's death in 414 (T 1858, XLV, 157a–61b). Robinson observes that at least some parts of this essay are spurious.
- Introductory chapter of the Zhaolun (T 1858, XLV, pp. 150c–51a). According to Robinson, this was probably written by the Zhaolun's compiler rather than by Sengzhao himself.

The Zhaolun was first translated (1948) into English as The Book of Chao by Walter Liebenthal, and later (1968) republished in a revised edition with the revised title of Chao Lun, the Treatises of Seng-chao. Wing-tsit Chan has also included two chapters of the Zhaolun in his A Source Book in Chinese Philosophy. A partial translation of many of his treatises can also be found in Richard H. Robinson's Early Mādhyamika in India and China. Most recently, the Zhaolun has been translated into English by Rafal Felbur.

In addition to his essays in the Zhaolun, the following is a list of documents which are also attributed to Sengzhao:

- Vimalakīrti-Nirdeśa Commentary, written between 406 and 410 (T 1775). Robinson observes thar Zürcher worked on a manuscript translation of most of this. However, Zürcher's translation was never published.
- Obituary of Kumārajīva, written in 413 or 414. According to Felbur, some scholars question the authenticity of this text.
- Preface to the Vimalakīrti-Nirdeśa Sūtra, translated in 406.
- Preface to the Śata-śāstra of Āryadeva, translated in 404.
- Preface to the Brahmajāla-sūtra (T 1484, XXIV, 997a). This is a Mahāyāna sūtra, and is not to be confused with the Brahmajāla Sūtta. Robinson notes that as this sūtra is likely a Chinese composition, rather than a translation, the preface is subject to suspicion.
- Preface to the Dīrghāgama, translated in 413.
- Postface to the Saddharmapuṇḍarīka Sūtra (T 2068, pp. 54b ff.) According to Robinson, the evidence indicates that this attribution is spurious.
- The Baozang lun (T 1857, pp.143b–50a). The attribution of this text to Sengzhao is disputed by modern scholarship. Sharf connects this text with the Oxhead School of Chan Buddhism, which flourished during the Tang dynasty (several centuries after Sengzhao).

== Thought ==
The Zhaolun consists of several essays in which Sengzhao addresses such topics including the "sagely mind" and how it differs from the mind of an ordinary person, the nature of emptiness, the applicability of language to prajñā, and the question of whether attainment is sudden or gradual, among other related topics. According to Felbur, a characteristic feature of the lun (expository essay) genre to which Sengzhao's essays belong is that "Though often polemical, the rhetoric of lun is not primarily argumentative but rather persuasive: it does not rely on strict logical reasoning but instead on an aesthetic appeal designed to solicit the reader's intellectual and emotional assent."

=== Prajñā without knowing ===
In his essay, "Prajñā without Knowing," Sengzhao explains the manner in which prajñā knows all yet without taking individual things as objects. Sengzhao writes, "For every thing that is known, there is a thing that is not known. But in the sagely mind, there is no thing that is known, thus there is nothing not known. This knowledgeless knowing is called 'all-knowledge.' Thus, the words of the sutra true are: 'In the sagely mind there is nothing known, nothing not known.'" As Liu Ming-Wood explains, since the ordinary person has "the deliberate mind," they possess specific aims which limit their attention to individual objects and aspects of the world, blinding them to all others which fall outside of their focus. On the other hand, as the perfect person is without this deliberate mind, their vision is without restriction and able to encompass the whole of reality. It is in this sense that, without knowing anything in particular, there is nothing that is not known.

Similarly, Richard Robinson observes that for Sengzhao, "Since there is nothing real except Absolute Truth, Prajñā knows everything in knowing Absolute Truth. Thus, to know everything, it does not have to apprehend the marks of mundane objects, since they are delusions, and not anything to be known absolutely." Robinson further observes that Sengzhao's holy person can be said to possess the properties of "holy mind," "holy knowledge," "holy spirit," and "holy response." Regarding their meanings, holy mind refers to the function of prajñā, the holy knowledge mirroring the absolute. Since the absolute is devoid of marks, this is unlike mundane cognition. Though holy mind and the absolute are distinct in terms of function, they are the same in essence. As for holy spirit, this refers to the agent of holy response, which is the sage's aspect of activity contrasted with the cognitive aspect of the holy mind. Both holy spirit and holy mind are ubiquitous and neither arise nor cease.

For Sengzhao, the sage is able to act in the world in perfect tranquility. For while the sage is serene and does nothing, nothing is left not done. As Ming-Wood explains, Sengzhao's sage neither affirms a non-being free of marks nor a being with marks, while also not forsaking these. As such, since there is no forsaking non-being, the sage "does nothing," and yet, not forsaking being either, "nothing is left undone." In this way, non-action and action are united. Sengzhao also writes, "Spirit has the function of responding to and according [with events], yet it is free from deliberate effort. Since spirit is free from deliberate effort, it can reign sovereign beyond the world. Since wisdom is without knowledge, it can mysteriously illuminate beyond [conditioned] events. Yet, even though wisdom is beyond events it is never without them. Though the spirit is beyond the world it is always within its borders." Sengzhao further states:

Therefore, as [the sage] contemplates [the earth] below and [the heavens] above and follows their transformations, he accords with phenomena and responds to them with an inexhaustible acuity, there are no depths to which his vision cannot reach, yet his illumination shines forth with no deliberate effort. This is how not-knowing knows, how sagely spirit accords with phenomena.

In this way, although the sage is vacuous, it nonetheless possesses an illuminating function. As Sengzhao writes:

Since the sage is numinous by its power, even though it is vacuous it never forfeits its illuminative functioning. Since it lacks form or name, even though it is illuminating it never loses its vacuity. While illuminating it does not lose its vacuity; therefore it merges with things without being altered by them. Even though it is vacuous, it never ceases to illuminate; therefore its every movement meets gross phenomena.

According to Sengzhao, from the point of view of function, "the light of solitary mirroring" within illuminates the "myriad dharmas" without. From this point of view, outer and inner enter into mutual relation, and yet they are not one. Sengzhao says, "This is the aspect of function: [under this aspect even] the sage cannot make them one." On the other hand, he explains that from the point of view of stillness, "knowledgeless illumination within" and "markless reality without" are equally unagitated and thus not different. As Sengzhao writes, "This is the aspect of stillness: [under this aspect even] the sage cannot make them different." He goes on to explain that these two aspects, function and stillness, are one body. He writes, "Its functioning is one with its stillness, its stillness is one with its functioning; the two are of one body, 'one in origin, different in name.' Truly, there is here no motionless stillness that could prevail over function. The darker the wisdom, the brighter its illumination; the quieter the spirit, the swifter its response."

In his reply to a letter from the layman Liu Yimin, Sengzhao responds to a number of questions raised by Liu concerning Sengzhao's essay "Prajñā Without Knowing," such as whether the sage's stillness and illumination are equivalent to "concentration" and "wisdom." Sengzhao argues that there is no distinguishing between concentration and wisdom for the sage for whom all things converge in unity. Accordingly, Sengzhao explains that such terms "have no bearing at all on the [sagely] self." His response also addresses Liu's confusion as to how the sage remains within the world while yet transcending it. Sengzhao explains that as things do not exist, the sage has no grasping at them, and yet, there being no nonexistence either, the sage does not reject anything. As such, Sengzhao states, "Since he does not reject them, things wondrously abide as one with the ultimate. Since he does not grasp them, names and forms no longer bring each other about. When there are no more names and forms, he cannot be said to have knowledge. When things wondrously abide as one with the ultimate, he cannot be said to be without knowing."

=== View of emptiness ===
Sengzhao's essay, "Emptiness as Nonsubstantiality" critiques three competing views of emptiness in his time: [1] emptiness as no-mentation, [2] emptiness as original non-being, and [3] emptiness as form. Sengzhao rejects each of these positions. He argues that emptiness does not abandon form, but is rather its essential characteristic: Form is by nature insubstantial. According to Sengzhao, the doctrine of no-mentation takes emptiness to be a psychological state in which "mind no longer reaches out toward things" but which fails to see that things themselves are empty. The doctrine of original non-being Sengzhao faults for being "obsessed with the idea of nonbeing". As for the doctrine of emptiness as form, while it understands that forms are not self-produced, Sengzhao says, "it has yet to grasp the truth that forms as such are not forms."

In this essay, Sengzhao also critiques the "doctrine of names," i.e. the view of a one-to-one correspondence between names and "actuals," the existential counterparts of terms. According to Robinson, this view resembles the philosophy of Xunzi, who held that it was possible to define terms such that they corresponded to actual things. In his repudiation of this doctrine, Sengzhao states:

If you seek a thing through a name, in the thing there is no actual that matches the name. If you seek a name through a thing, the name has no efficacy to obtain the thing. A thing without an actual to match its name is not a thing. A name without efficacy to obtain a thing is not a name. Therefore, names do not match actuals, and actuals do not match names. Since there is no matching of names and actuals, where do the myriad dharmas occur? ... Thus we know that the myriad things are not absolute, but arbitrary designations.

=== View of time ===
In "Things Do Not Shift" Sengzhao argues against the ordinary conception of time, i.e. where the ordinary person believes things arise, endure for a time, and then cease to exist, arising and ceasing are in fact empty. According to Sengzhao, things do not move since what is present does not "pass away" into the past, nor does what is past "come" into the present. As Sengzhao explains, "If present [things] could reach the past, then the past should contain those present [things]. If past [things] could reach the present, then the present should contain those past [things]. But there are no past [things] in the present, which shows again that [things] do not come. And there are no present [things] in the past, which shows once more that [things] do not depart." Further, according to Sengzhao, though things are free of coming and going, their essential stillness is not something to be sought apart from motion, as motion and stillness are not two. In this wise, Sengzhao writes:

It is said in the Radiance, “Dharmas neither come nor go, they do not move in any way.” Is their motionless activity to be sought by discarding motion and instead pursuing stillness? No, it is within all movements that stillness is to be sought. Since stillness is to be sought within all movements, though moving, dharmas are constantly still. Since stillness is to be sought without discarding motion, though still, their motion never ceases. Indeed, motion and stillness are in no way distinct. (Note: The Ming-era Chan master Hanshan Deqing attained insight into emptiness when he observed his urine stream and recalled Sengzhao's analogy in the essay "Things Do Not Shift" that rivers remain still while nonetheless gushing forth.)

Sengzhao further states that the truth that phenomena are still while in motion, and in motion while still, "can only be encountered with the spirit, it cannot be found amid ordinary affairs."

=== Nirvana is unnameable ===
Sengzhao's final and longest essay, "Nirvana is Unnameable," examines the nature of nirvāṇa, which Sengzhao describes as "that recondite abode beyond words." He explains that what the scriptures speak of as "nirvāṇa with remainder" and "nirvāṇa without remainder" are merely conventional descriptions for different modes of the sage's response, i.e. reaching out to things and withdrawing from them. According to Sengzhao, nirvāṇa is vacuous, markless, and cannot be known with a deliberate mind. As such, it transcends all existents. Yet at the same time, it is not merely nonexistent. For as Sengzhao explains, within nirvāṇa, "the recondite numen is never depleted of its power." As such, the spirit remains ever active within it, yet it produces no karma.

According to Sengzhao, the perfected person is "quiescent, imperceptible, without any external form." As such, although Buddha may take on birth or form in any realm, he is without any arising or body. Thus, while present, Buddha does not exist. At the same time, although Buddha seems to vanish into parinirvāṇa, he is not nonexistent. Sengzhao also critiques the notion that Buddha is distressed by mind and body, and so eradicates them to enter nonbeing. Instead, Sengzhao argues, "the sage's wisdom embraces all things yet it is never belabored; his bodily form fills the eight directions but this brings him no distress." Additionally, for Sengzhao, the mind of the sage arises in response to the deliberate mind of beings, while his form appears in response to the forms existing in the world. In this manner, his mind and forms do not emerge from his own self.

On the other hand, Liebenthal notes that this essay also introduces the sage as the creator of the world. As it states, "The Perfect Man eludes all description, no likeness is found of him, and yet it is He who has created all things on Earth." However, according to Liebenthal, there does not seem to be any room in Sengzhao's thought for ascribing the role of a personal creator to the sage, who is elsewhere treated as the perfect void identical to the world's fullness. Liebenthal thus argues that the word zao 造 ("create") must instead refer to "self-manifestation." Liebenthal writes that for Sengzhao, the sage "rules the world, cares for all beings, and knows all that happens. In short, he is Nature personified. More than that, he is the Light of Life, permeating and animating the universe which is a living universe. In this creative act the Mirror fills with the forms and sounds of daily life." Liebenthal further connects that which Sengzhao calls "creation" with the "illumining act of the Tathāgata" which is imperishable.

Sengzhao also elaborates in this essay on the manner in which the sage is without action and yet leaves nothing undone. Sengzhao explains that as the sage does not act, though in motion, he is constantly still. Yet at the same time, though still, the sage is constantly in motion, and in this way, the sage leaves nothing undone. Thus, action (wei) and non-action (wu-wei) are identical for the sage. Sengzhao argues that the sagely mind is neither existent nor nonexistent in that it is neither a deliberate mind of thought nor a lack of mind resembling a hollow space. Accordingly, Sengzhao writes that "the sage's 'action' cannot be taken to mean that he engages in deliberate activity, nor can speaking of his 'non-action' be taken to mean that he simply does not act."

This essay also attempts to adjudicate a debate between the king Yao Xing and his younger brother over the question of whether awakening is sudden, requiring no effort or study, or gradual. Sengzhao sides with the king arguing that awakening is a gradual process, though he makes several alterations to the king's view. Concerning gradual awakening, the essay argues that the Dharma is vacuous and limitless, and as such, afflictions cannot be eradicated all at once to realize it completely in a single instant. It cites the Daodejing, which states that to practice the Dao is to diminish daily (unlike the path of learning, which is a daily accrual). Diminishing daily, one approaches the unconditioned until there is nothing left to diminish. It is explained that just as the light of a firefly and the sun differ, so too are there various grades of wisdom which differ.

Some scholars have argued that at least some parts of this essay are not authentic. For example, Liebenthal points out that while the essay argues for different grades of awakening, Sengzhao's essay, "Prajñā Without Knowing," asserts the opposite. There a simile is invoked to argue that ultimate truth is without the limitations of the "hare" and "horse," where hare and horse refer to varying degrees of understanding: the hare crosses the river of saṃsāra on the surface, representing the śrāvaka, while the horse crosses with its hooves reaching deeper into the water, representing the pratyekabuddha. Given this discrepancy, Liebenthal believes "Someone must have tampered with the original Nieh-p’an wu-ming lun [Nirvana is Unnameable]." He concludes that someone supplemented fragments of the original essay with material from the Jianwu lun 漸悟論 (Treatise on Gradual Enlightenment) by Huiguan. On the other hand, the Japanese scholar Ōchō Enichi believed the essay to be authentic.

=== Samādhi of the dharmakāya ===
In his commentary on the Vimalakīrti Sūtra, Sengzhao comments on Vimalakīrti's explanation that "not to manifest body or mind in the three planes is samādhi." Sengzhao calls this the "samādhi of the dharmakāya." It is described by Robinson as "a super-sensuous mode of illumination" that is not dependent on the senses, imagination, or bodily postures. Sengzhao also explains that, unlike the trance of cessation entered into by the Hīnayānist, which is characterized by a lack of movement, the Mahāsattva in "reality-samādhi" fills all directions and responds to circumstances everywhere, "rising, moving, advancing and halting." Further, for Sengzhao, it is because the holy person does not manifest body or mind in the three planes that he is able to display all postures and function in ordinary activities. As Sengzhao writes, "because he has no displaying, he is able to have nothing that he does not display."

Robinson also addresses the lack of any "concrete empirical method for realizing the Holy Mind" (such as a dhyāna manual) among Sengzhao's writings. Robinson observes that while Sengzhao may have been familiar with the methods in the meditation manual known as the Bodhisattva-dhyāna, Kumārajīva's first translation, he would have had the understanding that "such practices were imperfect dhyāna and led to inferior samādhis. It is more probable that the study of the Sūtras and Śāstras and the contemplation of their doctrines were his 'concrete empirical method for realizing the Holy Mind.'"

== Later references and influence ==
Sengzhao is mentioned in the Memoirs of Eminent Monks. A number of other accounts exist concerning the life of Sengzhao. The Weishou [a collection of canonical texts] accords Sengzhao preeminence among the eight hundred or so scholars gathered at Chang’an: “Daorong and his fellows were of knowledge and learning all-pervasive, and Sengzhao was the greatest of them. When Kumārajīva made a translation, Sengzhao would always take pen in hand and define the meanings of words. He annotated the Vimalakrtinirdesha Sutra and also published several treatises. They all have subtle meaning, and scholars venerate them.” (Hurvitz 54) This highlights Sengzhao's importance as a liaison between the Indian Kumārajīva and the Chinese language. All indications point to the foreign master's reliance on Sengzhao's ability to “translate” the Indian terminology into stylistically acceptable Chinese.

The Chan text known as the Jingde Chuandenglu compiled in 1004 mentions that Sengzhao was executed for some unspecified reason due to "difficulties surrounding the Ch’in ruler." The text explains that as he was about to be executed, he uttered the following:

The four elements originally have no master,
The five aggregates [that compose the self] are fundamentally void.
The naked blade approaches my neck,
As if cleaving through the spring breeze.

According to the gong’an (meditation puzzle) collection known as the Blue Cliff Record compiled in 1128 by Yuanwu (1063–1135), Sengzhao begged for a reprieve of seven days before his execution during which he composed the Treasure Store Treatise (Baozang lun). The attribution of this text to Sengzhao is disputed by modern scholarship. Yuanwu also mentions that Sengzhao not only took Kumārajīva as his teacher, but "He also called on the bodhisattva Buddhabhadra at the Tile Coffin Temple, who had transmitted the Mind Seal from the Twenty-seventh Patriarch (Prajnatara) in India. Chao entered deeply into the inner sanctum."

Felbur observes that Sengzhao's death became the stuff of legend in Chan Buddhism, and that the Oxhead Chan text, the Baozang lun, is presented as though it were written by Sengzhao himself. Similarly, Liebenthal notes the undeniable influence Sengzhao had on Chan Buddhism, observing that allusions to Sengzhao are a common appearance in Chan writings.

Felbur also writes that although Sengzhao is commonly regarded a patriarch of the Sanlun school of East Asian Madhyamaka, "Sengzhao himself never claimed any sectarian affiliation. Indeed, the tendency to compartmentalize Chinese Buddhism into 'sects' or 'lineages' postdates Sengzhao in the history of the tradition by many centuries, and reflects less the realities on the ground and more the historian's and bibliographer's need for systematization."
