= Caotang Temple =

Buddhist temple on Mount Guifeng, China

- 草堂寺
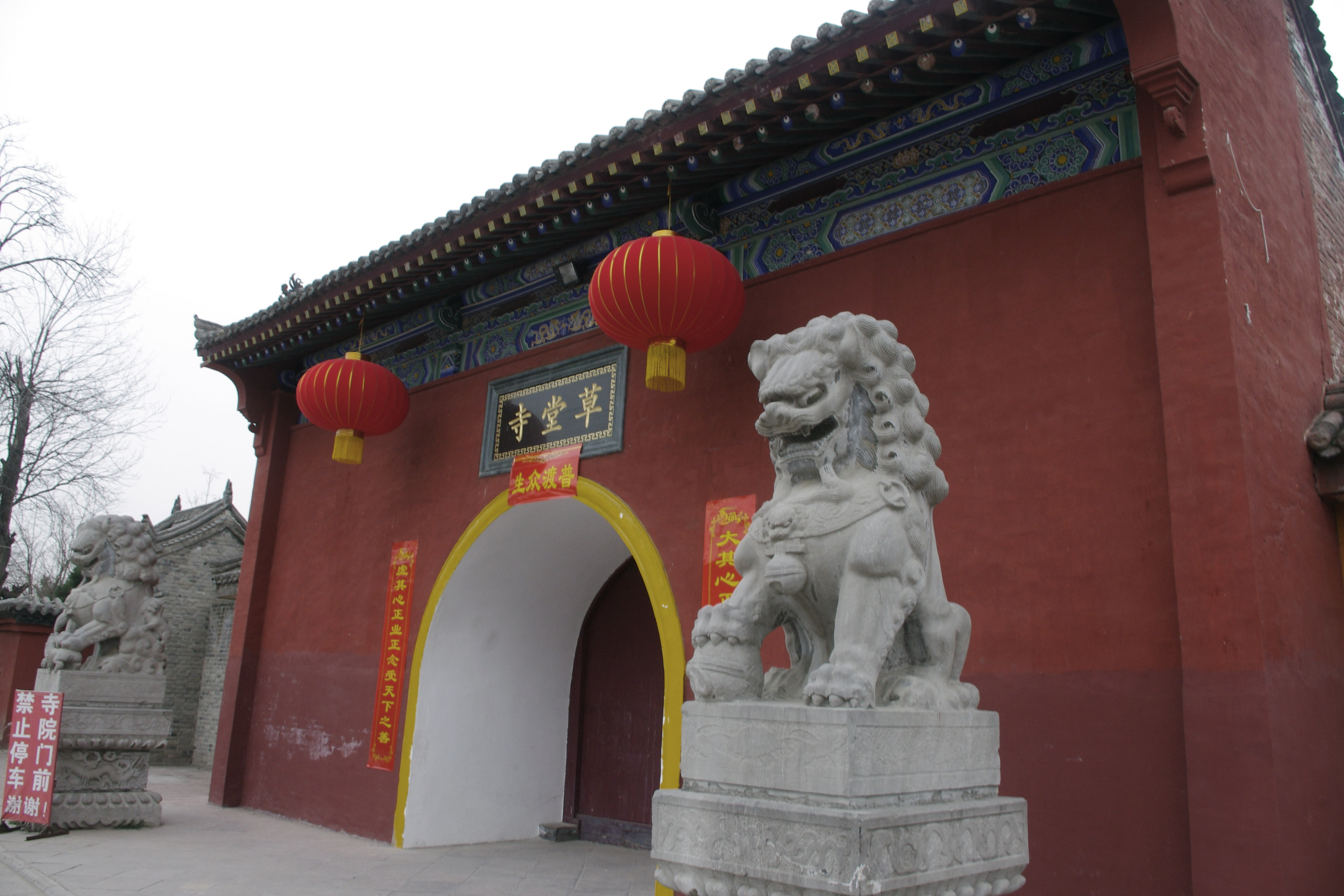
- The Shanmen at Caotang Temple.

- Location within China

Religion
- Affiliation: Buddhism
- Sect: East Asian Mādhyamaka; Huayan

Location
- Location: Mount Guifeng, Huyi District, Xi'an, Shaanxi
- Country: China
- Interactive map of Caotang Temple
- Coordinates: 34°01′12″N 108°45′02″E

Architecture
- Style: Chinese architecture
- Founder: Yao Xing
- Established: 401

Caotang Temple (Chinese: 草堂寺; pinyin: Cǎotáng Sì; lit. 'Cottage Temple') is a Buddhist temple located on the north hillside of Mount Guifeng, in Huyi District of Xi'an, Shaanxi, China.

In the Later Qin (384–417), Kumārajīva resided in Caotang Temple, where he translated Madhyamika-sastra (中论), Sata-sastra (百论) and Dvadashamukha Shastra (十二门论), which laid the foundation for the theory of East Asian Mādhyamaka, so he is respected as the founder of East Asian Mādhyamaka and Caotang Temple is considered as the cradle of East Asian Mādhyamaka.

== History ==
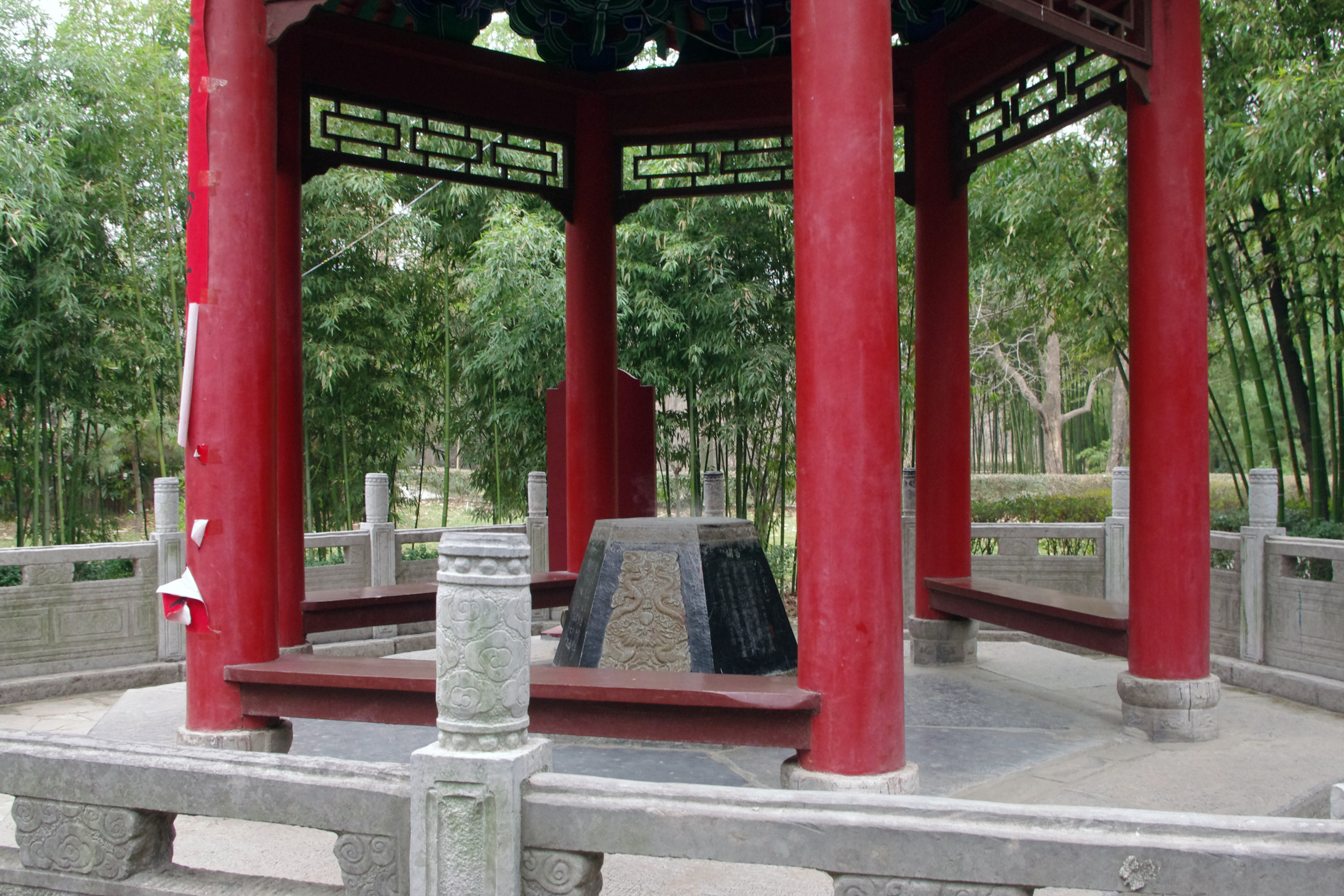
Caotang Yanwu (草堂烟雾; Caotang Temple is shrouded in thick smog), praised as one of the Eight Views of Guanzhong.

=== Later Qin ===
Caotang Temple traces its origins to the former Xiaoyang Garden (逍遥园), founded by Emperor Yao Xing of Later Qin (384–417) in 401 in order to provide accommodation for renowned Buddhist missionary monk Kumārajīva.

=== Sui dynasty ===
In 606, in the 2nd year of Daye period of Sui dynasty (581–618), Li Yuan, the then prefectural governor of Zhengzhou, visited and presented a Buddha statue to the temple.

=== Tang dynasty ===
After the establishment of the Tang Empire (618–907), Emperor Taizong came to worship the Buddha and wrote poems in the temple. During the reign of Emperor Xuanzong (685–762), Master Feixi (飞锡) settled at Caotang Temple, where he taught Buddhism for many years. In the Yuanhe era of Emperor Xianzong (806–820), the emperor issued the decree rebuilding the temple. Master Guifeng Zongmi was proposed as the abbot. Under his leadership, Caotang Temple was refurbished and redecorated and renamed "Qi Chan Temple" (栖禅寺). After the fall of Tang Empire in the early 10th century, the temple became dilapidated for wars.

=== Song dynasty ===
In 966, in the 4th year of Qiande period of the Song dynasty (960–1276), the imperial court renovated the temple and renamed it "Qingliang Jianfu Temple" (清凉建福寺).

=== Jin dynasty ===
In 1193, in the reign of Emperor Zhangzong of Jin dynasty (1115–1234), Master Bianzheng (辨正) added lecture hall and it restored the original name.

=== Qing dynasty ===
In 1734, in the Yongzheng era of the Qing dynasty (1644–1911), after the canonization of Kumārajīva's disciple Sengzhao (僧肇), the temple was renamed "Sheng'en Temple" (圣恩寺), which means royal graciousness. In the Tongzhi period (1862–1874), the temple was completely destroyed by wars. In 1881 in the Guangxu period (1875–1908), the recently established temple was washed away by the flood.

=== People's Republic of China ===
After the founding of PRC, a restoration of the entire temple complex was carried out in 1952. On August 6, 1956, Caotang Temple was listed among the first group of provincial level key cultural heritage by Shaanxi Provincial Government.

Caotang Temple had been designated as a National Key Buddhist Temple in Han Chinese Area by the State Council of China in 1983. In 1984, the temple resumed its religious activities.

== Architecture ==
Main structures from the Shanmen to the Abbot's Room are aligned with the central axis and divided into five courtyards. At the very front are Shanmen, followed by Four Heavenly Kings Hall, Mahavira Hall, Dabei Hall (Hall of Great Compassion), Hall of Ksitigarbha, Hall of Three Saints, and finally Abbot's Room in the rear. On both sides of the central axis are Bell Tower, Drum Tower, Memorial Hall of Kumārajīva, stone pagoda, Hall of Reclining Buddha, Pavilion of Guanyin, and ring-rooms.

=== Shanmen ===
The Shanmen is 11 metres (36 ft) wide and 6.8 metres (22 ft) deep and only has one door. The hall is flush gable roof style (硬山顶). Under the eaves is a plaque with the Chinese characters "Caotang Temple" written by Zhao Puchu, the then president of the Buddhist Association of China.

=== Four Heavenly Kings Hall ===
The Maitreya Buddha and Four Heavenly Kings' statues are enshrined in the Four Heavenly Kings Hall.

=== Mahavira Hall ===
The Mahavira Hall enshrining the statues of Sakyamuni, Amitabha and Bhaisajyaguru. The two disciples' statues are placed in front of the statue of Sakyamuni, the older is called Kassapa Buddha and the middle-aged is called Ananda. A plaque with "Mahavira Hall" written by Zhao Puchu is hung on the architrave. The statues of Eighteen Arhats stand on both sides of the hall. The hall has a double-eave gable and hip roof (重檐歇山顶).

=== Dabei Hall ===
The Dabei Hall (Hall of Great Compassion) was built in the Qianlong period (1736–1796) of the Qing dynasty (1644–1911). It is 18.21 metres (59.7 ft) wide and 9.5 metres (31 ft) deep. The hall is flush gable roof style. In the center of the eaves of the hall is a plaque "Xiaoyang Sanzang" (逍遥三藏) written by monk Miaokuo (妙括) in 1947.

=== Hall of Reclining Buddha ===
The jade statue of Reclining Buddha enshrined in the hall, which was presented by a Burmese Fu Fengying (傅凤英) in 1994.

=== Dharma Hall ===
The Dharma Hall is 28 metres (92 ft) wide and 13 metres (43 ft) deep. In the middle of the hall, a 2-metre (6 ft 7 in) high wood carving statue of Vairocana stands in the lotus throne with thousand petals, which has a little Buddha statue on each petal. the altar was carved with one thousand little statues of Buddha, which known as "Vairocana nestling among thousand Buddha" (千佛绕毗卢).

=== Buddhist Texts Library ===
Occupying an area of 3,760 square metres (40,500 sq ft), the Buddhist Texts Library has a double-eave gable and hip roof. The hall started to build in 2005 and completed in October 2014. Five gilded copper statues of Buddha are enshrined in the hall.

=== Memorial Hall of Kumārajīva ===
The Memorial Hall of Kumārajīva was built by monks of Japanese Nichiren Buddhism. It is 24 metres (79 ft) wide and 16.5 metres (54 ft) deep. A 120-centimetre (47 in) high wood carving statue of Kumārajīva which sitting on a lotus throne is placed in the hall. At the back of his statue is a painting of flying apsaras which was painted by Japanese painter Mise (真美子). Several steles of poems written by Zhao Puchu and other Japanese poets are inlaid on the walls.

== National Treasures ==
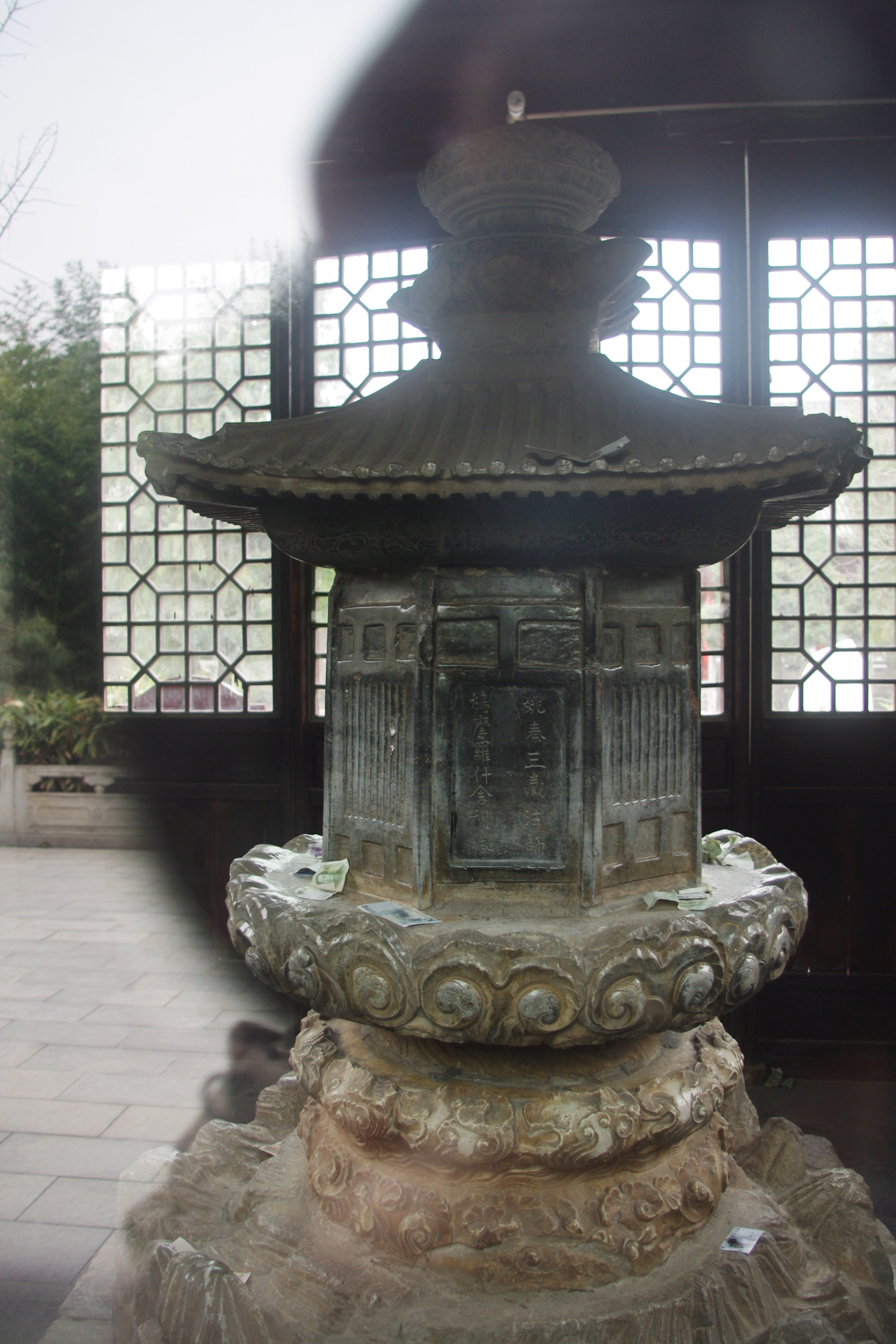
The Stupa of Kumārajīva.

=== Stupa of Kumārajīva ===
The Stupa of Kumārajīva was made of marble in the Later Qin (384–417). The octahedral-based stupa has twelve stories and is 2.46 metres (8 ft 1 in) high. It is composed of a base, a sumeru throne and a dense-eave body. The base has three layers with engraved patterns of clouds.

=== Ming dynasty bell ===
The 2.6-metre (8 ft 6 in) high Ming dynasty (1368–1644) bell was cast in the Ming dynasty weighting 5,000 kilograms (11,000 lb) with its bore is 2.2 metres (7 ft 3 in). Outside of the bell cast over 14 Buddhist temples, 200 Buddhist monks and works of Buddhist inscriptions. At the bottom of the bell are engraved with patterns of various flying phoenixes, dragons, lions, Bagua, etc.
