= Jizang =

Tang Dynasty philosopher

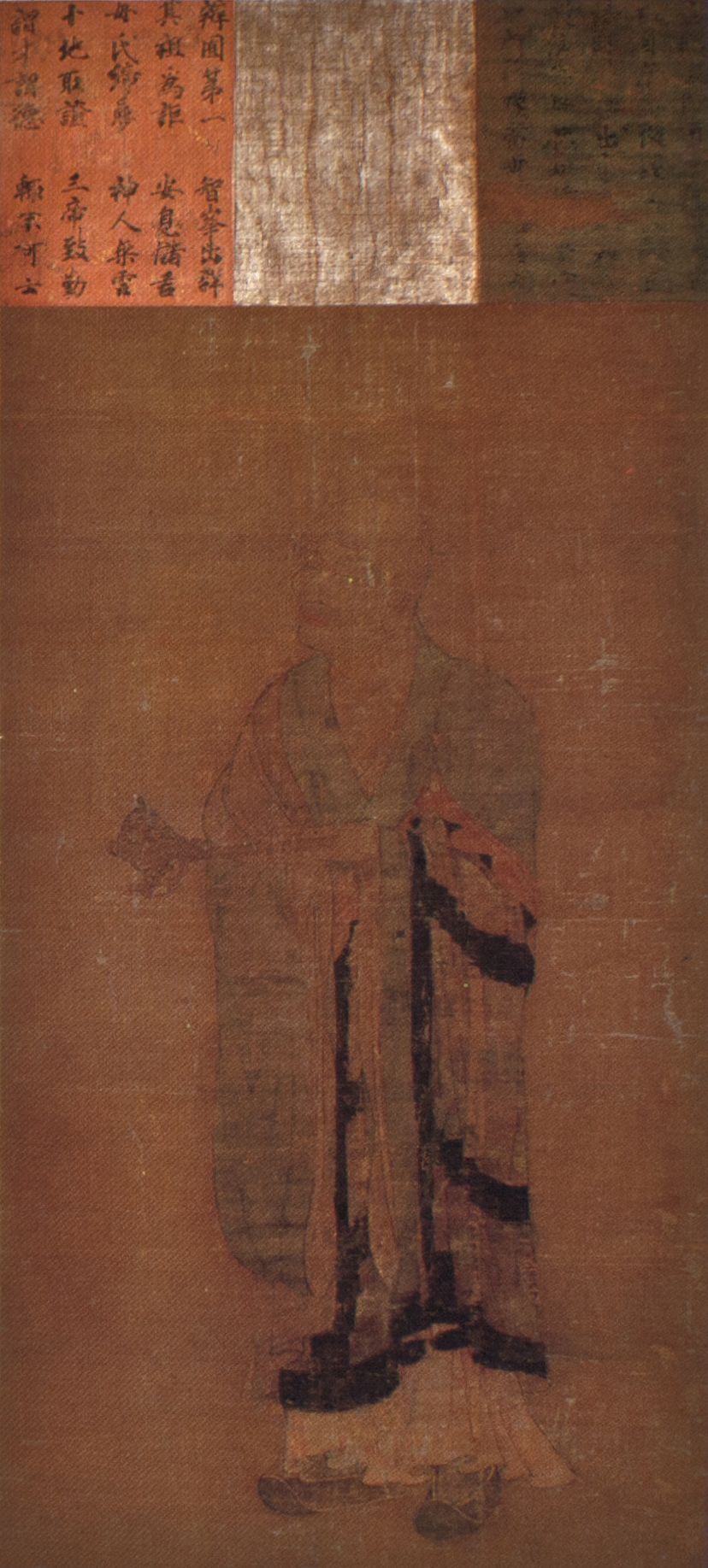
Jizang, Todaiji 13th century

Jizang (Chinese: 吉藏; pinyin: Jízàng; Wade–Giles: Chi-tsang. Japanese: 吉蔵 (kichizō)) (549–623) was a Persian-Chinese Buddhist monk and scholar who is often regarded as the founder of East Asian Mādhyamaka. He is also known as Jiaxiang or Master Jiaxiang (Chinese: 嘉祥; Wade–Giles: chia hsiang) because he acquired fame at the Jiaxiang Temple.

== Biography ==
Jizang was born in Jinling (modern Nanjing). Although his father had emigrated from Parthia, he was educated in the Chinese manner. He was quite precocious in spiritual matters and became a monk at age seven. When he was young, he studied with Falang (法朗, 507–581) at the Xinghuang Temple (興皇寺) in Nanjing, and studied the three Madhyamaka treatises (The Treatise on the Middle Way, The Treatise on the Twelve Gates, and The One-Hundred-Verse Treatise) which had been translated by Kumarajiva more than a century before, and it is with these texts that he is most often identified. He became the head monk at Xinghuang Temple upon Falang's death in 581. At age 42, he began traveling through China giving lectures, and ultimately settled at Jiaxing Temple, in modern Shaoxing (紹興), Zhejiang province. Jizang also encountered the Indian monk, Paramartha who gave him his Dharma name.

In 597, Yang Kuang, later Emperor Yang, the second son of Emperor Wen of the Sui dynasty, ordered four new temples in the capital Chang'an, and invited Jizang to be in charge of one of them, called Huiri Temple (彗日寺). Jizang accepted, despite the fame of Yang's harshness. Zhiyi (538–597 CE), a respected figure of the Tiantai school, had accepted to become a monk at another one of the new temples, and Jizang sought to visit him, but unfortunately, he died before Jizang was able to meet him. He was, however, able to correspond with him regarding the Lotus Sutra. Later he moved to another new temple, Riyan Temple (日嚴寺). When the Sui dynasty was succeeded by the Tang dynasty in 617, he gained the respect and support of the new emperor, Gaozu as well, and became head abbot of four temples.

Between ages 57 and 68, he sought to make more copies of the Lotus Sutra so that more people could be familiar with it. He produced 2,000 copies of the sutra and he also made copies of some of his own commentaries.

Jizang was a prodigious writer, producing close to 50 books in his lifetime. He specialized in commentaries on the three treatises as well as texts from other Buddhist traditions, such as the Lotus and Nirvana sutras. His students included Hyegwan, Korean by nationality, who brought the Three Treatise School to Japan.

== Philosophy ==
The general outlook of the Madhyamaka school is that commitments or attachments to anything, including a logical viewpoint, lead to dukkha (suffering). In commenting on Buddhist treatises, Jizang developed a general methodology of poxie xianzheng ("refuting what is misleading, revealing what is corrective"), by-passing the pitfalls of asserting the truth or falsehood of certain propositions in a final or rigid sense, but using them if they pragmatically lead to the ability to overcome the commitment to dichotomy. He noted that the tendency of many Buddhists to become committed to becoming unattached (shunyata or "emptying") is also itself a commitment that should be avoided. One can avoid this by engaging in the same deconstruction that allowed liberation in the first place but applied to the false dichotomy between attachment and non-attachment (shūnyatā shūnyatā, or "emptying of emptiness").

Applying this to the traditional two levels of discourse inherited from the Madhyamaka tradition (the conventional, regarding everyday thoughts, and the authentic, which transcends this by analyzing the metaphysical assumptions made in the conventional thinking), Jizang developed his sizhong erdi ("four levels of the two kinds of discourse"), which takes that distinction and adds metadistinctions on three more levels:

1. The assumption of existence is conventional, and the idea of nonexistence is authentic.
2. The commitment to a distinction between existence and nonexistence is now considered conventional, and the denial of this duality is authentic.
3. The distinction between committing to a distinction between existence and nonexistence is now conventional, and the denial of the difference between duality and non-duality is authentic.
4. All of these distinctions are deemed conventional, and the authentic discourse regards that any point of view cannot be said to be ultimately true, and is useful only so far as it is corrective in the above sense.

Thus, the attachment to any viewpoint is considered detrimental and is a cause of life's suffering. To repudiate the misleading finality of any viewpoint, on any level of discourse, is thus corrective and helps overcome destructive attachment.

== Selected works ==
- Dapin youyi (大品遊意; "Contemplation of the Mahāprajñāpāramitā Sūtra") Taishō no. 1696 in Vol. 34
- Jingang banruo shu (金剛般若疏; "Commentary on the Diamond Sūtra") Taishō no. 1699 in Vol. 34
- Renwang banruo jing shu (仁王般若經疏; "Commentary on the Prajñāpāramitā Sūtra for Humane Kings") Taishō no. 1707 in Vol. 34
- Fahua xuanlun (法華玄論; "Profound Discourse on the Lotus Sutra") Taishō no. 1720 in Vol. 35
- Fahua yishu (法華義疏; "Commentary on the Meaning of the Lotus Sutra") Taishō no. 1721 in Vol. 35
- Fahua youyi (法華遊意; "Contemplation of the Lotus Sutra") Taishō no. 1722 in Vol. 35
- Huayan youyi (華嚴遊意; "Contemplation of the Buddhāvataṃsaka Sūtra|Avataṃsaka Sūtra") Taishō no. 1731 in Vol. 37
- Shengman baoku (勝鬘寶窟; "Jewel Cave of the Śrīmālādevī Siṃhanāda Sūtra") Taishō no. 1744 in Vol. 38
- Wuliangshou jing yishu (無量壽經義疏; "Commentary on the Meaning of the Infinite Life Sūtra") Taishō no. 1746 in Vol. 38
- Guan wuliangshou jing yishu (觀無量壽經義疏; "Commentary on the Meaning of the Contemplation Sūtra") Taishō no. 1752 in Vol. 38
- Niepan jing youyi (涅槃經遊意; "Contemplation of the Mahāparinirvāṇa Sūtra") Taishō no. 1768 in Vol. 39
- Mile jing youyi (彌勒經遊意; "Contemplation of the Maitreya Sūtra") no. 1771 in Vol. 39
- Jingming xuanlun (淨名玄論; "Profound Discourse on the Vimalakīrtinirdeśa-sūtra") Taishō no. 1780 in Vol. 39
- Weimo jing yishu (維摩經義疏; "Commentary on the Meaning of the Vimalakīrtinirdeśa-sūtra") Taishō no. 1781 in Vol. 39
- Jingguangming jing shu (金光明經疏; "Commentary on the Golden Light Sutra") Taishō no. 1787 in Vol. 40
- Fahua lun shu (法華論疏; "Commentary on the Treatise on the Lotus Sutra") Taishō no. 1818 in Vol. 40
- Zhongguanlun shu (中觀論疏; "Commentary on the Mūlamadhyamakakārikā") Taishō no. 1824 in Vol. 42
- Shi er men lun shu (十二門論疏; "Commentary on the Twelve Gate Treatise) Taishō no. 1825 in Vol. 42
- Bailun shu (百論疏; "Commentary on the Śata Śāstra/Śataka") Taishō no. 1827 in Vol. 42
- Sanlun xuanyi (三論玄義; "Profound Meaning of the Three Treatises") Taishō no. 1852 in Vol. 45
- Dasheng xuanlun (大乘玄論; "Treatise on the Mystery of the Mahayana") Taishō no. 1853 in Vol. 45
- Erdi zhang (二諦章 "Essay on the Two Levels of Discourse") also called 二諦義 Taishō no. 1854 in Vol. 45
