= Da Zhidu Lun =

Encyclopedic Mahayana Buddhist text meant as a commentary

- Traditional Chinese: 《大智度論》
- Simplified Chinese: 《大智度论》
- Literal meaning: Treatise on the Great Wisdom
Transcriptions
Standard Mandarin
- Hanyu Pinyin: Dà zhìdù lùn
- Wade–Giles: Ta-chih-tu Lun

The Da Zhidu Lun (abbreviated DZDL; T.1509) or Treatise on the Great Wisdom (with reference to Prajñāpāramitā) is a large Mahāyāna Buddhist treatise and commentary on the Pañcaviṃśatisāhasrikā Prajñāpāramitā Sūtra (The Sūtra of Transcendental Wisdom in Twenty-five Thousand Lines). The original Sanskrit title has been reconstructed as both Mahāprajñāpāramitopadeśa and Mahāprajñāpāramitāśāstra.

The Da Zhidu Lun is an encyclopedic compendium or summa of Mahayana Buddhist doctrine, which, according to Richard McBride II is "perhaps the single most important document for understanding Buddhism in medieval China...there is nothing in Indian Mahayana literature that remotely approaches the authority this work enjoyed in medieval Chinese Buddhism."

The Da Zhidu Lun was translated into Chinese by the Kuchean monk Kumārajīva and his Chinese team from 402 to 406 CE. The colophon to this work claims it is written by the Buddhist philosopher Nāgārjuna (c. 2nd century), but various scholars such as Étienne Lamotte have questioned this attribution. According to Hans-Rudolf Kantor, this work was "fundamental for the development of the Chinese Sanlun, Tiantai, Huayan, and Chan schools."

== History ==
The DZDL survives only in the Chinese translation of 100 scrolls made by the Kuchean monk Kumārajīva (344–413 CE) from 402 to 406 CE. According to the primary sources, the Indic text consisted of 100,000 gāthās (lines), or 3,200,000 Sanskrit syllables, which was condensed by Kumārajīva by two-thirds to obtain the 100 scrolls of the Chinese translation. Kumārajīva translated the first 34 scrolls in full, and abridged the rest of the material. It was translated by Kumārajīva, working together with his student Sengrui, who "stopped writing, argued for the right translation," and "checked his translation against the original for the entire day" as well as with the Qin emperor Yao Xing (366–416 CE).

The DZDL became a central text for the East Asian Sanlun ( J. Sanron) or Madhyamaka school and also influenced all the major schools of Chinese Buddhism. The DZDL acted as a kind of Mahāyāna encyclopedia for East Asian Buddhist thought, similar to the status of the Abhisamayalamkara in Tibetan Buddhism.

Traditionally, it is held that the text is by the Indian Madhyamaka philosopher Nagarjuna. Against the traditional attribution of the work to Nagarjuna, Étienne Lamotte as well as Paul Demiéville, concluded that the author must have been a Buddhist monk of the Sarvāstivāda or Mulasarvāstivāda school from Northwest India, learned in Abhidharma, who later converted to Mahāyāna and Madhyamaka and then composed "a voluminous exegetical treatise which is like a Mahāyāna reply to the Sarvāstivādin Abhidharma". This is because the Abhidharma and Vinaya material found in this text coincides with that of the north Indian Sarvāstivāda tradition. This is a widely accepted view among modern scholars. Lamotte also remarked on the internal evidence of the text which shows that its author was likely from a region that was within the Kushan Empire.

Hikata Ryusho however argues that there is an ancient nucleus of material in this text that could be attributed by Nagarjuna (as well as a large amount of later accretions). R. Hikata argued that while a part of the text was by Nagarjuna, it also included many "additions or insertions by Kumārajīva." The Chinese scholar Yin Shun meanwhile, argues for the traditional attribution to Nagarjuna. In a recent study, Po-kan Chou has argued that the DZDL is a product of the editorship of Sengrui (352?-436?), Kumārajīva's student, co-translator and amanuensis.

== Content ==
The text is primarily Mahayana and explains basic Mahayana doctrines such as Prajñāpāramitā, and the other bodhisattva paramitas, but also includes much Sarvastivada Abhidharma, Jataka and early Buddhist content. As noted by Lamotte, "the Treatise cites, at length or in extracts, about a hundred sūtras of the Lesser Vehicle; the majority are borrowed from the Āgama collections". It also cites various Mahayana sutras, such as the Lotus Sutra and the Vimalakirti Sutra, the Dasabhumika Sutra, Gandavyuha Sutra, as well as various Jataka stories and Avadana literature. According to Akira Hirawaka, "The arguments of the Ta-chih-tu lun, are primarily directed against the Vaibhasikas of the Sarvastivadin School."

The DZDL contains 90 chapters (pǐn) in 100 rolls (juàn). It comprises two series of chapters, according to Lamotte the first series of 52 chapters (Taisho. 1509, p. 57c-314b) "appears to be an integral version of the Indian original" while the second series of 89 chapters (Taisho. 1509, p. 314b-756c) seems to be an abridgement.

The content of the first series, which has been translated by Etienne Lamotte (Fr.) and Karma Migme Chodron (Eng.) is as follows:

- Chapters 1 to 15 comment on the prologue or nidana of the Pañcaviṃśatisāhasrikā Prajñāpāramitā sutra (Taisho, T VIII, no. 223).
- Chapters 16 to 30 provide an extensive commentary on a short paragraph of the sutra which focuses on the six transcendent virtues or pāramitās.
- Chapters 31 to 42, according to Lamotte: "this part, the most technical and without a doubt the most interesting part of the Traité, has as its subject the practices forming the Path of Nirvāṇa and the attributes of the Buddhas." This includes the thirty-seven bodhipākṣikadharmas, the "eight complementary classes of dharmas of the Path" (such as the three samadhis and four dhyanas) and "Six other classes of dharmas of the Path" (such as the Nine aṣubhasaṃjñās and the Eight anusmṛtis). For each of these topics, the views of Sarvastivada Abhidharma are explained alongside the views Prajñāpāramitā which often critique the Abhidharma understanding. The Agamas are also cited in these explanations.
- Chapters 42 to 48 discuss the Bodhisattva vehicle, bodhicitta, merit, the abhijñas, emptiness (taught in the schema of the "eighteen emptinesses" 十八空), Madhyamaka, and the practice (śikṣā) of Prajñāpāramitā.
- Chapters 49 to 52 discuss further topics such as the vows of a bodhisattva (in two sets of 24 vows and 38 vows) as well as causality, Dharmata, the divine eye (divyacakṣu), and the four great elements.

== Translations ==
One third of this work was translated by Etienne Lamotte as Le Traité de la Grande Vertu de Sagesse. An English translation from Lamotte's French was completed by Gelongma Karma Migme Chodron as "The Treatise on the Great Virtue of Wisdom".

Bhiksu Dharmamitra has also translated sections of this work into English, including chapters 17-30 and a collection of 130 stories and anecdotes extracted from the text.

The Fo Guang Shan International Translation Center is currently in the process of producing a complete translation of the text, under the title The Great Perfection of Wisdom Treatise.

== See also ==
- Fangsheng pond, first mentioned in additions to the DZDL
