= East Asian Mādhyamaka =

Buddhist tradition in East Asia which represents the Indian Madhyamaka

East Asian Madhyamaka is the Buddhist tradition in East Asia which represents the Indian Madhyamaka (Chung-kuan) system of thought. In Chinese Buddhism, these are often referred to as the Sanlun (Ch. 三論宗, Jp. Sanron, "Three Treatise") school, also known as the "emptiness school" (K'ung Tsung), although they may not have been an independent sect. The three principal texts of the school are the Middle Treatise (Zhong lun), the Twelve Gate Treatise (Shiermen lun), and the Hundred Treatise (Bai lun). They were first transmitted to China during the early 5th century by the Buddhist monk Kumārajīva (344−413) in the Eastern Jin Dynasty. The school and its texts were later transmitted to Korea and Japan. The leading thinkers of this tradition are Kumārajīva's disciple Sengzhao (Seng-chao; 374−414), and the later Jizang (Chi-tsang; 549−623). Their major doctrines include emptiness (k'ung), the middle way (chung-tao), the twofold truth (erh-t'i) and "the refutation of erroneous views as the illumination of right views" (p'o-hsieh-hsien-cheng).

== History in China ==
=== Early period ===
The name Sanlun derives from the fact that its doctrinal basis is formed by three principal Madhyamaka texts composed by the Indian Buddhist philosophers Nāgārjuna (Longshu, 龍樹), and Āryadeva, which were then translated into Chinese by the Kuchean monk Kumārajīva (pinyin: Jiūmóluóshí) and his team of Chinese translators in Chang'an's Xiaoyao garden.

These three foundational texts are:

- The Middle Treatise (Ch. 中論, pinyin: Zhonglun, T. 1564; Skt. Madhyamakaśāstra), comprising Nāgārjuna's Mūlamadhyamakakārikā ("Fundamental Verses on the Middle Way") alongside a commentary by *Vimalākṣa / *Piṅgala (Ch. 青目, pinyin: Qingmu).
- The Treatise on the Twelve Gates (Ch. 十二門論, pinyin: Shiermenlun, T. 1568), allegedly Nāgārjuna's *Dvādaśadvāraśāstra, also reconstructed as *Dvādaśamukhaśāstra or as *Dvādaśanikāyaśāstra.
- The Hundred(-Verse) Treatise (Ch. 百論, pinyin: Bailun, T. 1569; Skt. Śatakaśāstra, or Śataśāstra), consisting of a commentary by a certain master Vasu on some verses by Āryadeva.

Sometimes a fourth text is added, changing the collection's title to the "Four Treatises" (Ch. 四論, pinyin: Silun):

- "Commentary on the Great Perfection of Wisdom" (Ch. 大智度論, pinyin: Dazhidulun, T. 1509; Skt. Mahāprajñāpāramitopadeśa). Attributed to Nāgārjuna, but disputed by some modern scholars.

Another text translated by Kumārajīva and his team, the Satyasiddhi shastra (Ch'eng-shih lun), while not being a Madhyamaka text per se, was influential in the study of Chinese Madhyamaka, since it also taught the emptiness of dharmas.

Sengrui was one of Kumārajīva's main disciples—he aided in the translation project of numerous texts, including the Middle Treatise and the Pañcaviṃśatisāhasrikā Prajñāpāramitā Sūtra. Six days after Kumārajīva arrived in Chang'an, Sengrui requested that he translate a meditation manual now understood to be the Zuochan sanmei jing (Sutra of sitting dhyāna samādhi, Taisho 15 no. 614). Sengrui refers to this manual as "Chanyao" 禪要 in the preface he wrote for it: the Guanzhong-chu chanjing xu (Preface to the Meditation Manual Translated in the Guanzhong Area, T. 55: 65 a–b) (dates uncertain).

Another of Kumārajīva's main disciples, Sengzhao continued to promote Madhyamaka teachings, and wrote several works from this standpoint, his main one being the Zhao Lun. Two of the essays in this work (Prajña Is Without Dichotomizing Knowledge and Nirvana Is Without Conceptualization) follow a similar debate format to Nagarjuna's MMK. Sengzhao is often seen as the founder of the Sanlun school proper. His philosophy drew from various sources, including the three treatises, Mahayana sutras such as the Vimalakirti sutra, as well as Taoist works such as Lao-tzu, Chuang-tzu and Neo-Daoist "Mystery Learning" (xuanxue 玄学) texts. His use of Taoist influenced paradoxes made him a favorite in the Chan school who considers him a patriarch.

Sengzhao saw the central problem in understanding emptiness as the discriminatory activity of prapañca. According to Sengzhao, delusion arises through a dependent relationship between phenomenal things, naming, thought and reification and correct understanding lies outside of words and concepts. Thus, while emptiness is the lack of intrinsic self in all things, this emptiness is not itself an absolute and cannot be grasped by the conceptual mind, it can be only be realized through non-conceptual wisdom (prajña).

=== Tang era and Jizang ===
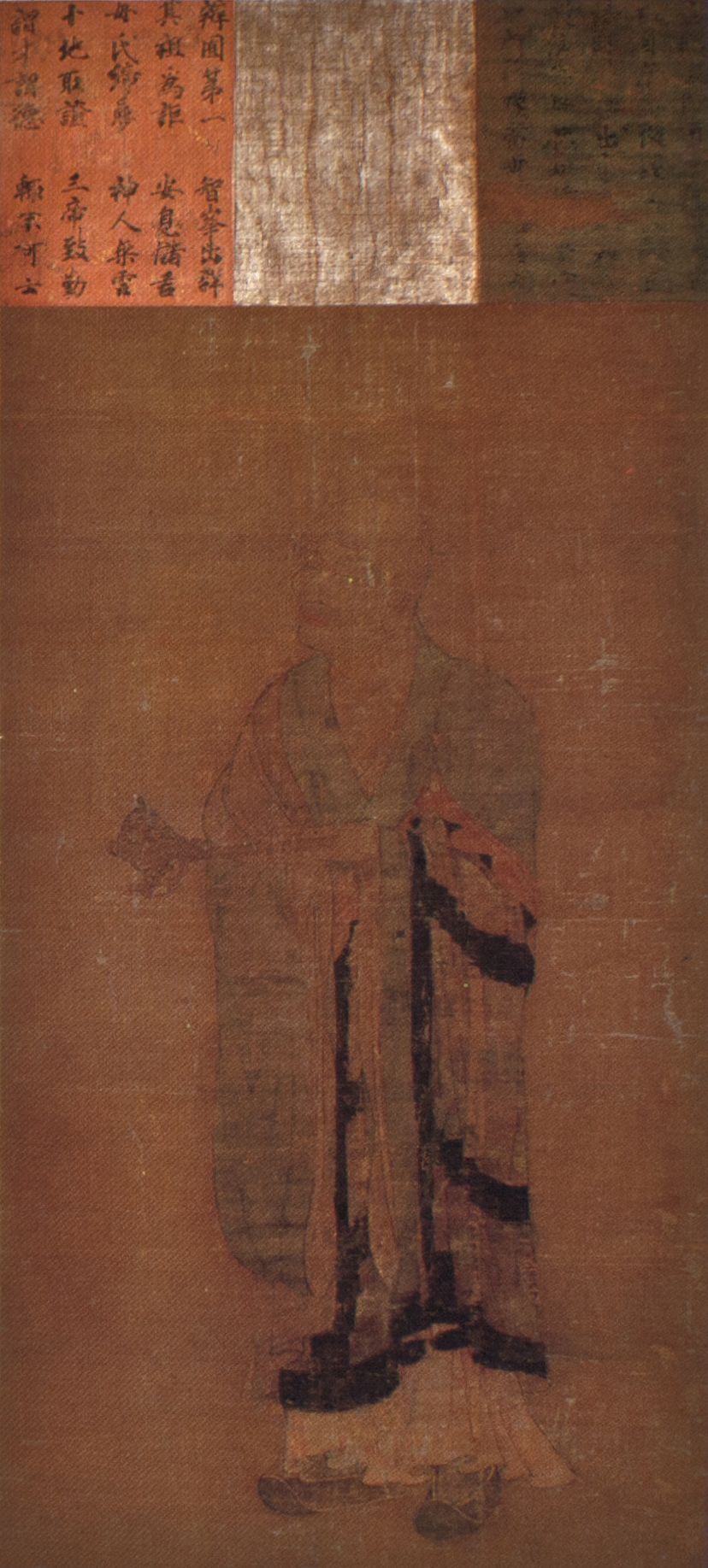
Jizang, 13th century, Todaiji, Nara, Japan

An important Sanlun figure during the Tang dynasty was Falang (507–581). He studied widely under various teachers, including the Madhyamaka master Sengchuan (470–528) and eventually received an imperial decree to reside at Hsing Huang monastery in Jiankang, where he continued to give sermons on the Four Treatises for twenty five years.

The most influential Sanlun scholar of the Tang was Fa-lang's pupil Jizang (549–623), a prolific writer who composed commentaries on these three treatises. One of his most famous works is the Erdi Yi (二諦意), or "Meaning of the Two Truths", referring to the conventional and ultimate truths. In one passage of the Erdi Yi, Jizang cites Falang, and argues that the four treatises have the same goal, "to explain the two truths and manifest the doctrine of non-duality".

Jizang criticized numerous Chinese Buddhists for their unwarranted metaphysical assumptions. He ultimately rejects all metaphysical assertions of being and non-being as dogmatic conceptual confusions. Thus according to Hsueh-Lu Cheng, for Jizang:

True wisdom (prajña) is the abandonment of all views. Chi-tsang argues that metaphysical speculation of Being and Nothingness is a disease (ping). It is the root of all erroneous or perverted views. The cure of the disease lies not so much in developing a new metaphysical theory as in understanding the proper nature and function of human conceptualization and language. Chi-tsang, following Nagarjuna, claims that the very language men create and use plays a trick on them and destroys their "eyes of wisdom." Enlightened men should discard conceptualization so as to avoid being taken in by this trick. Emptiness, for Chi-tsang, is a medicine (yao) for curing the "philosophical disease".

Jizang called his philosophical method "deconstructing what is misleading and revealing what is corrective". He insisted that one must never settle on any particular viewpoint or perspective but constantly reexamine one's formulations to avoid sedimentations of thought and behavior.

In addition to popularizing Madhyamaka, Jizang also wrote commentaries on the Mahāyāna sūtras such as the Lotus Sūtra, the Vimalakīrti Nirdeśa Sūtra and Tathāgatagarbha teachings.

=== Influence on Chan ===
After Jizang, the school declined considerably, though its texts remained influential for other traditions such as Tiantai and Chan Buddhism. In, Chan (Zen), Nagarjuna is seen as one of the patriarchs of the school and thus its key figures such as Huineng must have been familiar with the four treatises. According to Hsueh-li Cheng, "Zen masters such as Niu-t'ou fa-yung (594–657) and Nan-ch'uan P'u-yuan (748–834) were San-Iun Buddhists before they became Zen masters." Furthermore, major Sanlun tenets such as the negation of conceptualization, the rejection of all views, and the twofold truth were adopted by Zen, thus Hsueh-li Cheng concludes that "in many respects Zen appears to be a practical application of Madhyamika thought."

=== Modern Chinese Buddhism ===
In the early part of the 20th century, the laymen Yang Wenhui and Ouyang Jian (Ch. 歐陽漸) (1871–1943) promoted Buddhist learning in China, and the general trend was for an increase in studies of Buddhist traditions such as Yogācāra, Madhyamaka, and the Huayan school.

A major influential figure in the modern Chinese study of Madhyamaka is Yinshun (印順導師, 1906–2005). Yinshun applied his study of the Chinese Agamas to Madhyamaka, and argued that the works of Nagarjuna were "the inheritance of the conceptualisation of dependent arising as proposed in the Agamas". Yinshun saw the writings of Nagarjuna as the correct Buddhadharma while considering the writings of the Sanlun school as being corrupted due to their synthesizing of the Tathagata-garbha doctrine into Madhyamaka.

While he was seen among his colleagues as a Sanlun scholar, he himself did not claim such direct affiliation:

In Zhōngguān jīnlùn (中觀今論 Modern Discussion on the Madhyamaka) [pg. 18, 24], I stated: "Amongst my teachers and friends, I am seen as a scholar of either the Three Treatise (三論 sanlun) or the Emptiness schools", although I "certainly do have great affinities with the fundamental and essential doctrines of the emptiness school", however, "I do not belong to any particular school of thought within the emptiness schools".

Many modern Chinese Mādhyamaka scholars such as Li Zhifu, Yang Huinan and Lan Jifu have been students of Yinshun.

== History in Japan ==
The school was known in Japan as Sanron (三論宗) and was introduced around 625 by the Korean Goguryeo monk Hyegwan (Jp. = Ekan 慧灌) who resided at Gangōji Temple. Prince Shōtoku is known to have had two Buddhist mentors from the Sanron school. Ekan is also known for introducing the Jōjitsu (Satyasiddhi) school to Japan and the Satyasiddhi system was taught as a supplement, together with Madhyamaka, in Japanese Sanron.

During the Heian period, an important Sanron figure was master Chiko (709–781), whose commentary on the Heart Sutra became a classic work of Heian Buddhist scholarship and the most authoritative commentary on the Heart Sutra in the early Heian. This commentary criticized the Hosso (Yogacara) school's interpretation of the Heart Sutra, promoted the Heart Sutra as a text of definitive meaning (nītārtha) while also drawing on the work of Jizang.

This school was later overshadowed by other Japanese schools such as Tendai and Zen.

== Notes ==
=== References ===
- Ven. Yin Shun (1998). The Way to Buddhahood: Instructions from a Modern Chinese Master. Wisdom Publications. ISBN 0-86171-133-5.
- Ducor, Jérôme et Isler, Henry W. : Jizang 吉藏, Le Sens des arcanes des Trois Traités (Sanlun xuanyi / Sanron gengi 三論玄義), contribution à l'étude du Mādhyamika dans le bouddhisme d'Extrême-Orient; Genève, Librairie Droz, 2022; 416 pp., bibliographie (ISBN 978-2-600-06383-8)
- Gard, Richard (1957). Why did the Madhyamika decline?, Indogaku Bukkyogaku Kenkyu 5 (2), 10–14
- Brian Bocking (1995). Nagarjuna in China: A Translation of the Middle Treatise (The Edwin Mellon Press).
- Ming-Wood Liu (1997). Madhyamaka Thought in China (Sinica Leidensia, 30), Brill Academic Pub. ISBN 9004099840
- Robert Magliola (2004). "Nagarjuna and Chi-tsang on the Value of 'This World': A Reply to Kuang-ming Wu's Critique of Indian and Chinese Madhyamika Buddhism." Journal of Chinese Philosophy 31 (4), 505–516. (Demonstrates Jizang neither denigrates 'this world' nor deviates from what was mainstream Indian Madhyamikan doctrine.)
