= Buddhasvamin (monk) =

Buddhasvāmin was a Sarvastivadan Buddhist monk and famous scholar from the kingdom of Kucha. During part of the 4th century CE, he presideded over all Buddhist temples and nunneries in Kucha.

Buddhasvāmin's disciple Kumārajīva later became an adherent of the Mahayana teaching, and later moved to Chang'an, then capital of China, where he became one of Buddhism's most noted translators.
