= White Horse Pagoda, Dunhuang =

Coordinates: 40°07′50.85″N 94°38′54.79″E

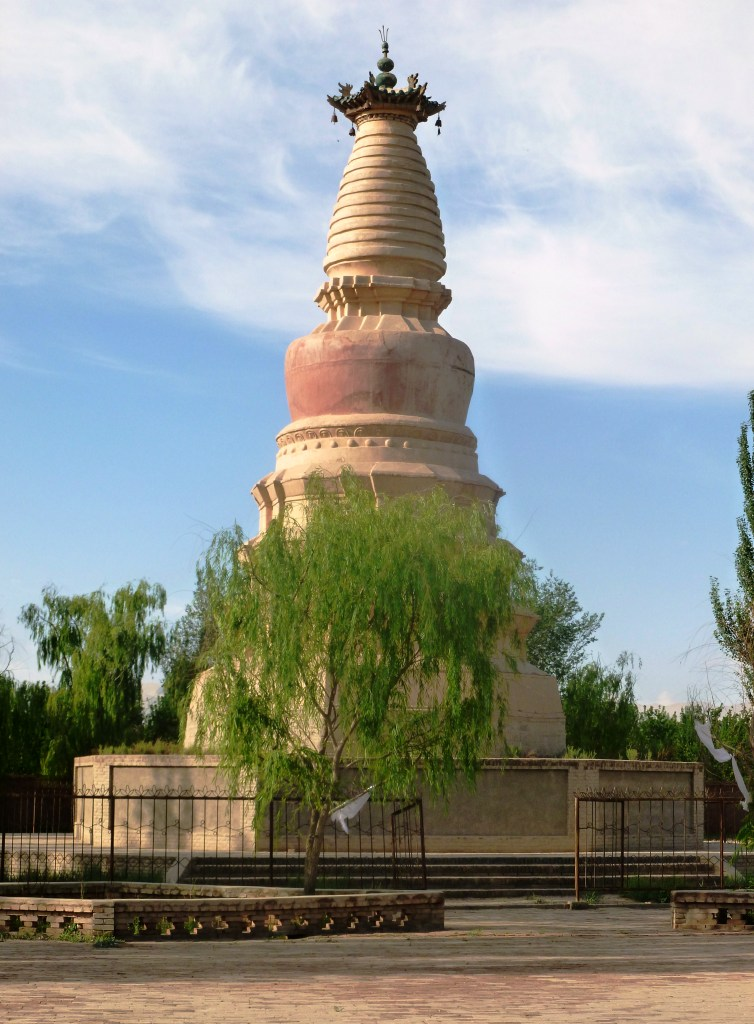
- White Horse Pagoda

Religion
- Affiliation: Mahayana Buddhism

Location
- Location: Dunhuang, Gansu Province, China
- Country: China
- Interactive map of White Horse Pagoda, Dunhuang

Architecture
- Completed: circa 384 CE

The White Horse Pagoda (simplified Chinese: 白马塔; traditional Chinese: 白馬塔; pinyin: Báimǎ Tǎ, Wade-Giles: Paima tʻa), in Dunhuang, Gansu, China, was built to commemorate Tianliu, the white horse of the Buddhist monk Kumārajīva, which carried Buddhist scriptures all the way from Kucha to Dunhuang in China c. 384 CE.

The pagoda is located about 2 km southwest of the centre of Dunhuang city. It was repaired in the Daoguang era (1821-1851) and again in 1992. It is 12 metres (39 feet) high and 7 metres (23 feet) in diameter and consists of 9 levels in total. The exterior is built of adobe bricks and is filled with grass and mud mixed with lime. The base is in the form of an eight-spoked wheel, the 1st level has four sides, while levels 2 to 4 have folding corners, the 5th level is decorated with upturned lotuses, the 6th is in the shape of an overturned bowl, the 7th level is wheel-shaped, while the 8th level has a hexagonal plate at the top of the pagoda with big wind-bells hanging on every corner. Above that are three metal balls surmounted by a trident. Local people say the chime of the bells are an echo of the neighing of the horse.

== History ==
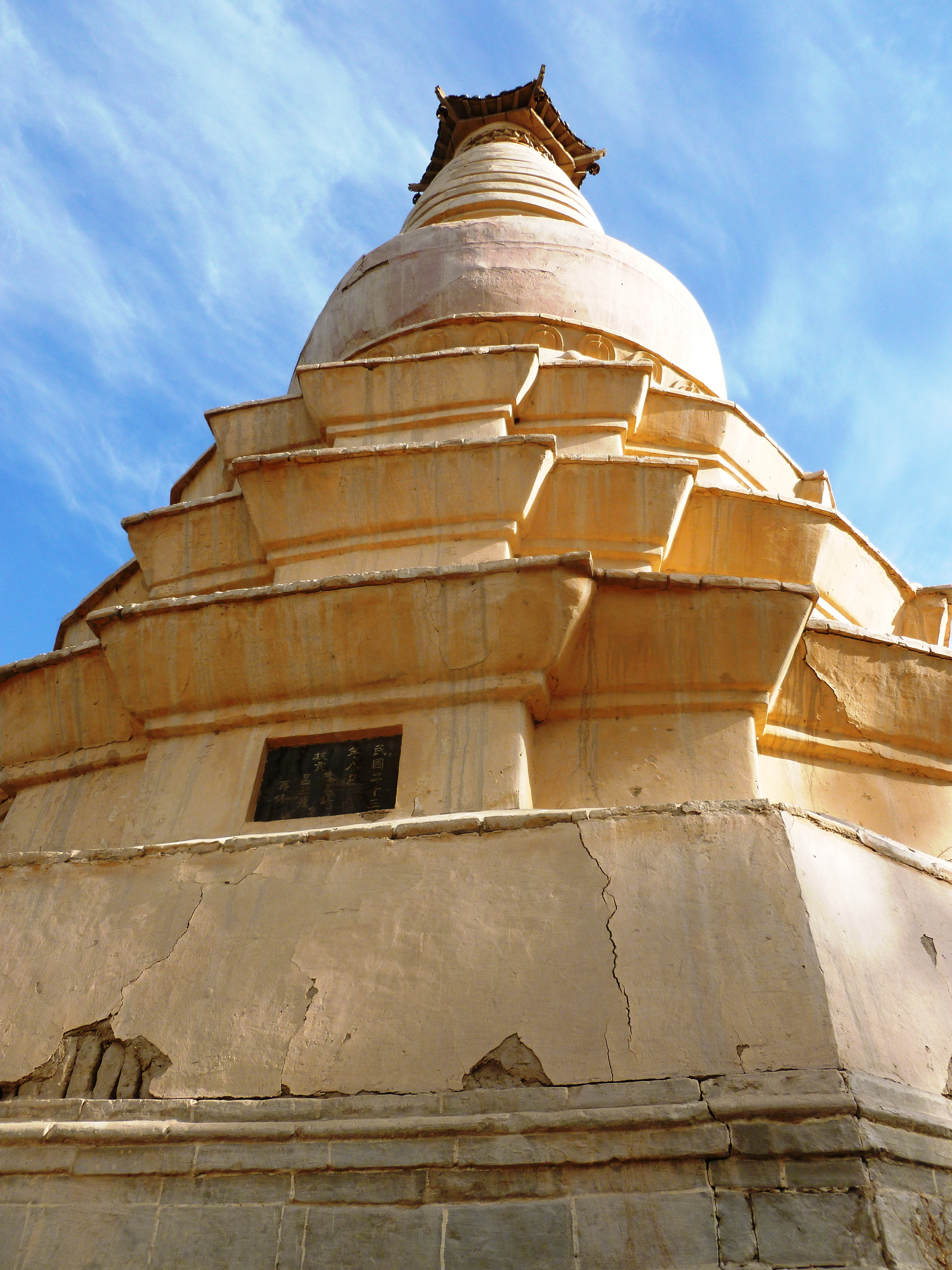
Showing construction of pagoda

Kumārajīva, a revered monk and translator, was born in the oasis city-state of Kucha, the son of a Kuchean princess and a Kashmiri Brahmin. The horse found passages through high mountains, across raging rivers, and water when needed.

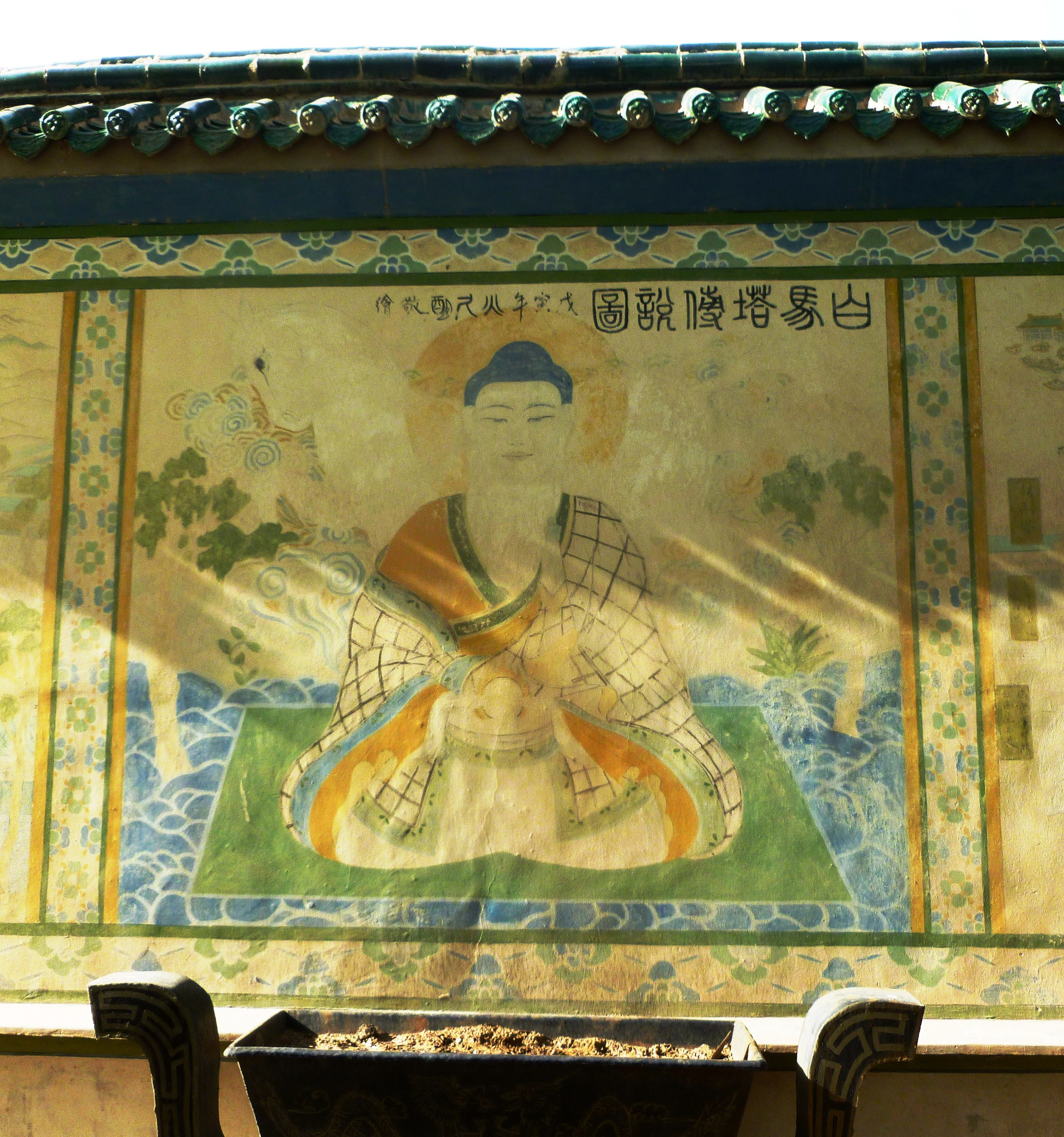
Wall painting and incense brazier at pagoda

According to legend, when Kumārajīva reached the ancient city of Shazhou (Dunhuang) he stopped for several days at Puguang Temple to preach the scriptures. Just before he was due to leave, Tianliu became sick and died shortly after. He was devastated by the death of his faithful companion and built this unique nine-storied pagoda containing relics of the Buddha:

"Kumārajīva was very sad. He erected a sacrificial altar for the white horse and performed Buddhist rites at it for nine days. In the courtyard of Puguang Temple he built the White Horse Pagoda."

The Diamond Sutra (Sanskrit: Vajracchdikāprajñāpāramitāsūtra or 'Diamond Cutter Perfection of Wisdom Sutra'), one of the scriptures Kumārajīva brought to China, was first translated into Chinese by him in 402. It became "the most widely-read, recited and copied version of the sutra in China, in spite of the fact that later translations were made by several others, including the pilgrim monk Xuanzang." A printed copy of this sutra, found at the Mogao Caves near Dunhuang in 1910, is dated in the year 868 CE, making it the world's oldest dated printed book. It has recently been restored at the British Library, an exacting process that took seven years.

== See also ==
- Horse in Chinese mythology
