= Hyegwan =

Japanese name
- Kanji: 慧灌
- Hiragana: えかん
Transcriptions
- Revised Hepburn: Ekan

Korean name
- Hangul: 혜관
- Hanja: 慧灌
Transcriptions
- Revised Romanization: Hyegwan
- McCune–Reischauer: Hyegwan

Hyegwan (Japanese: Ekan (慧灌, year of birth and death unknown; 7th century CE) was a priest who came across the sea from Goguryeo to Japan in the Asuka period. He is known for introducing the Chinese Buddhist school of Sanlun to Japan.

Hyegwan studied under Jizang and learned Sanron. In 625 (the 33rd year of Empress Suiko), he was dispatched to Japan by an order of King Yeongnyu of Goguryeo, and became the founding patriarch of Japanese Sanron. He lived at Gangō-ji (元興寺 Gangō temple) by an Imperial command. However, Gyōnen wrote that Hyegwan did not lecture on Sanron or start the Japanese tradition, although he "held the jade" (i.e., possessed knowledge of the teachings).
