= Kumārajīva =

Kuchan Buddhist monk and translator (344–413)

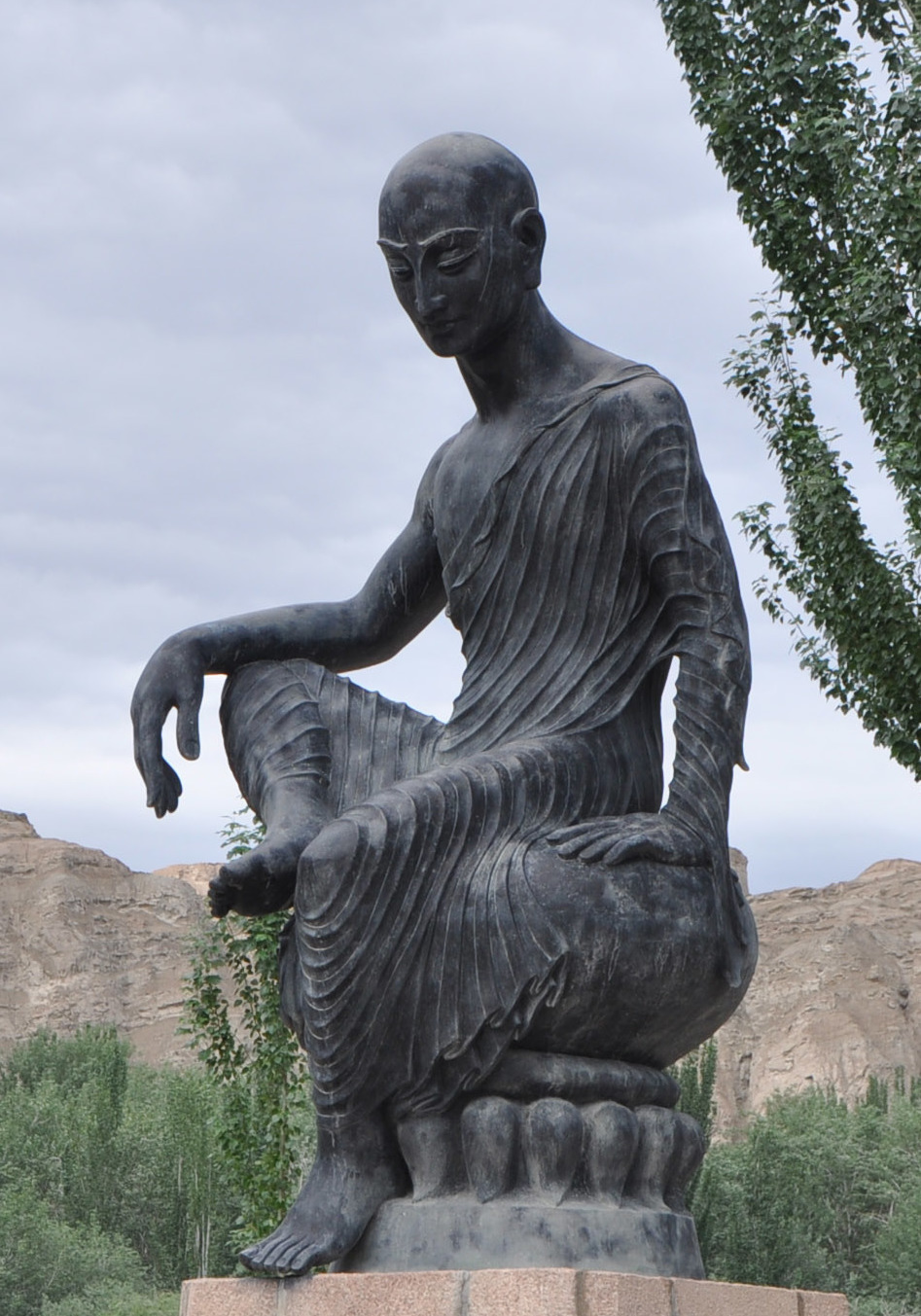
- The Statue of Kumārajīva in front of the Kizil Caves in Kuqa County, Xinjiang, China
- Born: 344 CE; Kingdom of Kucha (now Kuqa, China)
- Died: 413 CE (aged 68-69); Chang'an, Later Qin (now Xi'an, China)
- Occupations: Buddhist monk, scholar, translator, and philosopher
- Known for: Translation of Buddhist texts written in Sanskrit to Chinese, founder of the Sanlun school of Mahayana Buddhism
- Parent(s): Kumārāyana, Jīva

Kumārajīva traditional Chinese: 鳩摩羅什; simplified Chinese: 鸠摩罗什; pinyin: Jiūmóluóshí; Wade–Giles: Chiu^{¹} mo^{²} lo^{²} shih^{²}, 344–413 CE) was a Buddhist monk, scholar, missionary and translator from the Kingdom of Kucha (present-day Aksu Prefecture, Xinjiang, China). Kumārajīva is seen as one of the greatest translators of Chinese Buddhism and a pivotal figure in the development of literary Buddhist Chinese. According to Lu Cheng, Kumarajiva's translations are "unparalleled either in terms of translation technique or degree of fidelity".

Kumārajīva first studied teachings of the Sarvastivadin schools, later studied under Buddhasvāmin, and finally became an adherent of Mahayana Buddhism, studying the Mādhyamaka doctrine of Nāgārjuna. After mastering the Chinese language, Kumārajīva settled as a translator and scholar in Chang'an (c. 401 CE) under the patronage of the Later Qin dynasty during the Sixteen Kingdoms period. He was the head of a team of translators which included his amanuensis Sengrui. This team was responsible for the translation of many Sanskrit Buddhist texts into Chinese.

Kumārajīva also introduced the Madhyamaka school of Buddhist philosophy into China which would later be called Sanlun (the "Three Treatise school").

== Life ==
=== Early life ===
Kumārajīva was born in 344 CE in the Kingdom of Kucha – one of the Tocharian-speaking city-states of the Tarim Basin. His father was an Indian monk called Kumārāyana, who was probably from Kashmir or Gandhāra, and his mother, Jīva, was a member of the Kuchean royal family.

Himself an eminent Buddhist monk, Kumārāyana endeavoured to journey from his native Kashmir to China to spread his Buddhist teachings. After crossing the Pamir Mountains, Kumārāyana stopped in Kucha, where he stayed as a guest of the king. The king of Kucha was so impressed with Kumārāyana's ideas that the king proposed the marriage of his younger sister Jīva (also known as Jīvaka), a Kuchan princess and herself a devout Buddhist, to Kumārāyana. Kumārāyana and Jīva both acquiesced to this marriage. It was therefore that Kumārajīva's father Kumārāyana settled in Kucha, became the royal priest, met Kumārajīva's mother Jīva who influenced both his own subsequent Buddhist studies and later those of their son, and thereafter begat Kumārajīva.

When Kumārajīva was just seven, his mother Jīva joined the Tsio-li nunnery, north of Kucha. Beginning at the age of nine, Kumārajīva studied the Agamas and the Sarvastivada Abhidharma under masters in North India, Kashmir, and Kucha: all centers of Sarvastivada monasticism and scholarship. He later converted to and studied Mahayana under the Kashmirian Buddhayaśas in Kashgar.

In Kucha at the age of 20, Kumārajīva received full monastic ordination. Around this time he also began to study the Sarvastivada Vinaya and the Madhyamaka philosophy. Over his early life, Kumārajīva became a famous figure in Buddhism, known for his breadth of studies and skill in debate.

=== Capture, imprisonment and release ===
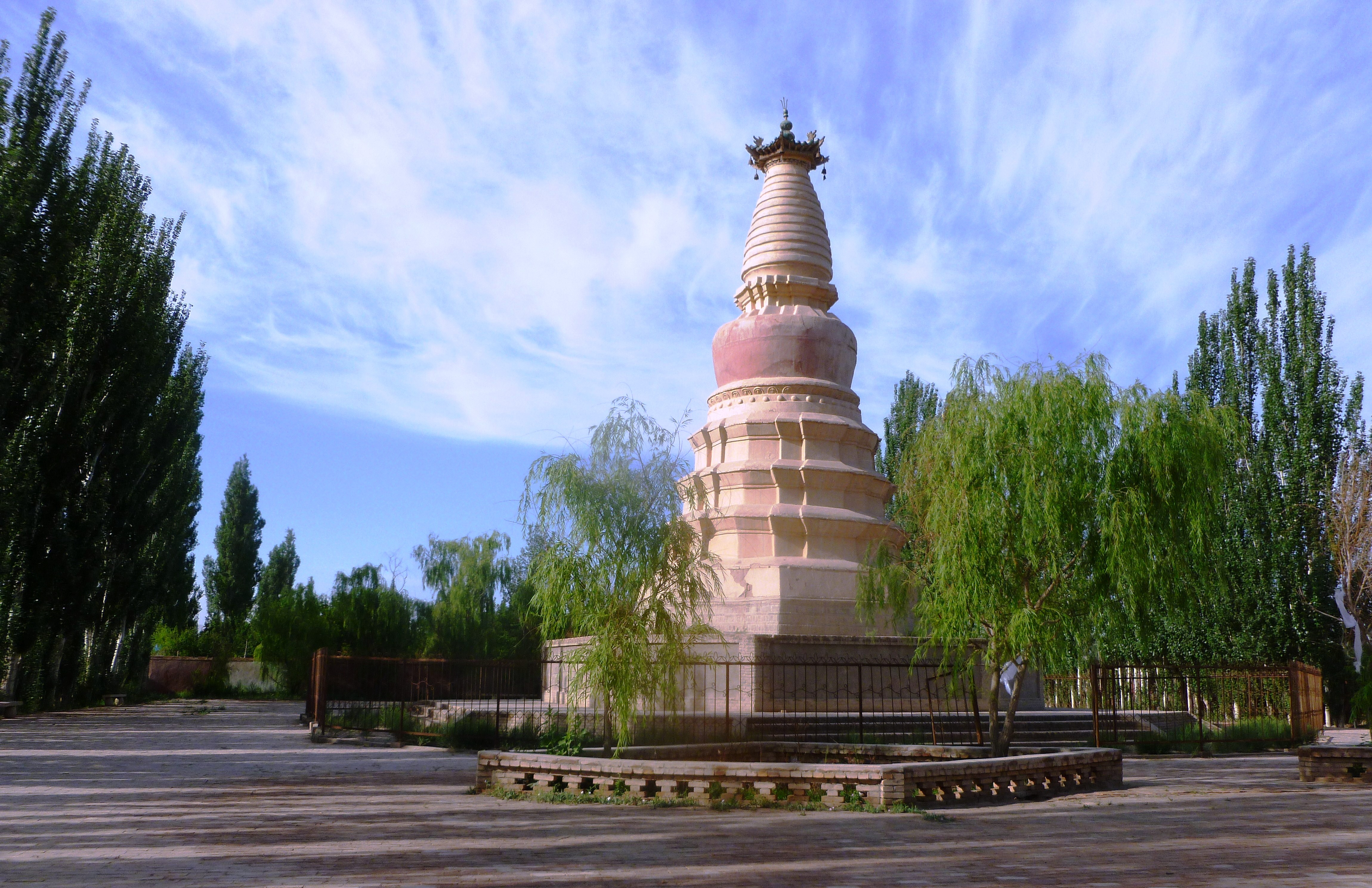
White Horse Pagoda, Dunhuang, commemorating Kumarajiva's white horse which carried the scriptures to China, c. 384 CE

In 379 CE, Kumārajīva's fame reached China when a Chinese Buddhist monk named Seng Jun visited Kucha and described Kumārajīva's abilities. Efforts were then made by Emperor Fu Jian (苻堅) of the Former Qin Dynasty to bring Kumārajīva to the Qin capital of Chang'an. To do this, his general Lü Guang was dispatched with an army in order to conquer Kucha and return with Kumārajīva. Fu Jian is recorded as telling his general, "Send me Kumārajīva as soon as you conquer Kucha." However, when Fu Jian's main army at the capital was defeated, his general Lü Guang declared his own state and became a warlord in 386 CE, and had Kumārajīva captured when he was around 40 years old. Being a non-Buddhist, Lü Guang had Kumārajīva imprisoned for many years, essentially as booty. During this time, it is thought that Kumārajīva became familiar with the Chinese language. Kumārajīva was also coerced by Lü into marrying the Kucha King's daughter, and so he was forced to give up his monk's vows.

After the Yao family of Later Qin overthrew the previous ruler Fu Jian, the ruler Yao Xing made repeated pleas to the warlords of the Lü family to free Kumārajīva and send him east to Chang'an. When the Lü family would not free Kumārajīva from their hostage, an exasperated Yao Xing had armies dispatched to Liangzhou in order to defeat the warlords of the Lü family and to have Kumārajīva brought back to them. Finally the armies of Emperor Yao succeeded in defeating the Lü family, and Kumārajīva was brought east to the capital of Chang'an in 401 CE.

=== Chang'an and translation work ===
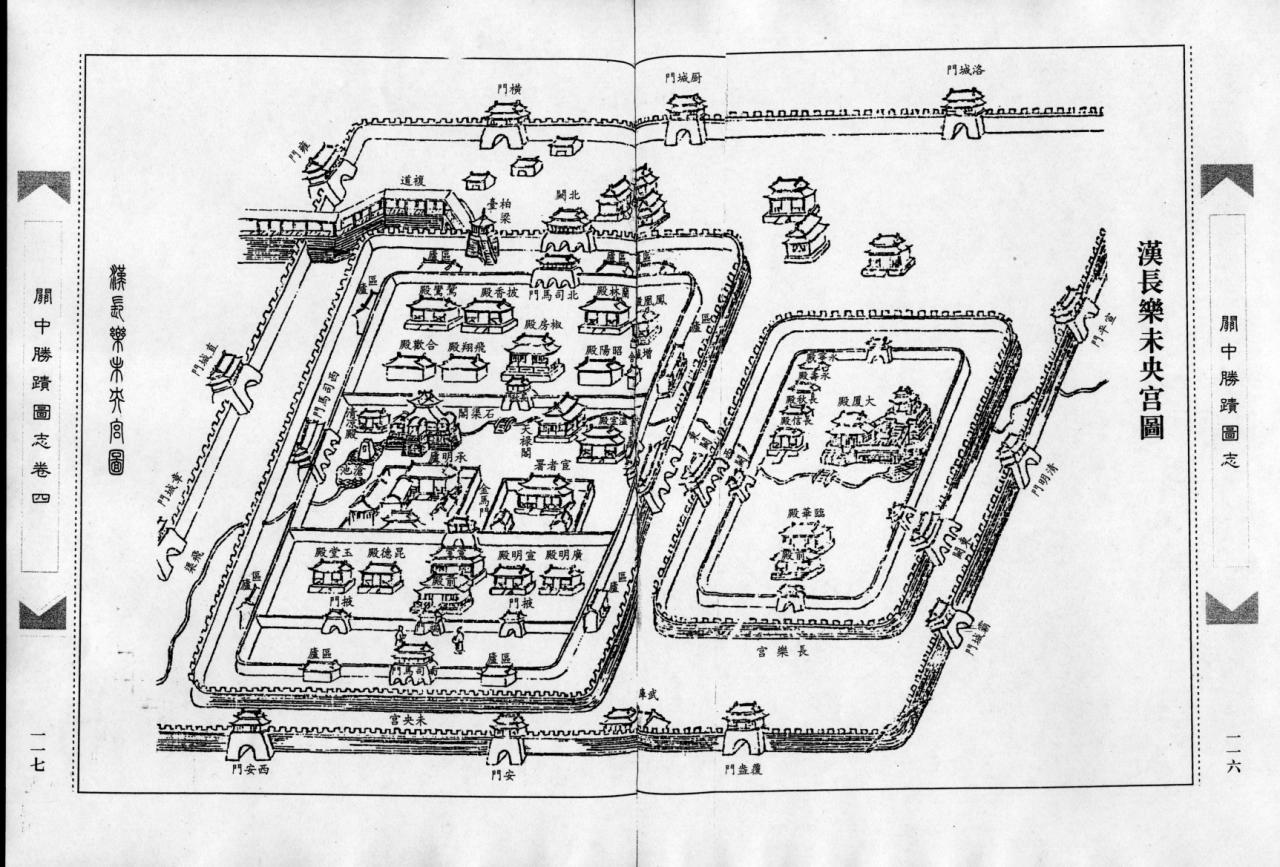
Brief map of Han Chang'an painted in Qing dynasty

At Chang'an, Kumārajīva was introduced to the emperor Yao Xing, the court, and the Buddhist leaders. He became a famous and well respected in China, being given the title of "National Preceptor" (guoshi). At Chang'an, Kumārajīva led a court sponsored translation team of scholars who worked on translating numerous Sanskrit Buddhist texts into the Chinese language. Yao Xing looked upon him as his own teacher, and many young and old Chinese Buddhists flocked to him, learning both from his direct teachings and through his translation bureau activities at the Xiaoyao Gardens where daily sessions were held (attended by over a thousand monks). Within a dozen years, Kumārajīva's translation bureau had translated about thirty five sutras in 294 scrolls. His translations are still in use today in Chinese Buddhism. Kumarajiva had four main disciples who worked on his team: Daosheng (竺道生), Sengzhao (僧肇), Daorong (道融), and Sengrui (僧睿). According to Paul Williams, Mahāprajñāpāramitopadeśa, a text translated by him, also has a clear association with the Vaibhāṣikas (Sarvāstivādins).

== Scholarly work ==
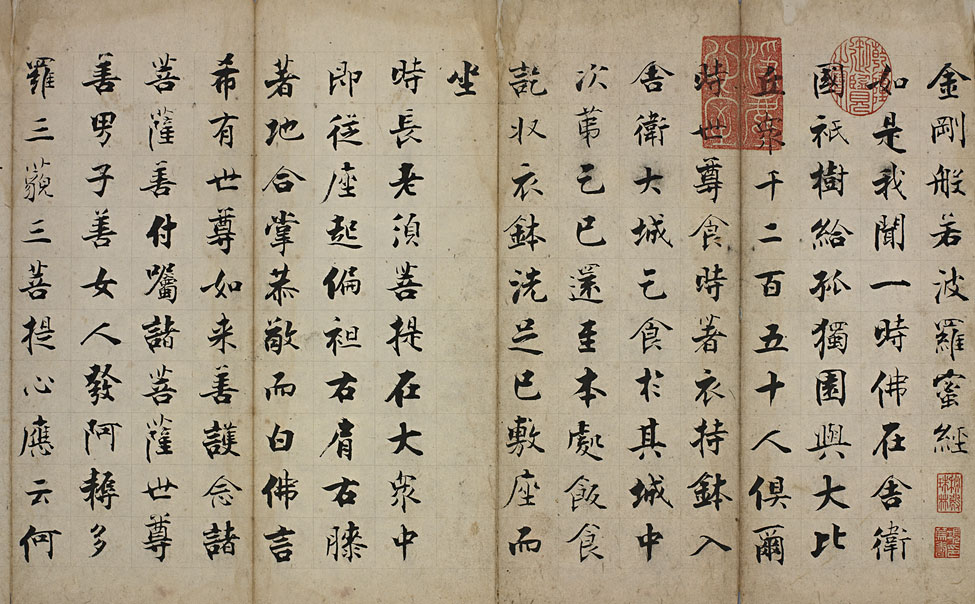
Section of the Diamond Sutra, a handwritten copy by Zhang Jizhi, based on Kumarajiva's translation from Sanskrit to Chinese

=== Translation ===
Kumārajīva revolutionized Chinese Buddhism, and his team's translation style is known for its clarity and for overcoming the previous geyi (concept-matching) system of translation which matched Buddhist terminology with Daoist and Confucian terms. Kumārajīva's readable translation style was distinctive, possessing a flowing smoothness that reflects his prioritization on conveying the meaning as opposed to precise literal rendering. Because of this, his renderings of seminal Mahāyāna texts have often remained more popular than later, more literal translations, e.g. those of Xuanzang.

Kumārajīva's translations were very influential on the development of Buddhist Chinese and they introduced much commonly used terminology, such as:

- 大乘; Dà chéng, or "greater vehicle", for the Sanskrit term Mahāyāna
- 念處; niàn chǔ for Smṛtyupasthāna (placement of mindfulness)
- 菩提; pú tí for Bodhi (awakening)
- 性; xìng for Dhatū (nature, source)

These translations were a group effort and therefore it is more accurate to say that they were translated by a committee which was guided by Kumārajīva, not by Kumārajīva alone. The process of translation began with the reading of the text by Kumārajīva who would also give a running commentary in Chinese. The Chinese monks and students would discuss the text with Kumārajīva and among themselves. A translation in Chinese would emerge from this process, which would be checked by Kumārajīva. The text was then written down and revised numerous times. These were also public events which were attended by devotees, including emperor Yao Xing.

Kumārajīva also developed a system of transcription in order to render Sanskrit terms in Chinese by using certain Chinese characters and their sounds to represent each syllable of a foreign word. This system would go on to become the basis of the development of pinyin romanization. This encounter with Sanskrit influenced the development of the Chinese language itself, not only in the adoption of specifically Buddhist terms, but also regarding certain secular terms as well (such as "moment").

Kumārajīva has sometimes been regarded by both the Chinese and by western scholars as abbreviating his translations, with later translators such as Xuanzang being regarded as being more "precise." According to Jan Nattier, this is actually an erroneous and mistaken view, and the main difference was due to the earlier versions of Kumarajiva's source texts:

[W]here Kumārajīva's work can be compared with an extant Indic manuscript – that is, in those rare cases where part or all of a text he translated has survived in a Sanskrit or Prakrit version — a somewhat surprising result emerges. While his translations are indeed shorter in many instances than their extant (and much later) Sanskrit counterparts, when earlier Indic-language manuscript fragments are available they often provide exact parallels of Kumārajīva's supposed "abbreviations." What seems likely to have happened, in sum, is that Kumārajīva was working from earlier Indian versions in which these expansions had not yet taken place.

=== Translated Texts ===
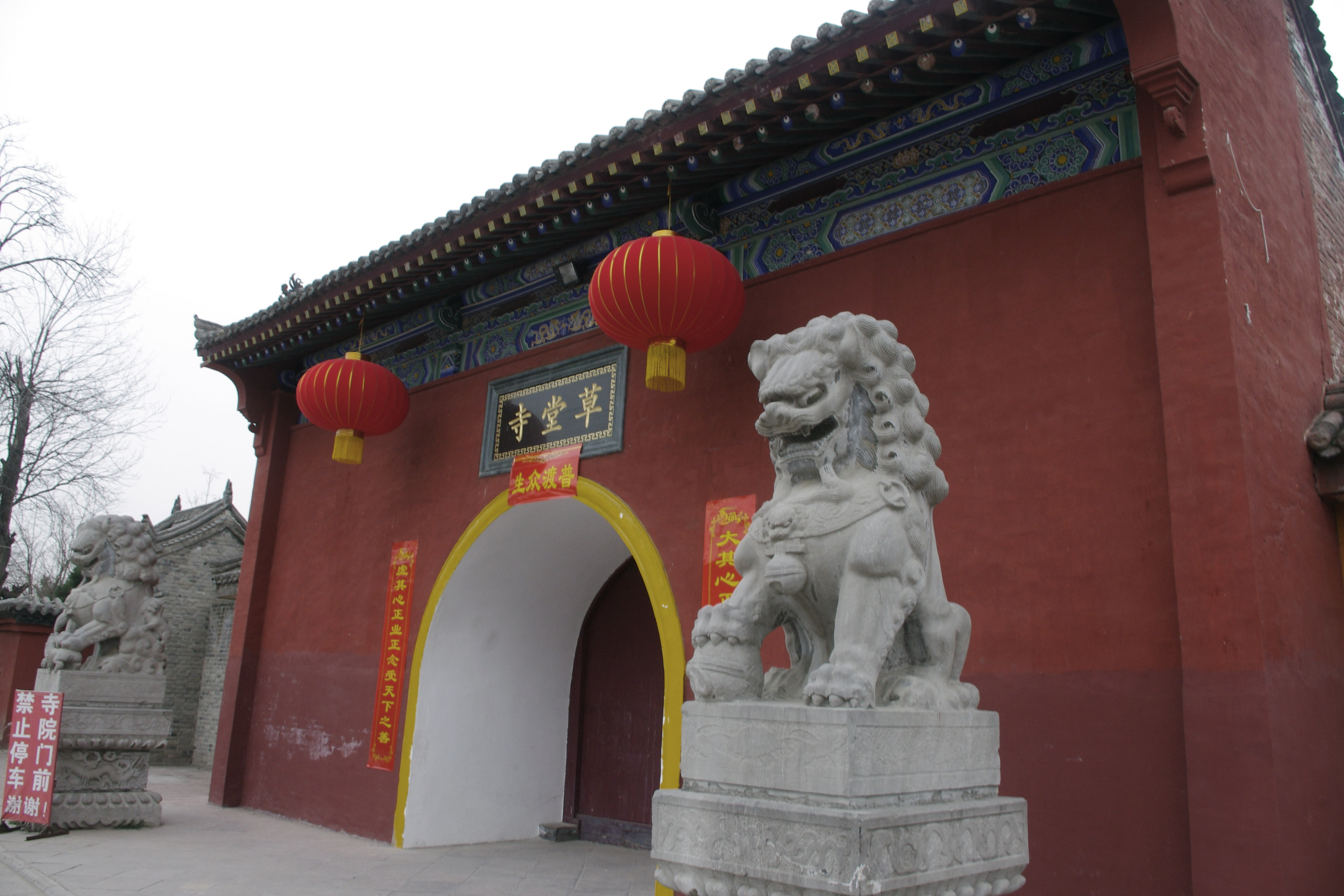
Caotang Temple in present-day Xi'an, Shaanxi was once part of Xiaoyao Garden, where Kumārajīva did his translations.

According to John M. Thompson "at present there are fifty two translations in the Taishō under his name and their authenticity is fairly well accepted." They include Mahāyāna sutras as well as works on Buddhist meditation (dhyāna) and Abhidharma.

==== Sutras ====
Among the most important sutras translated by Kumārajīva and his team (probably from Kuchan target sources) are the following:

- Vajracchedikā Prajñāpāramitā Sūtra (Diamond Sutra)
- Smaller Sukhāvatī-vyūha (T 366)
- Saddharma Puṇḍarīka Sūtra (Lotus Sutra) (T 263–62)
- Vimalakirti Nirdesa Sutra (T 475)
- Aṣṭasāhasrikā Prajñāpāramitā Sūtra, (T 227, 408 CE)
- Pañcaviṃśatisāhasrikā Prajñāpāramitā Sūtra (T 223, 403–404 CE)
- Śūraṅgama Samādhi Sūtra (T 642)
- Daśabhūmikā Sūtra (T 286) in collaboration with Buddhayaśas.
- Acintyaprabhāsa-nirdeśa-sūtra (T 484)
- Viśeṣacintā-brahma-paripṛcchā (T 585–86)
- Bhadrakalpa (T 425)
- Vasudhara-sūtra (T 481–82)
- Pūrṇa-paripṛcchā ( T 310, 17)
- Ratnajāli-paripṛcchā (T 433)
- Vidhi-hṛdaya-vyūha (T 307)
- Sarva-puṇya-samuccaya-samādhi-sūtra (T 381–82)
- Maitreyavyākaraṇa Sūtra

==== Treatises ====
They also translated several key treatises (mainly of the Madhyamaka school), which became the central works of East Asian Madhyamaka Buddhism. These are:

- "The Middle Treatise" (中論; Zhonglun, T. 1564; Madhyamakaśāstra), comprising Nāgārjuna's Mūlamadhyamakakārikā ("Fundamental Verses on the Middle Way") alongside a commentary by *Vimalākṣa / *Piṅgala (青目; Qingmu).
- "The Treatise on the Twelve Gates" (十二門論; Shiermenlun, T. 1568), allegedly Nāgārjuna's *Dvādaśadvāraśāstra, also reconstructed as *Dvādaśamukhaśāstra or as *Dvādaśanikāyaśāstra.
- "The Hundred(-Verse) Treatise" (百論; Bailun, T. 1569; Śatakaśāstra, or Śataśāstra), consisting of a commentary by a certain master Vasu on some verses by Āryadeva.
- "Commentary on the Great Perfection of Wisdom" (大智度論; Dazhidulun, T. 1509; Mahāprajñāpāramitopadeśa). A commentary on the Pañcaviṃśatisāhasrikā Prajñāpāramitā Sūtra attributed to Nāgārjuna, but this attribution is disputed by some modern scholars.
- Satyasiddhi Shastra (Ch'eng-shih lun) – This Abhidharma text, while not being a work of Madhyamaka, was influential on Chinese Madhyamaka, since it also taught the emptiness of dharmas.

Other treatises that the team worked on include the Daśabhūmika-vibhāṣā (T. 1521), a commentary to the Daśabhūmikā Sūtra attributed to Nagarjuna and the "Treatise On Arising Bodhicitta" (T. 1659).

==== Meditation texts ====
Kumārajīva and his team also translated some treatises on meditation (dhyāna). In the Taisho Tripitaka (vol. 15), five meditation works are attributed to Kumārajīva:

- "Scripture of the Secret Essentials of Dhyāna (T. 613. 禪祕要法經; Chan mi yao fa jing)
- "Scripture on the Samādhi of Sitting Dhyāna (T. 614. 坐禪三昧經; Zuòchán sān mēi jīng), ZSJ (also called the 菩薩禪法經; Bodhisattvadhyāna Pusa Chanfa Jing or The Scripture on the Practice of Dhyāna in The Wilderness 阿蘭若習禪法經; E lan Rou Xi Chan Fa Jing).
- "Scripture on the Bodhisattva's Methods of Censuring Sexual Desire" (T. 615. 菩薩訶色欲法經; Pusa he seyu fa jing)
- "Essential Explanation of The Method of Dhyāna (T. 616. 禪法要解; Chán fǎ yào jiě).
- "The Abridged Essence of Dhyāna (T. 617. 思惟略要法; Siwei Lue Yao Fa)

Scholars are divided on how many of these were actually worked on by Kumārajīva (though T. 613 and T. 614 are well attested in early catalogs and prefaces). Furthermore, Chinese sources indicate that these works were edited, summarized and extracted from Indian sources. Eric Greene explains that the main methods of meditation taught in T. 614 are the "five gates of chan" (五門禪) "associated with the so-called yogācāras of northwest India", which "became a standard arrangement in later writings on meditation" and are the following:

- the contemplation of the impure (不淨觀; bu jing guan; aśubha-bhāvanā) for those beset by lust,
- the cultivation of love (慈心; ci xin; the four apramāṇa meditations) for those with aversion,
- the contemplation of dependent origination (因 緣; yin yuan; pratītyasamutpāda) for those with ignorance,
- meditation on the breath (念息; nian xi; ānāpāna-smṛti) for those with "excessive thinking" (多思覺人; vitarka), and
- recollection of the Buddha (念佛; nian fo; buddhānusmṛti) for those with "equally distributed" (等分) defilements.

After having calmed the mind and entered dhyāna (禪; chan) through these methods, the meditator then proceeds to develop wisdom (prajñā) by cultivating the four "foundations of mindfulness" (思念處; si nian chu; smṛtyupasthāna). According to Greene, "following this, one moves through the so-called four nirvedha-bhāgīya-kuśalamūla (四善根; si shan gen), the "roots of good that lead to liberation", which in the Sarvāstivādin system are the highest levels of mundane accomplishment. This in turn leads to the so-called "path of vision" (darśana-maraga), a sequence of sixteen mental moments in which, by means of insight into the four noble truths."

While T. 614 discusses the path of hinayana as well as the bodhisattva path, the actual meditation practices are not different, they are just approached in different ways. For example, the bodhisattva practices the same contemplation of impurity as the sravaka, but they are also warned not to become so disgusted with the world that they seek immediate nirvāṇa. Instead, a bodhisattva should always practice these meditations with the wish for perfecting themselves in order to help others. As such, Kumārajīva seems to have understood the practice of a bodhisattva to have consisted of the same methods of meditation found in śrāvaka-yāna sources, the only difference being that bodhisattvas have a different motivation and a different goal (Buddhahood).

==== Other ====
Other translations include the 大莊嚴經論; Da zhuang yan jing lun (*Mahālaṃkāra-sūtra-śāstra) of Asvaghosa and Samyukta avadana sutra.

According to Robinson,

Kumārajīva's additions to the Vinaya section of the Chinese canon are the Sarvāstivāda-vinaya (T. 1435), the Sarvāstivāda-prātimokṣa-sutra (T. 1436), and, according to tradition, the Pu-sa-chieh-p n (bodhisattva-prātimokṣa), which is probably the second half of the present Brahmajala-sutra (T. 1484).

=== Original works and philosophy ===
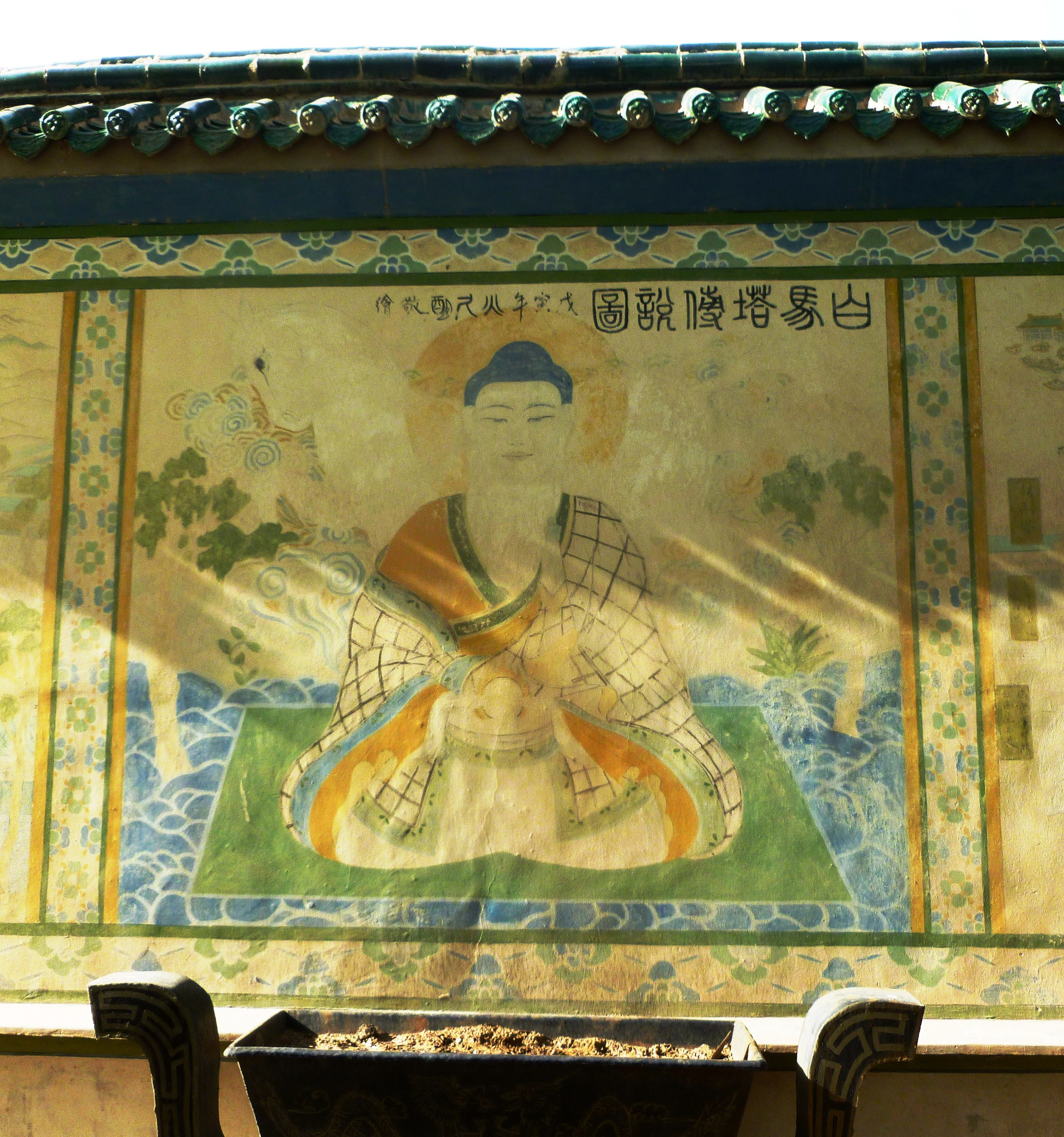
A painting of Kumārajīva at White Horse Pagoda, Dunhuang

Kumārajīva is also known to have authored a few original works, including his Commentary on the Vimalakīrti-nirdesa-sūtra (Zhu Weimojie Jing. Taisho number 1775) and the Shixiang lun (Treatise on Tattva, now lost). Kumārajīva and his team are also responsible for a biography of Nagarjuna (T. 2047), which may have been based on Kumārajīva's own accounts to his students.

Another text which contains some original teachings by Kumārajīva is the Jiumoluoshi fashi dayi (The Great Teaching of Dharma Master Kumārajīva; T. no. 1856), which is a series of letters between Kumārajīva and Lushan Huiyuan (334–416) discussing some basic Mahayana topics.

Regarding Kumārajīva's own philosophical views, according to Richard H. Robinson:

He shows himself to be an orthodox Śūnyavādin and Mādhyamika, rejects the authority of the Abhidharma, and interprets the Āgamas in a Mahāyāna way, holds that the Buddha's statements are purely pragmatic and do not imply any real entities, and denies that real entities arise, because (a) neither inherence nor non-inherence of the effect in the cause is admissible, and (b) simultaneous and successive occurrence of cause and effect are alike untenable. He maintains that reality transcends the four modes of the tetralemma, and he holds Nagarjuna's concept of negation.

Likewise, according to John M. Thompson, the philosophy which emerges from the explanations of Kumārajīva is "virtually identical to the views of Nagarjuna and other Madhyamikas, stressing the emptiness of all dharmas (even the "emptiness of emptiness") and the Bodhisattva's non-attachment to all things and teachings". Thompson adds,

Like both the Prajñāpāramita sutras and Madhyamika commentaries, Kumārajīva says that the Buddha's teachings ultimately come from and lead us to a level beyond words and thought. Because the Buddha and Bodhisattvas reside in this transcendent realm (which is none other than our present world) their wisdom enables them to use various upaya to lead suffering beings to enlightenment. Apparent contradictions and confusions in Buddhist texts are due to their upāya, which accommodate to the audience's level and lead them to the truth. Kumārajīva even suggests that the teachings in the sutras may delude those who are unprepared, i.e. at a lower level of understanding. According to Kumārajīva, we truly understand the Dharma only when we attain complete and pure prajñā. Prajñā is the means of removing all obstacles and hindrances, all attachments–even attachments to itself. As Kumārajīva says, "In the Buddha-Dharma, the medicine of prajñā is just like this. By this medicine, one demolishes the objects of addictions. If within prajñā beings then conceive addiction, then one must practice a method of treatment. If within prajñā there are no addictions to prajñā, then further treatment is not applied."

These ideas are found in the Dazhidulun (T. 1509; Mahāprajñāpāramitopadeśa). Various modern scholars also hold that the Dazhidulun, which was traditionally held to be an original work of Nagarjuna that was translated by Kumārajīva's team, actually contains numerous additions by Kumārajīva and his team or is actually a product of the editorship of Kumārajīva's student Sengrui. As Etienne Lamotte notes, Kumārajīva's team also edited and abridged the latter half of this text considerably.

=== Influence ===
According to Rafal Felbur,

The translations associated with his name – executed both from Prakrits, i.e. vernacular forms of Sanskrit, and from early forms of Buddhist Sanskrit, into a form of classical Chinese – have enjoyed enormous success in the Sinitic tradition. This success is so great that even when, in the subsequent centuries, other scholars produced new and supposedly improved translations of the same texts, it has been the "Kumarajiva versions" that have remained in use in the devotional, exegetical, and literary life of East Asia up to the present day. In the twentieth and twenty-first centuries, as the Sinitic Buddhist traditions have contributed to the emergence of a distinctly global modernist Buddhism, the Kumarajiva corpus of early fifth-century translations has been an implicit major presence.

Aside from the linguistic and terminological influence of Kumārajīva's translation work, his work also influenced the philosophical understanding of Buddhism in China. According to Fan Muyou, before Kumārajīva, many Chinese Buddhists had serious misunderstandings of emptiness and not-self. This is because they had been influenced by Neo-Taoist Xuanxue philosophy and thus they saw emptiness as either a kind of non-being, as a real, or absolute substance (both of which are mistaken interpretations of the concepts of śūnyatā and anatman). Kumārajīva and his students like Sengzhao and Sengrui recognized these errors and worked to correct them by introducing proper interpretations based on Indian Madhyamaka philosophy.

== See also ==
- Chinese Translation Theory
- Silk Road transmission of Buddhism
- Dharmakṣema

== Sources ==
- Chandra, Moti (1977), Trade and Trade Routes in Ancient India, Abhinav Publications, ISBN 9788170170556
- Eitel, E.J.; Edkins, Joseph (1871), "Handbook for the Student of Chinese Buddhism", The Chinese Recorder and Missionary Journal, 3, FOOCHOW.: American Presbyterian Mission Press: 217
- Greene, Eric Matthew (2012), Meditation, Repentance, and Visionary Experience in Early Medieval Chinese Buddhism (PhD dissertation), University of California, Berkeley
- Hansen, Valerie (2015). The Silk Road: A New History. Oxford University Press. ISBN 978-0-19-021842-3.
- Kumar, Yukteshwar (2005), A History of Sino-Indian Relations, APH Publishing Corporation, ISBN 978-8176487986
- Lu, Yang (2004), "Narrative and Historicity in the Buddhist Biographies of Early Medieval China: The Case of Kumārajīva", Asia Major, Third Series, 17 (2): 1–43, archived from the original on 2022-10-07
- Nan, Huai-Chin (1998), Basic Buddhism: Exploring Buddhism and Zen, ISBN 978-1578630202
- Nattier, Jan (1992), "The Heart Sutra: A Chinese Apocryphal Text?", Journal of the International Association of Buddhist Studies, 15 (2): 153–223, archived from the original on 2013-10-29
- Nattier, Jan (2005), A Few Good Men: The Bodhisattva Path according to The Inquiry of Ugra (Ugraparipṛcchā), University of Hawaii Press, ISBN 978-0824830038
- Pollard, Elizabeth (2015), Worlds Together Worlds Apart, New York: W.W. Norton Company Inc, p. 287, ISBN 978-0-393-91847-2
- Puri, B. N. (1987), Buddhism in Central Asia, Motilal Banarsidass Publishers Private Limited, ISBN 978-8120803725
- Robinson, Richard H. (1967), Early Madhyamika in China and India, Madison: University of Wisconsin Press
- Singh, Upinder (2009), A History of Ancient and Early Medieval India: From the Stone Age to the 12th Century, Pearson Education India, ISBN 978-8131716779
- Smith, David Howard (1971), Chinese Religions From 1000 B.C. to the Present Day, Weidenfeld & Nicolson
- Thompson, John M. (2008), Understanding Prajñā: Sengzhao's "Wild Words" and the Search for Wisdom, Peter Lang, ISBN 9780820488264
- Wu, Ching-hsing (1938), "Some Notes on Kao Seng Chuan", T'ien Hsia Monthly, 7, Kelly and Walsh, ltd.
- Zürcher, Erik (2007) The Buddhist Conquest of China: The Spread and Adaptation of Buddhism in Early Medieval China. BRILL.
- This article incorporates text from The Chinese recorder and missionary journal, Volume 3, a publication from 1871, now in the public domain in the United States.
