= Śataśāstra =

Mahayana Buddhist text

The Śataśāstra is the reconstructed Sanskrit title of a Buddhist treatise in the Mādhyamaka tradition known only in its Chinese translation under the title Bai lun (Chinese: 百論; Japanese: Hyaku ron; Korean: Paek non). Both names translate to the Hundred Verse Treatise, although the word "verse" is implied and not actually present in either Sanskrit or Chinese. It is attributed to Āryadeva, a student of Nāgārjuna. The text was translated into Chinese by Kumārajīva in 404 CE and came to be counted as one of the three foundational texts of the Three Treatise School. In the Chinese tradition, another text by Āryadeva called the Catuḥśataka—which was not translated into Chinese for another two and a half centuries, but is extant today in Sanskrit and Tibetan—was understood to be an expanded version of the Bai lun. Today, however, scholars interpret the Bai lun to be a summary of the Catuḥśataka. Nonetheless, the sequence in which the topics are discussed differs, as do the specifics, and also the Bai lun has some content not seen in the Catuḥśataka at all. This has led to an alternative hypothesis that it may simply represent Kumārajīva's understanding of the Catuḥśataka.
