= Sengrui =

Sengrui (Sēng ruì 僧睿; 371–438 CE) was a Buddhist monk and scholar. He was born in what is now Henan. He became a monk at age 18, traveling extensively from age 24, meeting among others Dao An.

He ended up in Chang'an, where he took part in Kumarajiva's translation project. Sengrui wrote the introduction to Kumarajiva's translation of the Lotus Sutra. In fact, he is generally seen as one of four Kumarajiva's principal disciples.
