= Nagarjuna =

Indian Mahayana Buddhist philosopher from the early 1st millenium CE

Nāgārjuna
- नागार्जुन
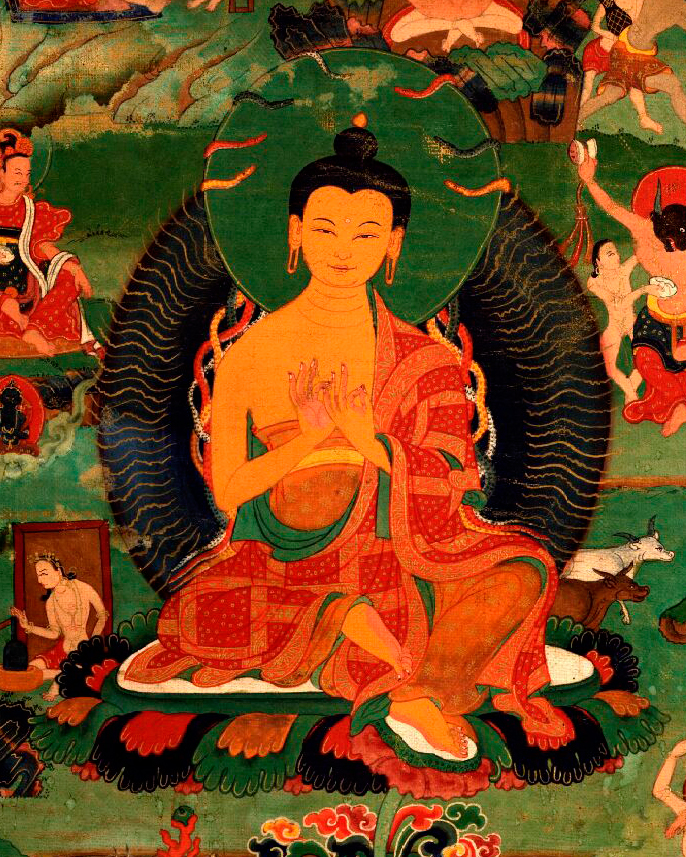
- Painting of Nāgārjuna (18th century)
- Born: c. 150 CE; South India
- Died: c. 250 CE; India
- Occupations: Buddhist teacher, monk and philosopher

Philosophical work
- Era: Ancient philosophy
- Region: Eastern philosophy: Indian philosophy
- School: Mahāyāna Buddhism; Madhyamaka; Pure Land Buddhism; Tiantai Buddhism
- Notable works: Mūlamadhyamakakārikā
- Notable ideas: Madhyamaka; Śūnyatā; Two truths doctrine

Nāgārjuna (Sanskrit, from Nāga + Arjuna; Chn. Lóngshù 龍樹; Tib. Klu sgrub; c. 150 – c. 250 CE) was a philosopher and Mahāyāna Buddhist monk from South India, considered the founder of the Madhyamaka (Centrism, Middle Way) school.

Nāgārjuna is widely considered to be the most important Buddhist philosopher after the Buddha himself. Indeed, in Tibetan Buddhism, he is even called the "second Buddha". He was a well known defender of the Mahāyāna movement and his treatises (śāstras) are the foundational texts of a school of Buddhist philosophy known as the view of emptiness (Śūnyatāvāda) or Madhyamaka. Nāgārjuna remains a key figure in all contemporary traditions of Mahāyāna Buddhism, and his philosophical writings on the doctrine of “emptiness” (śūnyatā) influenced Indian philosophy for a millennium, as well as being an indispensable doctrinal source for Mahāyāna doctrine in East Asian Buddhism and Indo-Tibetan Buddhism.

Nāgārjuna's Mūlamadhyamakakārikā (Root Verses on Madhyamaka, MMK) is the most important text on the Madhyamaka philosophy of emptiness. The MMK inspired a large number of commentaries in Sanskrit, Chinese, Tibetan, Korean and Japanese and continues to be studied today.

== History ==
A map of the Satavahana Kingdom, showing the location of Amaravathi (where Nāgārjuna may have lived and worked according to Walser) and Vidarbha (the birthplace of Nāgārjuna according to Kumārajīva)

=== Background ===
India in the first and second centuries CE was politically divided into various states, including the Kushan Empire and the Satavahana Kingdom. At this point in Buddhist history, the Buddhist community was already divided into various Buddhist schools and had spread throughout India.

At this time, there was already a small and nascent Mahāyāna movement. Mahāyāna ideas were held by a minority of Buddhists in India at the time. As Joseph Walser writes, "Mahāyāna before the fifth century was largely invisible and probably existed only as a minority and largely unrecognized movement within the fold of nikāya Buddhism." By the second century, early Mahāyāna Sūtras such as the Aṣṭasāhasrikā Prajñāpāramitā were already circulating among certain Mahāyāna circles.

=== Life ===
Very little is reliably known of the life of Nāgārjuna and modern historians do not agree on a specific date or place (multiple places in India suggested) for him. Nevertheless, most scholars place him somewhere in South India at some time between 1st to 3rd century CE. The surviving accounts were written in Chinese and Tibetan centuries after his death and are mostly hagiographical accounts that are historically unverifiable. The earliest accounts date to Kumārajīva's time (350−409 or 344−413) and are quite sparse in detail, while Tibetan accounts date from much later (11th century onwards).

Some scholars such as Joseph Walser argue that Nāgārjuna was an advisor to a king of the Sātavāhana dynasty which ruled the Deccan Plateau in the second century. This is supported by most of the traditional hagiographical sources as well. Archaeological evidence at Amarāvatī indicates that if this is true, the king may have been Yajña Śrī Śātakarṇi (c. second half of the 2nd century). On the basis of this association, Nāgārjuna is conventionally placed at around 150–250 CE.

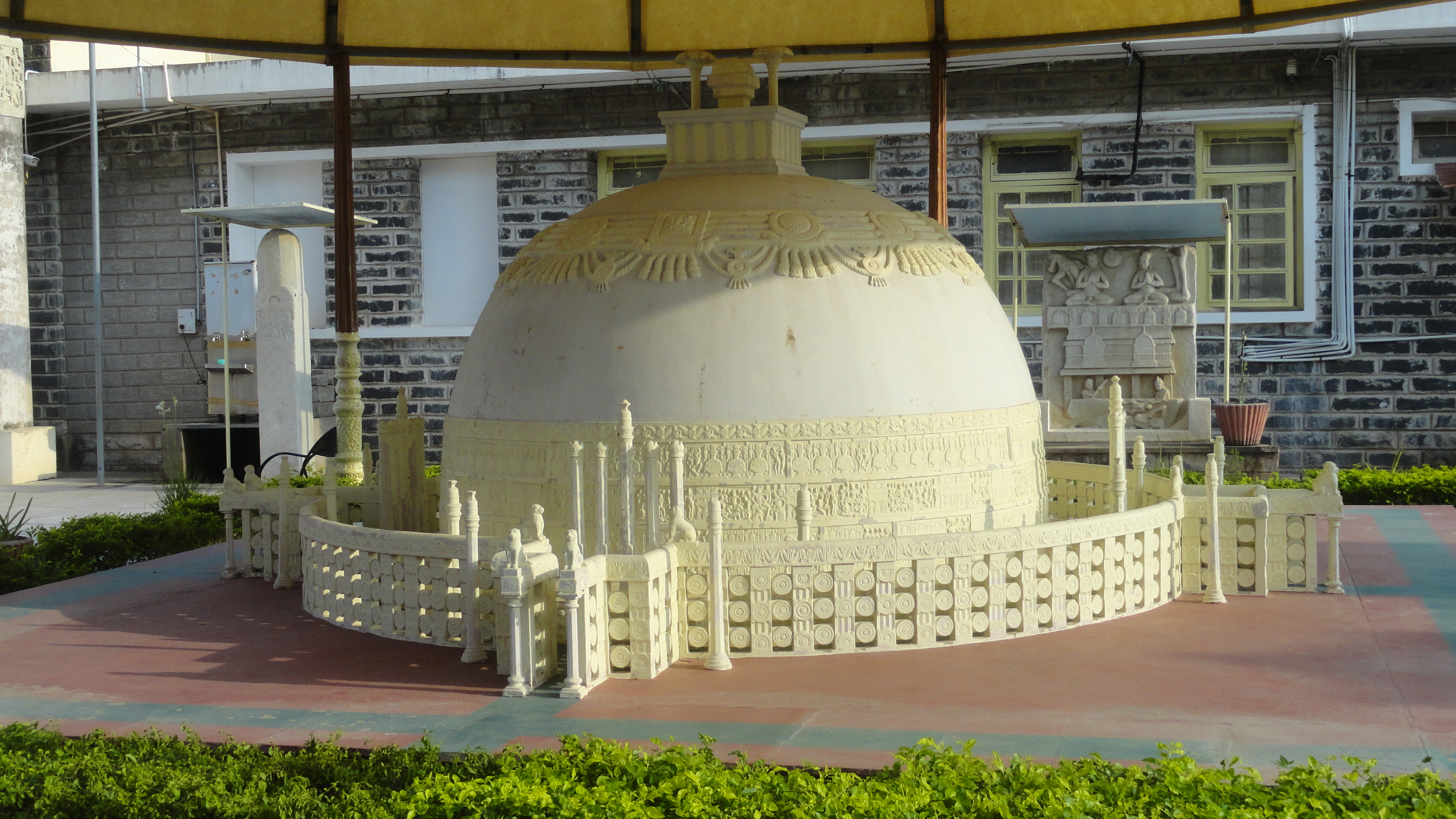
A model of the Amaravati Stupa

Walser also thinks that it is most likely that when Nāgārjuna wrote the Ratnavali, he lived in a mixed monastery (with Mahāyānists and non-Mahāyānists) in which Mahāyānists were the minority. The most likely sectarian affiliation of the monastery according to Walser was Purvasailya, Aparasailya, or Caityaka (which were Mahāsāṃghika sub-schools). He also argues that "it is plausible that he wrote the Ratnavali within a thirty-year period at the end of the second century in the Andhra region around Dhanyakataka (modern-day Amaravati)."

=== Traditional accounts ===
The earliest biographical sources on Nāgārjuna are associated with the Kuchan translator monk Kumārajīva (344–413) and his circle of scholars. They include the Zhu weimo-jie jing (注維摩詰經; T. 1775, a commentary on the Vimalakirti), the Maming pusa zhuan (馬鳴菩薩傳, Tradition of Aśvaghoṣa Bodhisattva, a combined biography of Nāgārjuna and Aśvaghoṣa) and also various prefaces to the Chinese translations to Nāgārjuna's works, such the preface to the Zhong lun (中論; *Madhyamaka-śāstra, T. 1564) and the preface to the Da zhidu lun (大智度論; T.1509).

These writings paint a minimal picture of Nāgārjuna, who is depicted as the greatest bodhisattva since Śākyamuni himself. He is depicted as living during a time when the Dharma was "decadent and weak" and as saving the Mahāyāna by championing its teachings through debate and textual composition. According to Huiyuan's preface to the Da zhidu lun, Nāgārjuna was a virtuous gentleman who, saddened at the delusion of the masses, took the vows of a monk and "dwelt in seclusion in the woods and swamps, lived as a hermit and practiced dhyāna. He stilled his mind and studied the subtle, his thoughts penetrating the supranormal." According to Huiyuan, Nāgārjuna had an awakening, and then travelled to the Himālayas, where he received the Mahāyāna teachings from a śramaṇa. He then travelled to the palace of the nāgas, where "there was no important canon or secret text that he did not master." Then, according to Huiyuan,

When the roots of his impediments had been pulled up, his name crowned the stages of the [bodhisattva] path … Consequently, the non-Buddhists esteemed his manner and famous gentlemen submitted to his dictates. From that time, the enterprise of the Greater Vehicle flourished again.

This basic account of Nāgārjuna as a great Mahāyāna revivalist is echoed by the writings of Sengzhao, and Sengrui, both students of Kumārajīva. For example, Sengrui writes that at the end of the age of Semblance Dharma false teachings flourished, and then Nāgārjuna's writings "opened the great road in such a manner that the carriage of the Greater Vehicle could advance straight ahead". Sengzhao also tells a story of Nāgārjuna defeating a non-buddhist in debate.

Later hagiographies were composed in China and in Tibet. Chinese hagiographies include the Longshu pusa zhuan (T. 2047), which, while traditionally attributed to Kumārajīva, is likely a later composition, and the Fu fazang yinyuan zhuan (T. 2058). These texts state that Nāgārjuna was a Brahmin who had mastered all the Vedas and traditional Brahmin arts and then converted to Buddhism, later travelling to the palace of the dragons (nagas) under the ocean. They also contain various miraculous stories, depicting Nāgārjuna as a spellcasting wonderworker who is a master of mantras as well as alchemy, able to defeat haughty Brahmins in battles of intellect and magic duels. The traditional religious hagiographies place Nāgārjuna in various Indian regions. Chinese sources, as well as Candrakirti, place him in Vidarbha, South India, while Xuanzang mentions he was from south Kosala.

Traditional religious hagiographies also associate Nāgārjuna with the teaching of the Prajñāpāramitā sūtras, as well as with having revealed these scriptures to the world after they had remained hidden for some time. The sources differ on where this happened and how Nāgārjuna retrieved the sutras. Some sources say he retrieved the sutras from the land of the nāgas, which is located either in the Himalayas or at the bottom of the ocean.

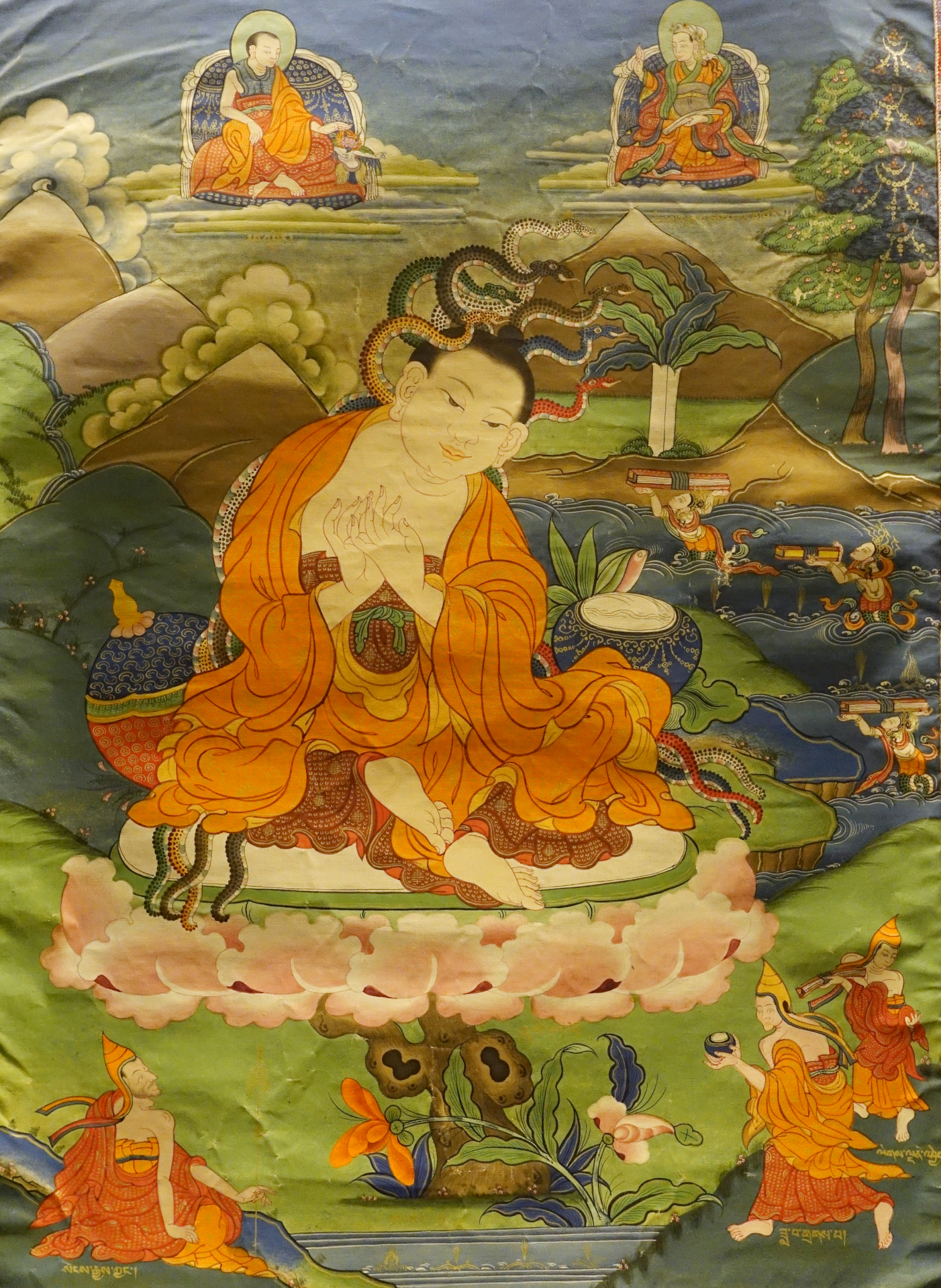
A Tibetan depiction of Nagarjuna; the snakes are depicted as protectors around Nagarjuna's head and the nagas rising out of the water are offering Buddhist sutras.

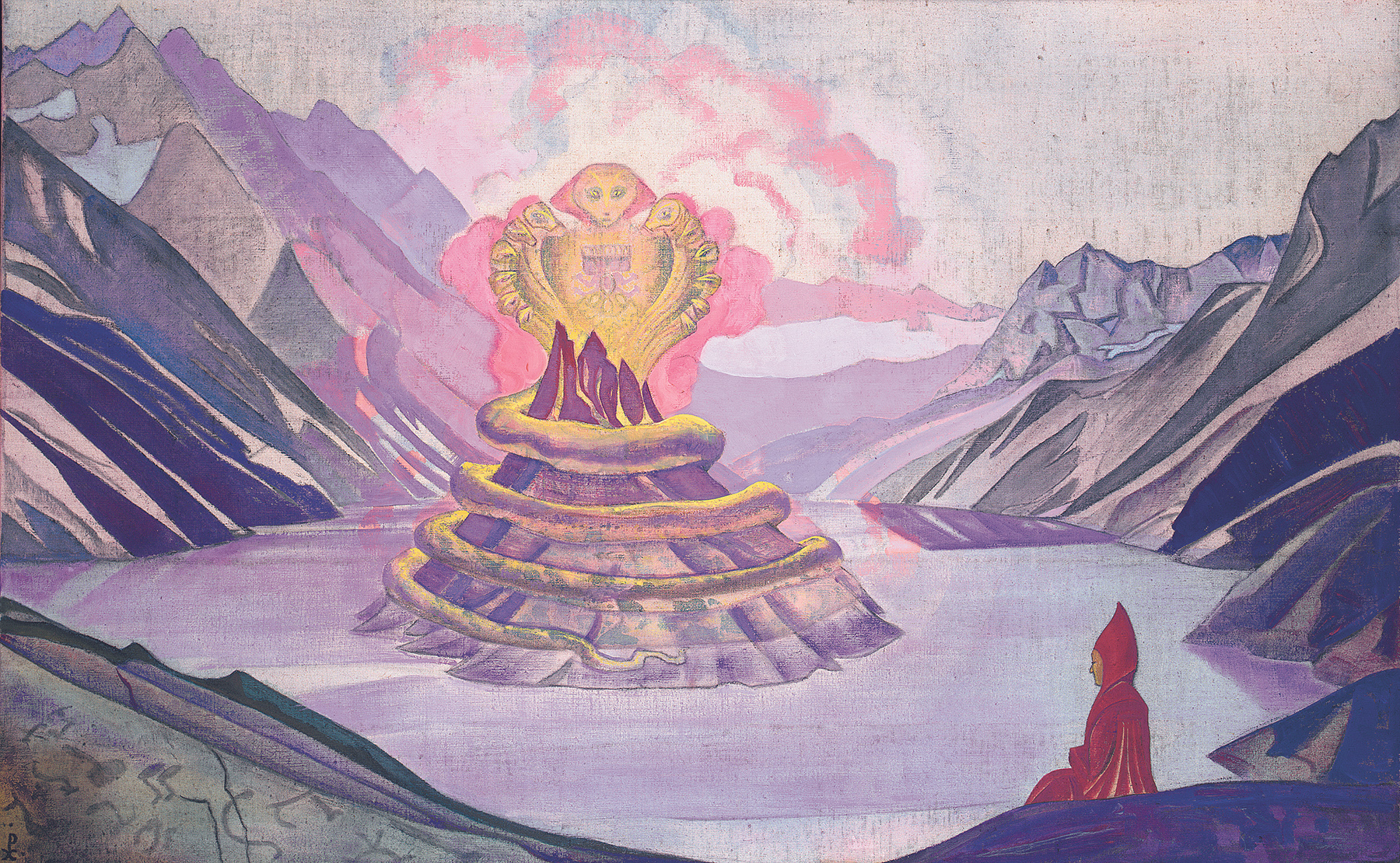
Nicholas Roerich "Nagarjuna Conqueror of the Serpent" (1925)

Nāgārjuna himself is often depicted in composite form comprising human and nāga characteristics. Nāgas are snake-like supernatural beings of great magical power that feature in Hindu, Buddhist and Jain mythology. Nāgas are found throughout Indian religious culture, and typically signify intelligent serpents or dragons that are responsible for rain, lakes, and other bodies of water. In Buddhism, a naga can be a symbol of a realised arhat or wise person.

Tibetan and Chinese Esoteric sources also associate Nāgārjuna with the use of mantras, and with the Vajrayana tradition in general. For example, Yijing (635–713) writes that Nāgārjuna had passed down the teachings of the Vidyādharapiṭaka ("Canon of the Spell-Wielders"), which was a legendary source of Buddhist dhāraṇī and mantra incantations, to his disciple Nanda, placing him at the beginning of the East Asian Buddhist esoteric tradition, which soon began to see him as their founding patriarch. In a similar fashion, the Pure Land tradition also considers Nāgārjuna to be its first patriarch, basing itself on the Chinese translation of the Dasabhumikavibhāsā (Commentary on the Ten Stages Sutra) which discusses how to be born in the Sukhāvatī pure land of Amitābha Buddha. To authenticate their view of Nāgārjuna as patriarch, Pure Land authors drew on this and other classic sources, like a prophecy found in the Laṅkāvatāra-sūtra of Nāgārjuna's rebirth in Sukhāvatī, and the Pure Land Rebirth Dhāraṇī (T. 368) which is said to have been received by Nāgārjuna in a dream, according to a colophon to the dhāraṇī.

Traditional sources also claim that Nāgārjuna practised ayurvedic alchemy (rasāyana), creating elixirs of long life, among other substances. The Longshu pusa zhuan, for example, depicts Nāgārjuna making an elixir of invisibility, and Buton Rinchen Drub, Taranatha and Xuanzang all state that he could turn rocks into gold.

Tibetan hagiographies also state that Nāgārjuna studied at Nālanda Mahavihara. However, according to Walser, this university was not a strong monastic center until about 425. Also, as Walser notes, "Xuanzang and Yijing both spent considerable time at Nālanda and studied Nāgārjuna’s texts there. It is strange that they would have spent so much time there and yet chose not to report any local tales of a man whose works played such an important part in the curriculum."

Some sources (Buton Rinchen Drub and the other Tibetan historians) claim that in his later years, Nāgārjuna lived on the mountain of Śrīparvata near the city that would later be called Nāgārjunakoṇḍa ("Hill of Nāgārjuna"). The ruins of Nāgārjunakoṇḍa are located in Guntur district, Andhra Pradesh. The Caitika and Bahuśrutīya nikāyas are known to have had monasteries in Nāgārjunakoṇḍa. The archaeological finds at Nāgārjunakoṇḍa have not resulted in any evidence that the site was associated with Nagarjuna. The name "Nāgārjunakoṇḍa" dates from the medieval period, and the 3rd–4th century inscriptions found at the site make it clear that it was known as "Vijayapuri" in the ancient period.

=== Other Nāgārjunas ===
There are a multitude of texts attributed to "Nāgārjuna", many of these texts date from much later periods. This has caused much confusion for the traditional Buddhist biographers and doxographers. Modern scholars are divided on how to classify these later texts and how many later writers called "Nāgārjuna" existed (the name remains popular today in Andhra Pradesh).

Some scholars have posited that there was a separate Aryuvedic writer called Nāgārjuna who wrote numerous treatises on Rasayana. Also, there is a later Tantric Buddhist author by the same name who may have been a scholar at Nālandā University and wrote on Buddhist tantra. According to Donald S. Lopez Jr., he originally belonged to a Brahmin family from eastern India and later became Buddhist.

There is also a Jain figure of the same name who was said to have travelled to the Himalayas. Walser thinks that it is possible that stories related to this figure influenced Buddhist legends as well.

== Works ==
There exist a number of influential texts attributed to Nāgārjuna; however, as there are many pseudepigrapha attributed to him, lively controversy exists over which are his authentic works. The Chinese Canon includes over 22 texts attributed to Nāgārjuna, while the Tibetan Tanjur contains over 140 works attributed to Nāgārjuna.

=== Mūlamadhyamakakārikā ===
The Mūlamadhyamakakārikā (MMK, Root Verses on the Middle Way) is Nāgārjuna's best-known work. It is a rich philosophical text made up of concise aphoristic Sanskrit kārikā verses which explains the theory of emptiness through numerous topics and arguments. The bulk of the verses focus on defeating and deconstructing arguments for substance theories. The work also relies on earlier sources like the Kātyāyana Sutra and the Perfection of Wisdom sutras to expound on the theory of dependent arising and the universal emptiness of all things.

The earliest translation of and commentary on the MMK is found in the Chinese translation of Kumārajīva, called the Madhyamakaśāstra (Zhong lun 中論; T. 1564), which merges the root text with a commentary attributed to a certain Qingmu (青目, *Piṅgala).

=== Major attributed works ===
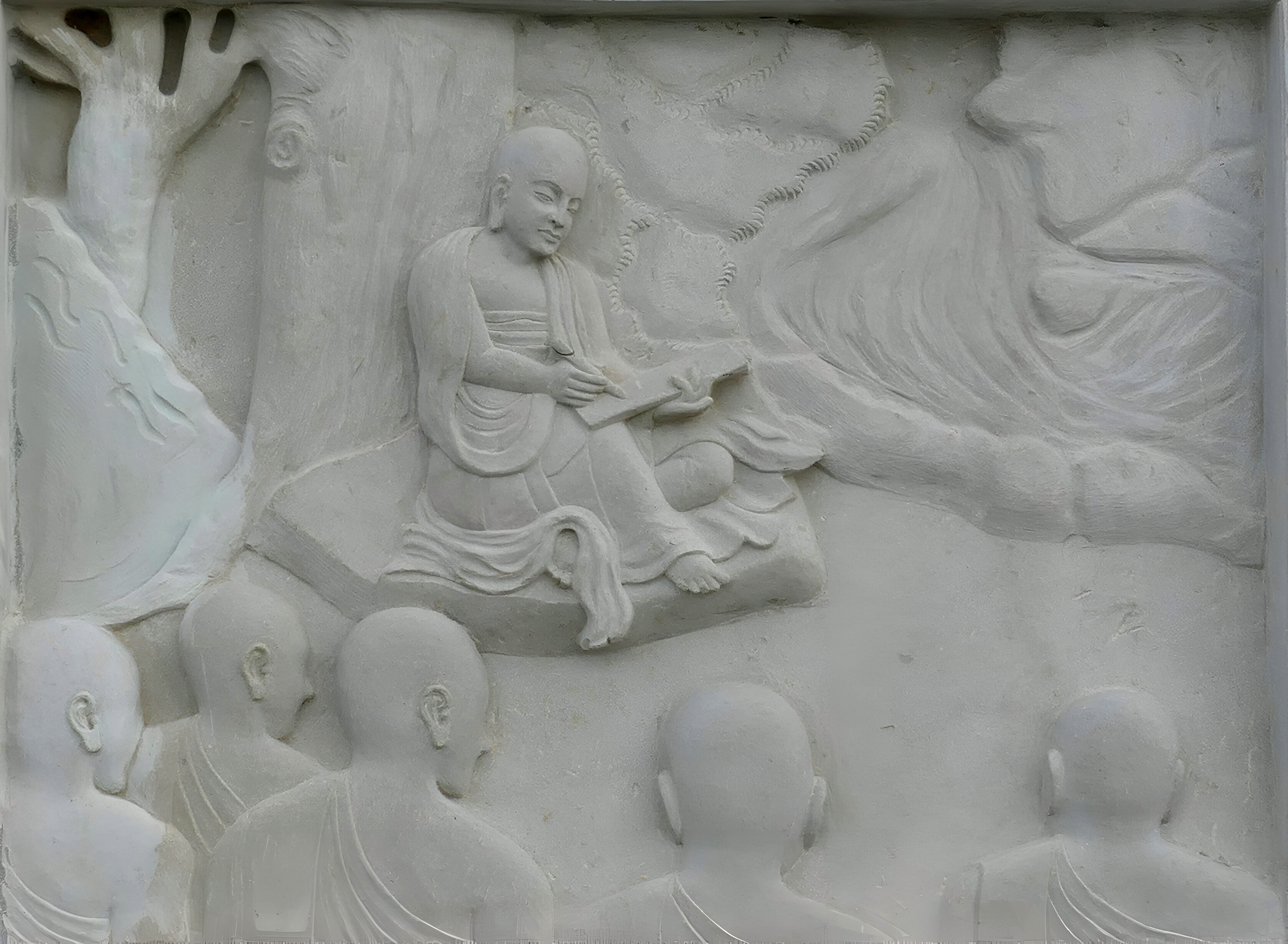
Nagarjuna composing texts in front of his disciples, relief at Buddhavanam Stupa, Telangana.

According to David Seyfort Ruegg, the Madhyamakasastrastuti attributed to Candrakirti (c. 600 – c. 650) refers to eight texts by Nagarjuna:

the (Madhyamaka)karikas, the Yuktisastika, the Sunyatasaptati, the Vigrahavyavartani, the Vidala (i.e. Vaidalyasutra/Vaidalyaprakarana), the Ratnavali, the Sutrasamuccaya, and Samstutis (Hymns). This list covers not only much less than the grand total of works ascribed to Nagarjuna in the Chinese and Tibetan collections, but it does not even include all such works that Candrakirti has himself cited in his writings.

According to one view, that of Christian Lindtner, the works definitely written by Nāgārjuna are:

- Mūlamadhyamaka-kārikā (Fundamental Verses of the Middle Way, MMK), available in three Sanskrit manuscripts and numerous translations.
- Śūnyatāsaptati (Seventy Verses on Emptiness), accompanied by a prose commentary ascribed to Nagarjuna himself.
- Vigrahavyāvartanī (The End of Disputes).
- Vaidalyaprakaraṇa (Pulverizing the Categories), a prose work critiquing the categories used by Indian Nyaya philosophy.
- Vyavahārasiddhi (Proof of Convention).
- Yuktiṣāṣṭika (Sixty Verses on Reasoning).
- Catuḥstava (Four Hymns): Lokātīta-stava (Hymn to transcendence), Niraupamya-stava (to the Peerless), Acintya-stava (to the Inconceivable), and Paramārtha-stava (to Ultimate Truth).
- Ratnāvalī (Precious Garland), subtitled (rajaparikatha), a discourse addressed to an Indian king (possibly a Satavahana monarch).
- Pratītyasamutpādahṝdayakārika (Verses on the heart of Dependent Arising), along with a short commentary (Vyākhyāna).
- Sūtrasamuccaya, an anthology of various sutra passages.
- Bodhicittavivaraṇa (Exposition of the awakening mind).
- Suhṛllekha (Letter to a Good Friend).
- Bodhisaṃbhāraśāstra (Requisites of awakening), a work the path of the Bodhisattva and paramitas, it is quoted by Candrakirti in his commentary on Aryadeva's four hundred. Now only extant in Chinese translation (Taisho 1660).

Other scholars have challenged and argued against some of the above works being Nagarjuna's. David F. Burton notes that Christian Lindtner is "rather liberal" with his list of works and that other scholars have called some of these into question. He notes how Paul Williams argued convincingly that the Bodhicittavivaraṇa must be a later text. In his study, Burton relies on the texts that he considers "least controversial": Mūlamadhyamaka-kārikā, Vigrahavyāvartanī, Śūnyatāsaptati, Yuktiṣāṣṭika, Catuḥstava, Vaidalyaprakaraṇa and Ratnāvalī.

Similarly, Jan Westerhoff notes how there is uncertainty about the attribution of Nagarjuna's works (and about his life in general). He relies on six works: MMK, Vigrahavyāvartanī, Śūnyatāsaptati, Yuktiṣāṣṭika, Vaidalyaprakaraṇa and Ratnāvalī, all of which "expound a single, coherent philosophical system", and are attributed to Nagarjuna by a variety of Indian and Tibetan sources.

The Tibetan historian Buston considers the first six to be the main treatises of Nāgārjuna (this is called the "yukti corpus", rigs chogs), while according to Tāranātha only the first five are the works of Nāgārjuna. TRV Murti considers Ratnāvalī, Pratītyasamutpādahṝdaya and Sūtrasamuccaya to be works of Nāgārjuna as the first two are quoted profusely by Chandrakirti and the third by Shantideva.

=== Other attributed works ===
In addition to works mentioned above, numerous other works are attributed to Nāgārjuna, many of which are dubious attributions and later works. There is an ongoing, lively controversy over which of those works are authentic. Christian Lindtner divides the various attributed works as "1) correctly attributed, 2) wrongly attributed to him, and 3) those which may or may not be genuine."

Lindtner further divides the third category of dubious or questionable texts into those which are "perhaps authentic" and those who are unlikely to be authentic.

Those which he sees as perhaps being authentic include:

- Mahāyānavimsika, it is cited as Nagarjuna's work in the Tattvasamgraha as well as by Atisha, Lindtner sees the style and content as compatible with the yukti corpus. Survives in Sanskrit.
- Bodhicittotpādavidhi, a short text that describes the sevenfold write for a bodhisattva,
- Dvadasakāranayastotra, a madhyamaka text only extant in Tibetan,
- (Madhyamaka-)Bhavasamkrānti, a verse from this is attributed to Nagarjuna by Bhavaviveka.
- Nirālamba-stava,
- Sālistambakārikā, only exists in Tibetan, it is a versification of the Śālistamba Sūtra
- Stutytitastava, only exists in Tibetan
- Danaparikatha, only exists in Tibetan, a praise of giving (dana)
- Cittavajrastava,
- Mulasarvāstivadisrāmanerakārikā, 50 karikas on the Vinaya of the Mulasarvastivadins
- Dasabhumikavibhāsā, only exists in Chinese, a commentary on the Dashabhumikasutra
- Lokapariksā,
- Yogasataka, a medical text
- Prajñadanda
- Rasavaisesikasutra, a rasayana (biochemical) text
- Bhāvanākrama, contains various verses similar to the Lankavatara, it is cited in the Tattvasamgraha as by Nagarjuna
- Rasaratnākara deals with the formation of mercury compounds.

Ruegg notes various works of uncertain authorship which have been attributed to Nagarjuna, including the Dharmadhatustava (Hymn to the Dharmadhatu, which shows later influences), Mahayanavimsika, Salistambakarikas, the Bhavasamkranti, and the Dasabhumtkavibhāsā. Furthermore, Ruegg writes that "three collections of stanzas on the virtues of intelligence and moral conduct ascribed to Nagarjuna are extant in Tibetan translation": Prajñasatakaprakarana, Nitisastra-Jantuposanabindu and Niti-sastra-Prajñadanda.

=== Attributions which are likely to be false ===
Meanwhile, those texts that Lindtner considers as questionable and likely inauthentic are:

Aksarasataka, Akutobhaya (Mulamadhyamakavrtti), Aryabhattaraka-Manjusriparamarthastuti, Kayatrayastotra, Narakoddharastava, Niruttarastava, Vandanastava, Dharmasamgraha, Dharmadhatugarbhavivarana, Ekaslokasastra, Isvarakartrtvanirakrtih (A refutation of God/Isvara), Sattvaradhanastava, Upayahrdaya, Astadasasunyatasastra, Dharmadhatustava, Yogaratnamala.

Meanwhile, Lindtner's list of outright wrong attributions is:

Mahāprajñāpāramitopadeśa (Dà zhìdù lùn), Abudhabodhakaprakarana, Guhyasamajatantratika, Dvadasadvaraka, Prajñaparamitastotra, and Svabhavatrayapravesasiddhi.

Notably, the Dà zhìdù lùn (Taisho 1509, "Commentary on the great prajñaparamita") which has been influential in Chinese Buddhism, has been questioned as a genuine work of Nāgārjuna by various scholars including Lamotte. This work is also only attested in a Chinese translation by Kumārajīva and is unknown in the Tibetan and Indian traditions.

Other works are extant only in Chinese, one of these is the Shih-erh-men-lun or 'Twelve-topic treatise' (*Dvadasanikaya or *Dvadasamukha-sastra); one of the three basic treatises of the Sanlun school (East Asian Madhyamaka).

Several works considered important in esoteric Buddhism are attributed to Nāgārjuna and his disciples by traditional historians like Tāranātha from 17th century Tibet. These historians try to account for chronological difficulties with various theories, such as seeing later writings as mystical revelations. For a useful summary of this tradition, see Wedemeyer 2007. Lindtner sees the author of some of these tantric works as being a tantric Nagarjuna who lives much later, sometimes called "Nagarjuna II".

== Teaching and philosophy ==
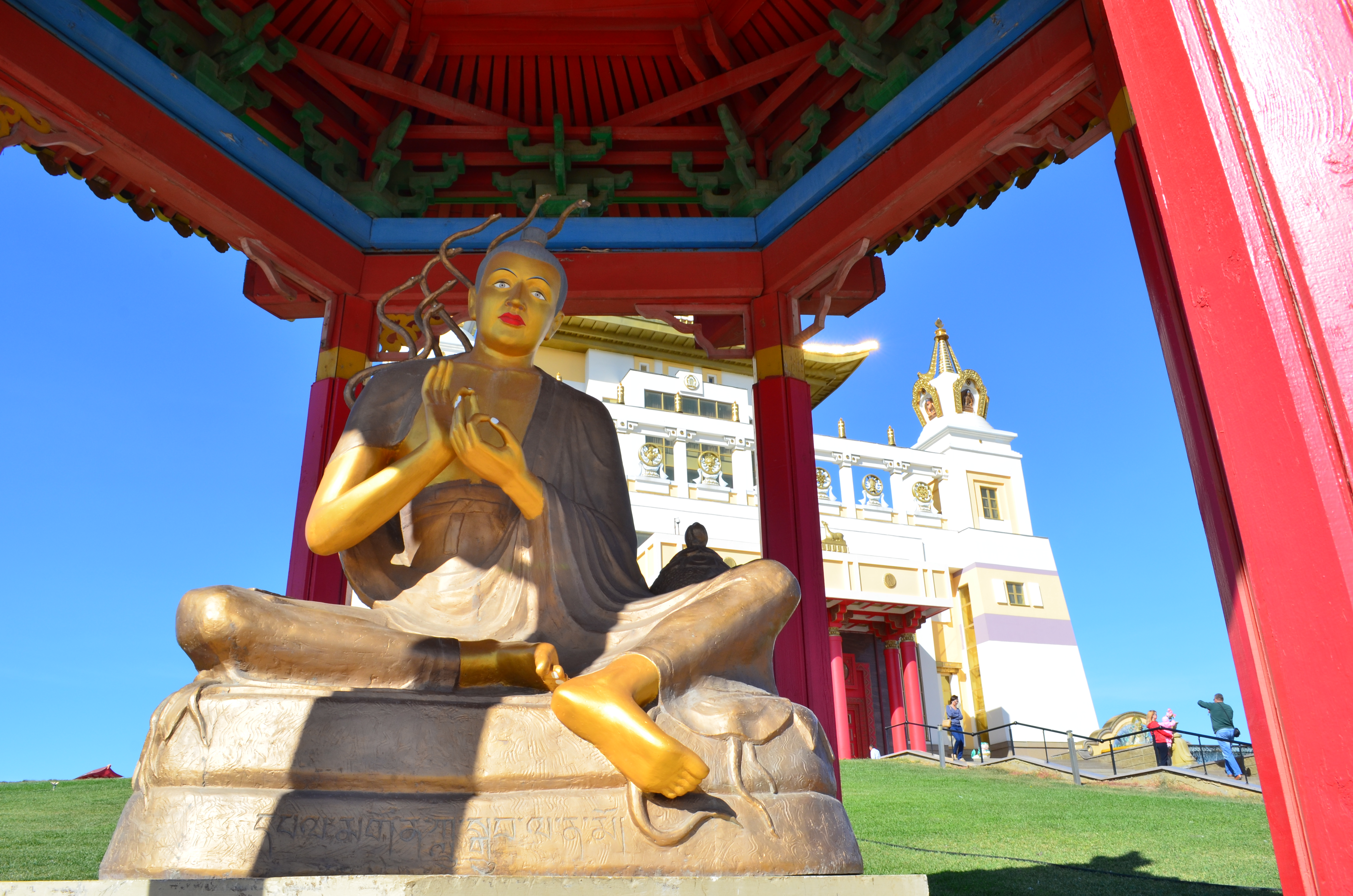
Statue of Nāgārjuna in front of a Buddhist temple in Elista, Kalmykia, Russia

Nāgārjuna's teachings bring together key Buddhist doctrines, particularly emptiness, not-self and pratītyasamutpāda ("dependent origination"), to refute the metaphysics of some of his contemporaries and present a coherent Mahayana Buddhist worldview. The core of his thought is based on refuting all metaphysical theories of svabhāva (substances), which leads to the middle way (madhyamā pratipad), which avoids metaphysically extreme views of existence (astitva/bhāva) and views of nonexistence (nāstitva/abhāva), also known as the views of eternalism (śāśvata) and annihilationism (uccheda). Because of this, Nāgārjuna's philosophical teaching is called the "middling" or "centrist" view (Madhyamaka), though this term was first introduced by Bhavaviveka in the sixth century.

Apart from the more famous rational works which focus on emptiness (called the "yukti" corpus), Nāgārjuna also wrote various texts which discuss other aspects of the Buddhist religion, including texts that discuss the bodhisattva path such as the Ratnāvalī (Precious Garland), Suhṛllekha (Letter to a Good Friend), and the Bodhisaṃbhāraśāstra (Requisites of Awakening). These sources contain most of his discussions on ethics and religious practice and are forerunners to later Mahayana treatises on the bodhisattva path. Furthermore, there is a set of four religious hymns (the Catuḥstava) widely attributed to Nāgārjuna. These describe the ultimate truth in more poetic and positive ways than the rationalistic writings.

Some scholars such as Fyodor Shcherbatskoy and T.R.V. Murti held that Nāgārjuna was the inventor of the emptiness doctrine; however, more recent work by scholars such as Choong Mun-keat, Yin Shun and Dhammajothi Thero argue that Nāgārjuna was the main defender of a doctrine already found in earlier sources, including early Buddhist works as well as Mahayana sutras.

=== Emptiness ===
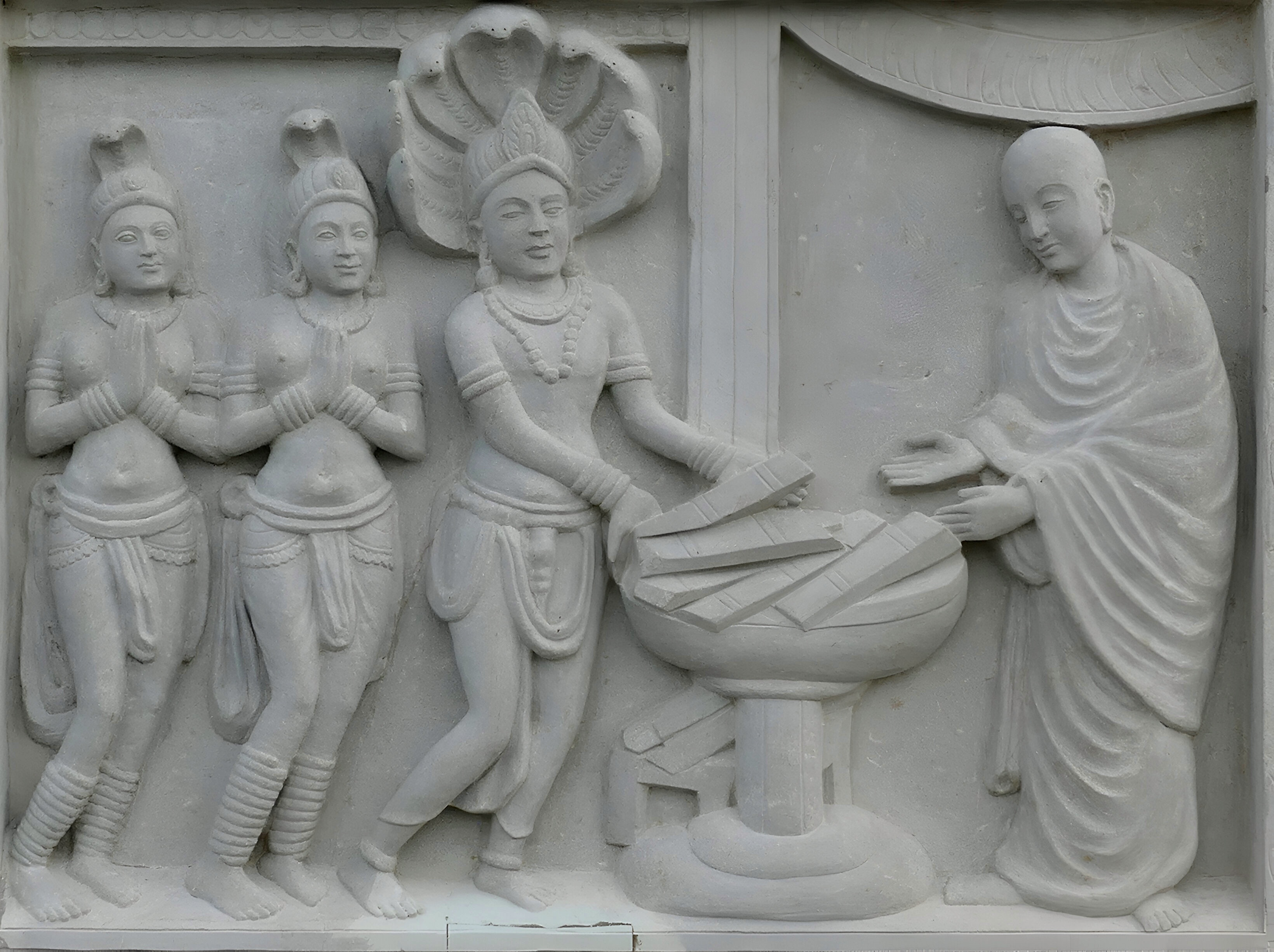
Nagarjuna Retrieves the Prajñaparamita Sutras, relief at Buddhavanam Stupa, Telangana. The Prajñaparamita texts are a major source for the Mahayana doctrine of emptiness.

A central theme of Nāgārjuna's writings, especially his philosophical texts, is the key Mahayana concept of śūnyatā (Sanskrit, translated into English as "emptiness"), which for Nāgārjuna means that all things are empty of svabhāva (inherent existence, intrinsic nature).

Jan Westerhoff notes that the meaning of svabhāva has metaphysical and cognitive dimensions. Metaphysically it is a kind of unchanging substance, a primary existent (dravyasat), an "objective and irreducible constituent of the world" which exists independently and by itself, without depending on anything else. This concept, which was defended in some way or another by Buddhist schools like Vaibhāṣika and by non-buddhist schools like Vaiśeṣika, is the main target of Nāgārjuna's arguments. Regarding the cognitive aspect, this relates to how sentient beings reify objects by mentally superimposing svabhāva, contributing to craving and suffering. It is only by deconstructing and letting go of our cognitive faults that we can attain liberation from suffering. Thus, Nāgārjuna's philosophy of emptiness is always done with this soteriological goal in mind.

For Nāgārjuna, it is not merely sentient beings that are without an unchanging self (ātman); all phenomena (dharmas) are without any svabhāva and thus without any underlying unchanging essence or substance. This is so because all things always arise dependent on other causes and conditions: not by their own power. Indeed, for Nāgārjuna, emptiness is just another way of speaking about the Buddhist doctrine of dependent arising (Sanskrit: pratītyasamutpāda). All phenomena are thus empty of being independently existent or having any independent being or nature. Nāgārjuna's "argumentative" or "reasoning" works (Sanskrit: yukti) focus on defending the doctrine of emptiness and refuting any substantialist or foundationalist theories of svabhāva, which include any nature that is not produced by causes (akrtaka), and which is not dependent on anything else.

To say that all things are 'empty' is to deny any kind of ontological foundation; therefore Nāgārjuna's view is often seen as a kind of ontological anti-foundationalism or a metaphysical anti-realism by modern philosophers.

=== Arguments against svabhāva theory ===
In Nāgārjuna's central philosophical work, the Mūlamadhyamakakārikā (MMK), he provides numerous arguments against svabhāva theory. Nāgārjuna never provides a single "master argument", instead he dismantles various arguments for svabhāva one by one throughout the various chapters of the MMK, which discuss topics such as causation, time, movement, change, mereology, personal identity, and conceptual dependence. This is what later came to be called the prāsaṅgika method, which relies on refutations that seek to show the unintended consequences (Sanskrit: "prāsaṅga") of the opponent's arguments and positions. In each of the chapters of the MMK, various substantialist theories on different philosophical topics are analysed, deconstructed and attacked.

Nāgārjuna is known for his use of the Indian logical tool of the tetralemma (Sanskrit: catuṣkoṭi, "four corners") to attack versions of substance theory. This schema relies on four propositions: something can be said to [1] exist (or be true), [2] not exist (or be false), [3] both 1 and 2 are affirmed together, or [4] 1 and 2 are both rejected. Nāgārjuna's arguments usually work systematically to negate all "corners" of this logical schema, leaving us without any views to hold on to, and ideally with a sense of apophatic peace.

=== Causation ===
Nāgārjuna begins his MMK with a discussion of causation. He analyses various ways of understanding cause and effect through the lens of svabhāva theory and shows how they are logically unsatisfactory. Nāgārjuna then applies similar types of arguments for other concepts in later chapters of the MMK. Understanding the arguments on causation used in the first chapter of the MMK then allows us to see how Nāgārjuna's Madhyamaka method functions and how the theory of emptiness is to be understood.

For Nāgārjuna, causes and effects are not completely distinct and independent objects or things, and they also do not function independently of the mind. His most famous analysis of causation distinguishes between four possible ways any thing or phenomenon (dharma) could arise or be produced, and then refutes each of these. These four possibilities are:

- Things arise from themselves (i.e. they are self-caused). This view was usually defended by arguing that the effect was already contained in the cause, or by saying that the effect and the cause are the same thing. Nāgārjuna argues against both views. In particular, he notes that since one does not observe effects within causes, this view is unfounded.
- Things arise from other things (causation from another). This is the most natural understanding of causation, defended by Abhidharma Buddhists and non-buddhists alike. But Nāgārjuna also rejects this position, arguing that cause and effect cannot be distinct in a substantial sense. This is because, the effect depends on the cause for its existence, and the cause also depends on the effect (at least conceptually, for it to be a cause, it must have an effect). Furthermore, he argues that if causes and effects truly were different substances then they could not be connected to each other, since two distinct substances cannot have a dependence relation.
- Things arise from both themselves and from other things. This can be explained as holding that a cause (e.g. marble) contains a potentiality (e.g. the potential to become a statue) within that is realised through supporting external conditions (like the actions of a sculptor). But Nāgārjuna argues that these distinctions do not exist substantially either, since the supporting conditions and the result do not exist apart from the cause, and thus they cannot be said to exist substantially and independently.
- Things arise from neither themselves nor from other things. This is usually presented as the view that things arise without causes. But this must be rejected because nothing appears to arise without some casual order. Thus this view would mean that knowledge of the world would be impossible even conventionally.

After showing the inadequacy of all four alternatives, Nāgārjuna posits that any substantialist view of cause and effect must be wrong. Rather than seeing causes and effects as independent, they must be seen as mutually interdependent, both notionally and existentially. That is to say, just as effects depend on their causes to exist, the very property of being a cause existentially depends on the property of it having effects (i.e. its existence as a cause depends on its effects, see MMK 4.3). Further, causes and conditions also depend on living beings and their concepts about the world, for it is living beings who cognitively carve up the world into things and their relations. Indeed, this notional and conceptual kind of dependence is seen as one of the most important dimensions of emptiness, since a common view of Mahayana is that all things are in some sense conceptual constructions (prajñapti).

Westerhoff observes that while causal relations imply lack of svabhāva in some way, Nāgārjuna's argument cannot stop there. After all, Ābhidharmikas saw no conflict between causation and svabhāva, and the dependence of effects upon causes does not necessarily mean that causation itself is a conceptual construction, i.e. it may still exist independently of human cognition. Therefore, for Nāgārjuna, the most profound understanding of emptiness is not merely that cause and effect are dependent on each other, but more importantly, that they are not independent of human cognition and conceptualization. As Westerhoff explains, "since the causal relation does not exist from its own side, is conceptually constructed, and therefore empty, each causally related object must be so constructed and therefore empty in the most profound sense of being conceptually constructed."

At the same time, rather than seeing emptiness as being a kind of nihilism which rejects that anything exists or functions at all, Nāgārjuna posits that emptiness and dependent arising are precisely the best explanation for how there can be anything at all. His arguments often turn the tables on the substance theorist by attempting to show that svabhāva theories actually lead to absurd conclusions and thus cannot explain how the world works. This idea that emptiness is the proper understanding of dependent arising and that only through the lack of svabhāva can one properly explain the central teachings of Buddhism, including the origin and cessation of suffering, is the basis of a famous verse in MMK Chapter 24 (verse 14) which states:

sarvaṃ ca yujyate tasya śūnyatā yasya yujyate
sarvaṃ na yujyate tasya śūnyaṃ yasya na yujyate
All is possible when emptiness is possible.
Nothing is possible when emptiness is impossible.

=== Knowledge ===
Another major philosophical topic which Nāgārjuna discusses is how to assess the proper instruments of epistemology, or the means of knowledge (Sanskrit: pramāṇa). This was a key topic in the philosophy of his time, and a major theme discussed by the non-buddhist Nyaya school. As with Nyaya thinkers, Nāgārjuna discusses four epistemic instruments: perception (pratyakṣa), inference (anumāna), analogy or comparison (upamāna), and reliable testimony (āgama), which are held to be able to establish the existence epistemic objects (prameyas). His main concern is how any set of epistemic instruments can be established or grounded. That is to say, how do we know that any epistemic instrument is a good guide for the existence of things in the world?

In Indian thought, there were various theories of how to ground epistemic instruments or pramāṇas. One view was that they were established by mutual coherence (see: coherentism). Nāgārjuna does not spend much time assaulting this view, since his Nyaya opponents generally rejected it, on the grounds that stories and fairy tales could be coherent while also being false. The second view is that pramāṇas are self-justified, or grounded in themselves, a view which avoids epistemic infinite regresses. Nāgārjuna argues against this view by pointing out that if this was true, a pramāṇa like visual perception could exist independently of all visual objects. But if this were the case then it would be able to perceive itself, functioning as its own object (for without an object, it would not be perception at all). But this leads to a problem: as with motion, perception takes time. Thus, "vision cannot see something that exists simultaneously with it (such as itself), since vision takes time too" (as per MMK 3:2–3). Nāgārjuna further argues that if pramāṇas were self-grounding or self-establishing, we would have no way to choose valid pramāṇas among the various possible means of knowledge found in the world. For example, if we were offered five different types of cameras, the only way to truly know if they were accurate instruments of photography would be to test them by photographing various objects in different ways. Then we would be able to know which physical qualities and properties are best for photography. In the same way, pramāṇas cannot be assessed and established independently of their epistemic objects (prameya).

The final position that Nāgārjuna deconstructs is that pramāṇas and prameyas establish each other. In this view, epistemic instruments establish an object and grant us knowledge of it. In turn, the objects establish the instruments via our interactions with the objects and our assessment of success in our pragmatic goals. The problem with this is that though it makes sense to say that an object like an apple might be justified by its epistemic instrument (visual perception), it is hard to see how the visual perception is established by an apple etc. Furthermore this creates a vicious circle of justification, since we would need previous access to the object before accepting that it can establish our visual perception, and this access can only be granted by our epistemic instrument that we seek to ground in the object. Thus, Nāgārjuna has his opponent present another view of mutual justification, which is to say that, as Westerhoff puts it "because the epistemic object is perceived, there must be something bringing about such a perception, and this is the epistemic instrument." In this view, the repeated successful knowings of apples now and in the past justifies our acceptance of visual perception as a useful perceiver of apples.

One issue with this view however is that now we need an epistemic instruments that grounds epistemic success in the first place, as we could have always have been having apple hallucinations which feel and taste like real apples. Nothing logically rules out that we have always been deceived by every apple we have ever experienced, though pragmatically we can argue that if we avoid procedures which are suspect and which we know have been unsuccessful in the past, we might be close to knowledge. A further and more serious problem is that this does not provide an account of epistemic instruments where pramāṇas exist substantially, with an inherent nature. The epistemic success of these procedures cannot just be based on successful action, since some cognitions are never acted upon. Thus we need to marry this theory with some account of coherence with other beliefs and cognitions, such as memories of past apples or of buying an apple. But now we would need a select set of fixed cognitions or beliefs to use to evaluate other cognitions, and here we now need to find a way to ground these other evaluative cognitions. The entire project has now become an epistemic regress where every element requires further grounding, and none of these elements seem to be able to have any svabhāva or independent existence of their own, even if they can be assessed as being pragmatically useful under certain circumstances.

Nāgārjuna’s epistemology is a key part of his theory of emptiness, since to acquire any knowledge of emptiness, we need to understand how to acquire knowledge in the first place and also what an object of knowledge even is. Nāgārjuna's major opponent is Nyāya epistemology, which argues that through certain epistemic procedures we can come to know that reality is made up of objective, mind-independent substances which can bear specific qualities. For Nāgārjuna meanwhile, nothing can be an epistemic instrument or object intrinsically, by its own powers. As Westerhoff explains, "the two have to be mutually established: the instrument establishes the object by giving us cognitive access to it, our successful interaction with the object establishes the instrument as a trustworthy route to the object." As such, epistemic instruments and objects are not so due to any intrinsic natures, but due to a relative process of conceptual construction and mental reflection. We form views about objects through percetions etc, and test them through action, and then we reassess our understanding of the object accordingly. Since pramāṇas and prameyas mutually establish each other in this relative and mutually dependent way, neither of them can exist by svabhāva.

=== Two truths ===
Nāgārjuna was also instrumental in the development of the two truths doctrine, which claims that there are two levels of truth in Buddhist teaching, the ultimate truth (paramārtha satya) and the conventional or superficial truth (saṃvṛtisatya). As Nāgārjuna writes in the twenty fourth chapter of the MMK:

8. The Dharma teaching of the Buddha rests on two truths: conventional truth and ultimate truth.

9. Who do not know the distinction between the two truths, they do not understand reality in accordance with the profound teachings of the Buddha.

10. The ultimate truth is not taught independently of customary ways of talking and thinking. Not having acquired the ultimate truth, nirvana is not attained.

For Nāgārjuna, the ultimate truth is the fact that everything is empty, and this includes emptiness itself ("the emptiness of emptiness"). While some (Murti, 1955) have interpreted this by positing Nāgārjuna as a neo-Kantian and thus making ultimate truth a metaphysical noumenon or an "ineffable ultimate that transcends the capacities of discursive reason", the more traditional and standard interpretation, defended by modern scholars like Westerhoff, Mark Siderits and Jay L. Garfield holds that Nāgārjuna's view is that "the ultimate truth is that there is no ultimate truth" (Siderits) and that Nāgārjuna is a "semantic anti-dualist" who posits that there are only conventional truths. Hence as Garfield explains:

Suppose that we take a conventional entity, such as a table. We analyze it to demonstrate its emptiness, finding that there is no table apart from its parts [...]. So we conclude that it is empty. But now let us analyze that emptiness [...]. What do we find? Nothing at all but the table's lack of inherent existence. [...]. To see the table as empty [...] is to see the table as conventional, as dependent.

Thus, when we understand the ultimate truth, "all one is left with is conventional truth" (Westerhoff), which is based on commonly accepted practices, conventions, language and concepts. While these inevitably distort and veil reality itself, there is no other way of perceiving and investigating the world but through these conventions, since it is these very conventional processes which generate the very idea of a world in the first place. This does not mean that one cannot pragmatically treat such conventions as being related to the world in some way and that one could not seek to further improve our understandings of the world. But ultimately these are still just convenient and useful fictions to the Madhyamaka anti-realist, since they would never accept that such conventional truths are grounded in a world that is independent of our concepts, cognition and interests.

Where does this leave emptiness? Is it not the ultimate truth that explains how things really always are? For Nāgārjuna, emptiness should never be seen as a ground, foundation or even an ultimate account of things that is independent of human concepts and conventions. Its real purpose is to dissolve our conceptual impositions of svabhāva on all phenomena. This absence of svabhāva has no existence of its own, apart from all empty things or sentient minds, nor is it a quality inherent in things. Thus, it is merely a corrective to wrong views, and, once it has dissolved all such wrong views, it then dissolves itself. Nāgārjuna thus states that holding a false view of emptiness by seeing it as an ultimate metaphysical reality is dangerous, "like a serpent wrongly held or a spell wrongly executed," it destroys the dull witted.

In articulating this view of the two truths doctrine in the Mūlamadhyamakakārikā, Nāgārjuna draws on and quotes an early Buddhist source (Kātyāyanagotrasūtra), which distinguishes definitive meaning (nītārtha) from interpretable meaning (neyārtha) and discusses a "teaching via the middle" between the extremes of existence and non-existence. (Note: Kātyāyanagotrasūtra: “Generally, Kātyāyana, this world relies on a duality of existence and non-existence. This world which relies on existence and non-existence is attached, grasping and bound. And this obstinate tendency of the mind to grasp and cling they don’t hold, they don’t accept, insist on or have a tendency to say: this is my self. This arising is disappointment arising; ceasing is disappointment ceasing—here he has no doubt, no uncertainty, and has independent knowledge of this.” “In this way there is right-view, Kātyāyana. In this way the Tathāgata teaches the understanding of right-view.” “Why is that? Arising in the world, Kātyayana, seen and correctly understood just as it is, shows there is no non-existence in the world. Cessation in the world, Kātyayana, seen and correctly understood just as it is, shows there is no permanent existence in the world.” “Thus avoiding both extremes the Tathāgata teaches a dharma by the middle path. “That is: this being, that becomes; with the arising of this, that arises. With ignorance as condition there is volition ...” as before for arising and cessation.)

=== Ethics ===
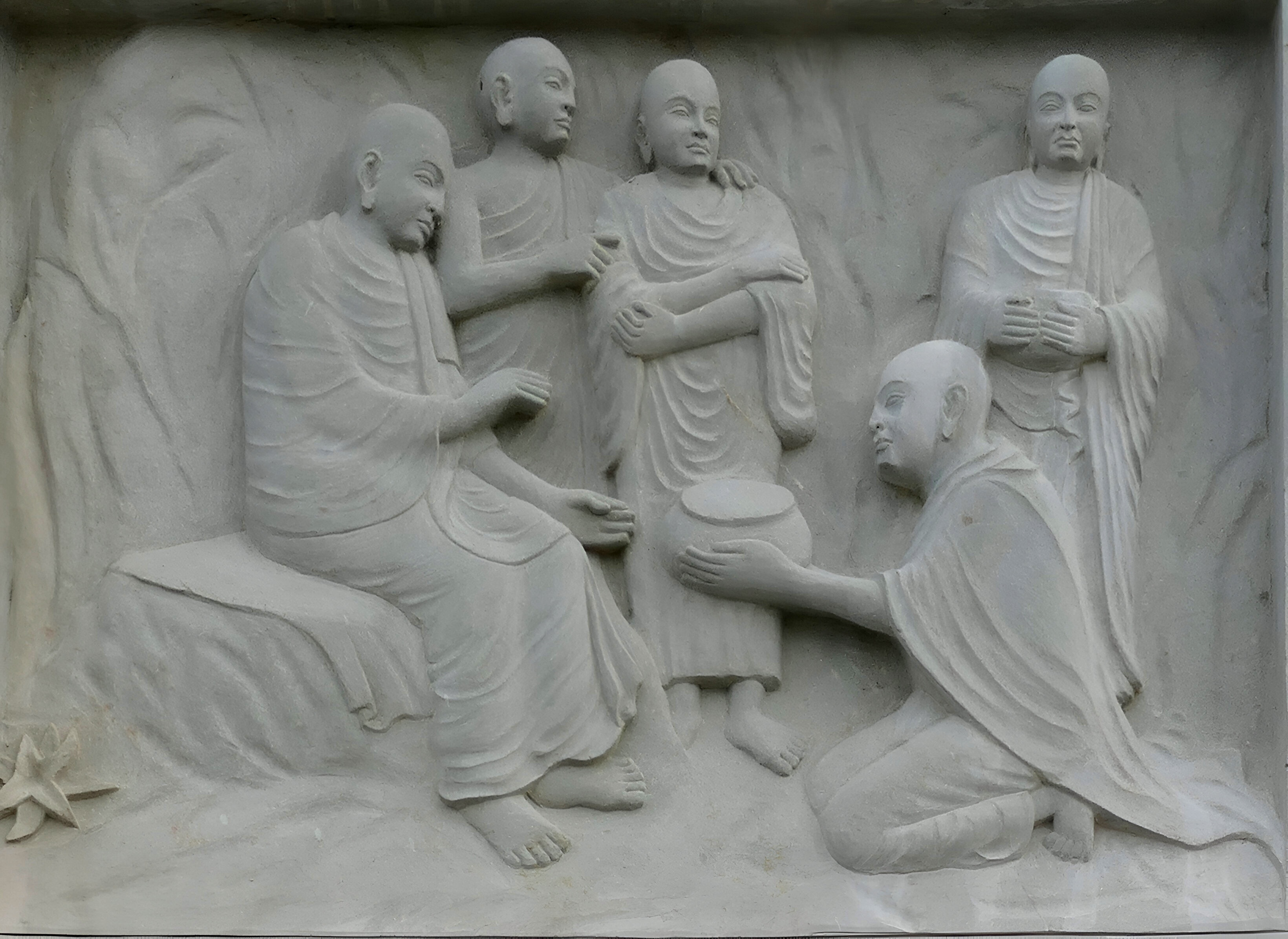
Nagarjuna and his pupil Aryadeva, Buddhavanam Stupa Drum Reliefs, Telangana

While Nāgārjuna is most well known for his philosophical theories, he also wrote numerous religious works, like the Ratnāvalī (Precious Garland), Suhṛllekha (Letter to a Good Friend) and Bodhisaṃbhāraśāstra (Requisites of Awakening). These texts discuss Mahayana Buddhism more broadly and present an overall ethical and religious framework in which ethics and faith are paramount.

Nāgārjuna's religious ethics focus on the bodhisattva path, the religious path of those who have set out to attain Buddhahood for the sake of all beings. The Ratnāvalī discusses ethics mainly from the point of view of a layperson, promoting classic Mahayana Buddhist virtues like generosity, non-harming and the six perfections (pāramitās). In this work, he makes a crucial distinction between two dimensions or aspects of the Dharma: (1) the Dharma of ascendance (abhyudaya, "rising up", success, prosperity), which refers to all the ways to gain happiness and good rebirths; and (2) the Dharma of transcendence or the Supreme Good (naiḥśreyasa), which he glosses as liberation (moksha) obtained through wisdom. These two aspects have a close hierarchical relationship, since the practice of the first leads to the second, as Nāgārjuna says in the beginning of the Ratnāvalī:

In whom there is first the Dharma of ascendance,
afterward arises the highest good,
since after reaching ascendance,
one proceeds gradually to the highest good.

Nāgārjuna continues, associating faith with the path of ascendance and wisdom with the path of the Supreme Good:

Here we maintain that ascendance is happiness (sukha),
and the highest good is liberation (moksha).
In brief, faith and wisdom are
the concise method for attaining them.

Through faith one partakes of the Dharma;
through wisdom, one truly understands.
Of these two, wisdom is foremost,
yet faith is its prerequisite.

Thus, while much of Nāgārjuna's writings focus on the wisdom aspect, i.e. understanding the doctrine of emptiness and dependent arising, he remains a religious writer for whom faith and ethics is a central part of the graduated path of the bodhisattva. For it is through faith (śraddhā) in the Dharma that one is led to perform acts of virtue (such as generosity) and gain merit. This in turn leads to good rebirths and other requisites for the cultivation of wisdom (such as health, access to Buddhist teachings, etc). Through the cultivation of wisdom, one can then attain the transcendent supreme good of nirvana. The Dharma of ascendance then, is understood to function more on the level of conventional truth, while the Dharma of transcendence relates to the ultimate truth of emptiness. Nāgārjuna also links these to the two accumulations of merit (puṇya-saṃbhāra) and knowledge (jñāna-saṃbhāra) respectively. The Ratnāvalī oscillates back and forth between these two central topics, showing how the Mahāyāna path includes these two interrelated aspects of Dharma and how they work together.

Rafal Stepien notes that Nāgārjuna's ethical teachings follow standard Mahāyāna Buddhist formulations such as the ten wholesome actions and are quite conventional in that regard. What makes his ethical system unique is how he explains ethics through his philosophy of emptiness, which attempts to do away with all "views" and any kind of metaphysical foundation. Nāgārjuna's ethics is thus based on emptiness itself, as well as on the soteriological efficacy of Buddhist virtues that, informed by the wisdom of emptiness, lead to nirvana. Stepien calls this an eirenic ethics (ethics of peace), grounded in emptiness, which is the very lack of foundations and is understood through the lack of all views (and thus, it is actually groundless). For Nāgārjuna, it is precisely this philosophy of emptiness which is uniquely adequate for the ethics of universal compassion, because emptiness dissolves the division between self and others and thus abandons the very possibility of selfish thoughts. For Nāgārjuna, virtuous actions are also skilful means (upaya), which lead one to nirvana, a state in which there is no action (karma) at all. Thus, like his metaphysics, Nāgārjuna's ethical system is one which ultimately dissolves itself in the end. That is to say, truly virtuous and compassionate actions unravel all action (all karma), including craving and attachment, just like the wisdom of emptiness unravels all views.

=== Relativity ===
Nāgārjuna also taught the idea of relativity; in the Ratnāvalī, he gives the example that shortness exists only in relation to the idea of length. The determination of a thing or object is only possible in relation to other things or objects, especially by way of contrast. He held that the relationship between the ideas of "short" and "long" is not due to intrinsic nature (svabhāva). This idea is also found in the Pali Nikāyas and Chinese Āgamas, in which the idea of relativity is expressed similarly: "That which is the element of light ... is seen to exist on account of [in relation to] darkness; that which is the element of good is seen to exist on account of bad; that which is the element of space is seen to exist on account of form."

=== Buddhahood and nirvana ===
The bulk of Nāgārjuna's writings discuss the emptiness of all sorts of conventional phenomena, such as the five aggregates, the self, change, desire, suffering and karma. However, Nāgārjuna also outlines the emptiness of even the highest Buddhist ideals, explaining that even the supreme goals of nirvana and buddhahood are empty of self-existence. Therefore, nothing whatsoever escapes Nāgārjuna's analysis of emptiness. That is to say, there is nothing at all which is not empty of svabhāva.

As such, chapter twenty two of the MMK begins by subjecting the Buddha to the same examination that the emptiness of the person was analysed with. By showing that the Buddha is neither identical with the five aggregates (body, feelings, perceptions, intentions, consciousness) nor distinct from them, and that the aggregates are not in the Buddha, nor is he in them, we cane see that there is ultimately no Buddha. The Buddha is dependent on the aggregates, which are themselves empty and dependently arisen, thus Buddha is empty of any substantial existence, having the same status as any other phenomena. Thus, according to Nāgārjuna, "The Tathagata is devoid of intrinsic nature; this world is devoid of intrinsic nature." Ultimately, the Buddha is also beyond all conceptualisations and linguistic distinctions, thus we cannot describe the Buddha as eternal, non-eternal, as both or neither. Likewise, we cannot say after his nirvana the Buddha exists, does not, both or neither.

As with the Buddha, so with nirvana, the supreme goal of Buddhism. Thus, in chapter twenty five of the MMK, Nāgārjuna analyses nirvana to show that it cannot have svabhāva. He further argues that nirvana cannot be accurately described with any statement that could apply ultimately, stating that nirvana is neither an existent (bhāva), a non-existence (abhāva), both or neither. Nirvana cannot be an existent thing because then it would dependent and conditioned, and nirvana is always described as unconditioned (asaṃskṛta). Nirvana also cannot be non-existent because then it would also be dependent, since absences depend on existence, they are defined by what they are not. Once he has rejected all possible views on the ontological status of nirvana, Nāgārjuna affirms that the status of the Buddha after death is an indeterminate question (avyakrta), relying on a classic Buddhist category.

Finally, in this nirvana chapter, Nāgārjuna also applies the same logic to the realm of suffering itself, samsara, arguing that the ultimate ontological status of both samsara and nirvana are equal in a famous passage (ch. 22, verses 19-20):

There is no distinction whatsoever between samsara and nirvana.
There is no distinction whatsoever between nirvana and samsara.
What is the limit of nirvana, that is the limit of samsara.
There is not even the finest gap to be found between the two.

Thus one cannot say that samsara and nirvana exist in some ultimate sense. Likewise we cannot say they do not exist, nor can we affirm nor reject both positions either. At this point, we reach of apophatic peace in which nothing can be said and our need to conceptualise everything stops. Nāgārjuna closes with the following key verse:

This stopping of cognising everything, of prapañca, is blissful. No dharma whatsoever was ever taught by the Buddha to anyone.

=== Pure Land teaching ===
Nāgārjuna caps the Suhṛllekha with a dedication of merit towards rebirth in higher realms, ultimately towards birth in Amitābha Buddha's Sukhavati pure land: "May you be born in a buddhafield, freed from illness, old age, attachment, and hatred, and may you become equal to Amitāyus, Protector of Worlds, with the Bhagavān Amitābha" (Verse 122). Further details of this pure land rebirth ideal are discussed in other sources attributed to Nāgārjuna, especially the Treatise on the Ten Bodhisattva Stages (Dasabhumika-vibhāsā). This text is an important work in East Asian Pure Land Buddhism, where it is seen as a foundational treatise establishing the Pure Land path and the distinction between the "easy" path and the "difficult" path. In the “Chapter on Easy Practice”, Nāgārjuna explains how relying on Amitābha Buddha to attain birth in the pure land of Sukhavati can be an "easy" method for attaining non-retrogression on the bodhisattvas path.

According to Nāgārjuna, a pure land (a pure buddhafield, Sanskrit: viśuddha-buddhakṣetra) is a realm of purification (vyavadāna) where there is no impurities, including the impurities of wrong views, conceptual proliferation (prapañca), and the impurity of karma, and where instead there is the pure wisdom of emptiness. In chapter five of the Dasabhumika, Nāgārjuna gives a general description of the qualities of the pure lands of the buddhas which includes "the complete presence of the dharmas associated with a buddha’s meritorious qualities and powers; The complete presence of the Dharma; The complete presence of śrāvaka disciples; The completeness of the bodhi tree; A world that is adorned; Beings that are well-endowed with good fortune; The abundant presence of beings capable of achieving liberation; The gathering of an immense congregation; And completeness in the powers of a buddha." Other qualities of the pure lands include: "rapid achievement of realization" for bodhisattvas, the complete presence of bodhisattvas which visit pure lands from throughout the cosmos, the absence of demonic maras, the presence of amazing miracles, the presence of an immeasurable radiance which heals all suffering and affliction.

Nāgārjuna also explains that on being born in a pure land, "there are beings who, upon seeing a buddha, become immediately able to dwell on the ground of irreversibility", since "when these beings see the body of a buddha, their minds are filled with great delight, joy, and pure happiness. Their minds immediately become focused and acquire a bodhisattva samādhi of this sort. Due to the power of this samādhi, they achieve a penetrating understanding of the true character of all dharmas." He also mentions that there beings who can enter the stage of certainty when they hear the name of a buddha. This occurs because "a buddha may have made an original vow" which helps beings achieve this. Chapter five also discusses how sentient beings may also attain rebirth in a pure land through hearing the name of a buddha, which may happen "if a person is possessed of much power arising from his resolute faith, if his roots of goodness have become completely developed, and if his karmic obstacles have already become exhausted, where this corresponds to the causes and conditions of the original vows of buddhas, when such a person hears the name of one of these buddhas, he will then be able to go forth to rebirth [in accordance with his wishes]."

In its influential chapter nine, the Dasabhumika explains how difficult following the eons long bodhisattva path can be and then compares the easy path to taking a boat:

There are innumerable gates to the buddha-dharma. Just as there are difficult and easy paths in this world, going over land being wearying while taking a boat over water is pleasant, just so are the bodhisattva paths.

The Treatise then discusses various buddhas and their pure lands, teaching the practice of reciting the names of the buddhas. Nāgārjuna singles out Amitābha, explains the qualities of his buddhafield of Sukhavati and provides a set of verses in praise of Amitābha. This passage later became a foundational text for Pure Land Buddhism, where Nāgārjuna (Chinese: 龍樹 lóng shù, lit. Dragon Tree) is considered a patriarch of the school.

== Comparative philosophy ==
=== Hinduism ===
Nāgārjuna was fully acquainted with the classical Hindu philosophies of Samkhya, Nyaya and Vaiseshika. Nāgārjuna assumes a knowledge of the definitions of the sixteen categories as given in the Nyaya Sutras, the chief text of the Nyaya school, and wrote a treatise on the pramanas where he reduced the syllogism of five members into one of three. In the Vigrahavyavartani, Nāgārjuna criticises the Nyaya theory of pramanas (means of knowledge).

=== Buddhism ===
Nāgārjuna was conversant with the scholasticism of the non-Mahayana Buddhist schools of Abhidharma and with the Mahāyāna sutra tradition. His arguments often attack positions held by the realist Sarvastivada Vaibhāṣika school, and some modern scholars like Walser have argued that Nāgārjuna was associated with the Mahāsāṃghikas. However, determining Nāgārjuna's affiliation with a specific nikāya is difficult, since his texts do not defend sect specific doctrines and never mention any specific Buddhist sect as being Nāgārjuna's. If the most commonly accepted attribution of texts (that of Christian Lindtner) holds, then Nāgārjuna was clearly a Māhayānist, as he references Mahāyāna texts, but his philosophy also closely relies on Sanskrit Śrāvaka texts ( Āgamas). Nāgārjuna may have arrived at his positions from a desire to achieve a consistent exegesis of the Buddha's doctrine as recorded in the Sanskritic Āgamas and Prajñaparamita texts. In the eyes of Nāgārjuna, the Buddha was not merely a forerunner, but the very founder of the Madhyamaka system. David Kalupahana sees Nāgārjuna as a philosophical successor to the scholar-monk Moggaliputta-Tissa in being a champion of the middle-way and a reviver of the original ideals of the Buddha.

=== Pyrrhonism ===
Because of the high degree of similarity between Nāgārjuna's philosophy and Pyrrhonism, particularly the surviving works of Sextus Empiricus, According to Thomas McEvilley this is because Nagarjuna was likely influenced by Greek Pyrrhonist texts imported into India. Pyrrho of Elis (c. 360–270 BCE), the founder of this school of sceptical philosophy, was himself influenced by Indian philosophy. Pyrrho travelled to India with Alexander the Great's army and studied with Indian sages he termed gymnosophists. According to Christopher I. Beckwith, Pyrrho's teachings are based on Buddhism, because the Greek terms adiaphora, astathmēta and anepikrita in the Aristocles Passage resemble the Buddhist three marks of existence. According to him, the key innovative tenets of Pyrrho's scepticism were only found in Indian philosophy at the time and not in Greece. However, other scholars, such as Stephen Batchelor and Charles Goodman question Beckwith's conclusions about the degree of Buddhist influence on Pyrrho.

=== Modern thinkers ===
Nāgārjuna came to the attention of modern university scholarship through the modern field of Buddhist studies. Numerous interpretations of Nāgārjuna were offered by Buddhist studies scholars, East and West, including Kantian idealism (Stcherbatsky and T. R. V. Murti), nihilism, relativism, and pragmatism (Kalupahana). More recently, modern Western philosophers and thinkers have begun to study Nāgārjuna's works from the point of view of philosophy and even physics, rather than from a purely Buddhist studies perspective.

Several modern English language analytical philosophers like Graham Priest, Jay L. Garfield, Mark Siderits and Jan Westerhoff have studied Nāgārjuna and drawn on his insights for their own philosophical work. Westerhoff's The Non-Existence of the Real World (2020) is a modern take on Nāgārjunian anti-foundationalism, while Priest's Beyond the limits of thought (2002) contains a chapter on Nāgārjuna.

In his book Helgoland, the Italian theoretical physicist Carlo Rovelli mentions how Nāgārjuna influenced his thinking on his relational interpretation of quantum mechanics. Another modern physicist who was influenced by Nāgārjuna is the American David Ritz Finkelstein. In particular, Finkenlstein developed a theory of "universal relativity" which saw all physical phenomena was relative.

== See also ==
- Acharya Nagarjuna University
- Aryadeva
- Buddhapālita
- Buddhism
- Kamalasila
- Middle Way
- Śāntarakṣita
- Sun Simiao
- Śūnyatā
- Yogachara-Madhyamaka
