= Gellu Srinivas Yadav =

Telangana politician

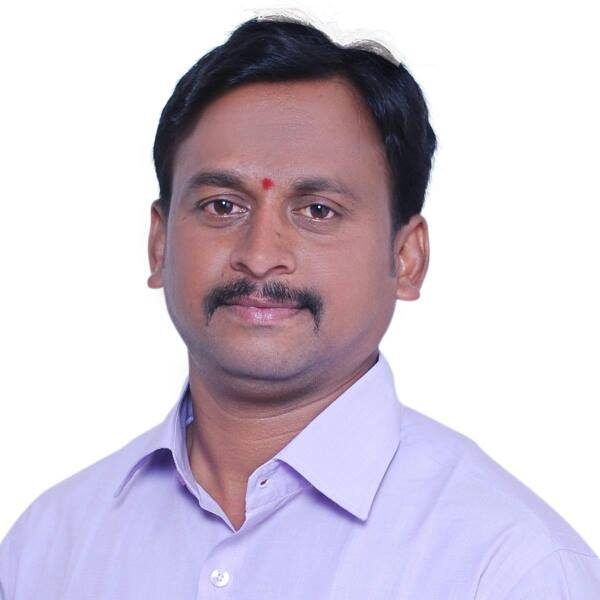

former chairman of the Telangana State Tourism Development Corporation

Personal details
- Born: 21 August 1983 (age 43) Himmatnagar, Veenavanka mandal, Karimnagar district, Telangana
- Party: Bharat Rashtra Samithi
- Spouse: Gellu Swetha
- Parent(s): Gellu Mallaiah, Lakshmi

Gellu Srinivas Yadav is an Indian Politician from Bharat Rashtra Samithi. He is currently the state president of the student wing of the Bharat Rashtra Samithi (BRS Vidyarthi).

Gellu Srinivas Yadav was appointed by the Chief Minister KCR, as the new chairman of the Telangana State Tourism Development Corporation for a period of two years on 4 April 2023.

== Early life and education ==
Gellu Srinivas Yadav was born to Gellu Mallaiah and Lakshmi in Himmatnagar village, Veenavanka mandal, Karimnagar district, Telangana. He completed his primary education in Veenavanka. He completed his BA at A. V. College, Domalguda staying at the Government BC Welfare Hostel in Amberpet, Hyderabad. Gellu Srinivas Yadav completed an MA (Folk Arts) at the Telugu University and additional degrees: MA (Political Science) from Osmania University and an LLB. He is currently pursuing a PhD in Political Science at Osmania University, doing research on the topic ‘Telangana Movement - The Role of KCR’.

== Political life ==
During his educational pursuits, Gellu Srinivas Yadav participated in protests with BC Welfare Association President R. Krishnaiah on issues related to Backward Class students. He was elected as President of Govt. B.C. Hostel, Amberpet (2003 to 2006).

Gellu Srinivas Yadav joined the TRS party during the formation of the party in 2001. He was one of the founding members of the Telangana Rashtra Samithi Vidyarthi (TRSV). He was the TRSV President of AV College in Domalguda (2003-2006), TRSV President of Telugu University (2006-2007), General Secretary of Telangana Student Joint Action Committee (JAC). He became Osmania University TRSV President in 2011 and TRSV State President in 2017.

TRS Party has named Gellu Srinivas Yadav as the party candidate for the Huzurabad by-election. He was defeated by Eatala Rajender of the Bharatiya Janata Party (BJP), in the end losing by 23855 votes.

== As Election Coordinator ==
In the 2006 Sircilla Assembly, Karimnagar Lok Sabha by-election, Gellu Srinivas Yadav acted as the Student Wing Coordinator He was in charge of the student wing of the Jadcherla Assembly in 2008 and campaigned for the 2009 Huzurabad Assembly. Gellu Srinivas served as the student wing coordinator in the Kolhapur Assembly constituency by-election in 2012 under the leadership of Koppula Eshwar. He was in charge of the Old Malakpet Division in the Greater Hyderabad Municipal Corporation elections in 2020.
