= Elbaka =

Indian Village

Elbaka is a village in the Veenavanka mandal of Karimnagar district in the Indian state of Telangana.
