= Udaynandan Reddy =

Founder and CEO of Yupp TV

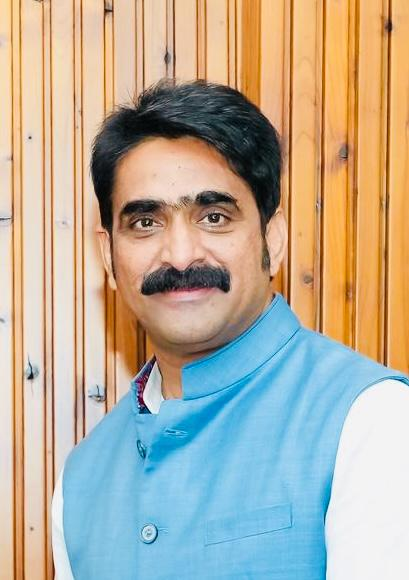
Padi Uday Nandan Reddy Padi Uday Nandan Reddy
- Born: Telangana, India
- Education: Bachelor of Engineering; Executive MBA (Finance)
- Alma mater: Delhi College of Engineering
- Occupations: Founder & CEO, YuppTV and Turito

Padi Uday Nandan Reddy is the founder and CEO of Yupp TV, an internet-only television platform for Indians living abroad. Before founding Yupp TV in 2007, he served as a Director for Nortel.

Padi Uday Nandan Reddy was born in a small village of Veenavanka near Karimnagar town in Telangana, India. He did most of his high school at Government Junior College in Hanamkonda. He studied engineering in electronics and telecommunication at Delhi College of Engineering, acquiring a BE degree. He eventually also pursued an executive MBA program in finance from Kellogg School of Management.

== Career ==
He founded YuppTV in 2007 to create an over-the-top (OTT) content provider of South Asian content and has more than 250 live TV channels. In September 2018, Reddy also founded Turito Inc which is a live learning platform for the preparation of exams such as SAT, ACT, AP, etc.

== Philanthropy ==
Padi Uday Nandan Reddy created the Modern Village Vision 2020 that began its work in the same year in Reddy's birthplace Veenavanka village in Telangana and works in the field of healthcare and education.
