= Sutrasamuccaya =

The Sūtrasamuccaya ('Compendium of Scriptures') is a collection of excerpts from various Buddhist Sutras. The Sūtrasamuccaya is extant in Chinese and Tibetan versions. According to the Chinese and Tibetan traditions, this anthology is attributed to Nagarjuna.

Alex Wayman (1997: p. 86) in making reference to the Lankavatara Sutra and the Madhyamika holds that:

...as the Lankavatāra-sutra is cited several times, and the Mādhyamika Nāgārjuna surely precedes this scripture, it is highly unlikely that this Sūtrasamuccaya is by Nāgārjuna. The fourth century AD is the earliest possible period for such a compendium.

== Content ==
(1) The utmost rareness of a Buddha's appearance

(2) The utmost rareness of being born a human

(3) The rareness of obtaining an auspicious rebirth

(4) The rareness of having trust

(5) The rareness of aspiring after Buddhahood

(6) The rareness of great compassion

(7) The rareness of forsaking obstructive conditions

(8) The rareness of really serious Dharma-practice on the part of householders

- (a) The Dharma-practice of householder-bodhisattvas
- (b) Wrong practice, the evil of taking life, etc.
- (c) Further wrong practice on the part of laymen—attachment to life, riches, etc.
- (d) Spiritual friends as prerequisites for really serious Dharma-practice

(9) The utmost rareness of beings who are truly and resolutely intent on the tathagatas' complete nirvana

(10) The utmost rareness of beings who are resolutely intent on the ekayana

(11) The utmost rareness of beings who progress in the direction of a Buddha's and bodhisattva's sublime and exalted position

== See also ==
- Buddhist texts

== Bibliography ==
- Bhikkhu Pasadika (1998), Nagarjuna’s Sutrasamuccaya, (Tibetan), Akademisk Forlag Kobenhavn.
- Chr. Lindtner (Paperback – May 31, 2011), Nagarjuniana: Studies in the Writings and Philosophy of Nagarjuna (Buddhist Tradition Series), Motilal Banarsidass.
- Bhikkhu Pasadika (1982), Prolegomena to an English Translation of the Sūtrasamuccaya, Heidelberg.
- Pāsādika, B. (1978–82), The Sūtrasamuccaya: An English Translation from the Tibetan Version of the Sanskrit Original, Joinville-le-Pont, Paris: Linh-So'n - publication d'études bouddhologiques, vol. 2-20.
- Nagarjuna (Auteur), Georges Driessens (Traduction), Le Livre de la chance, Seuil – 15 janvier 2003, ISBN 978-2020516495.
