= Buddhavanam =

Buddhist theme park in Nagarjuna Sagar, Telangana, India

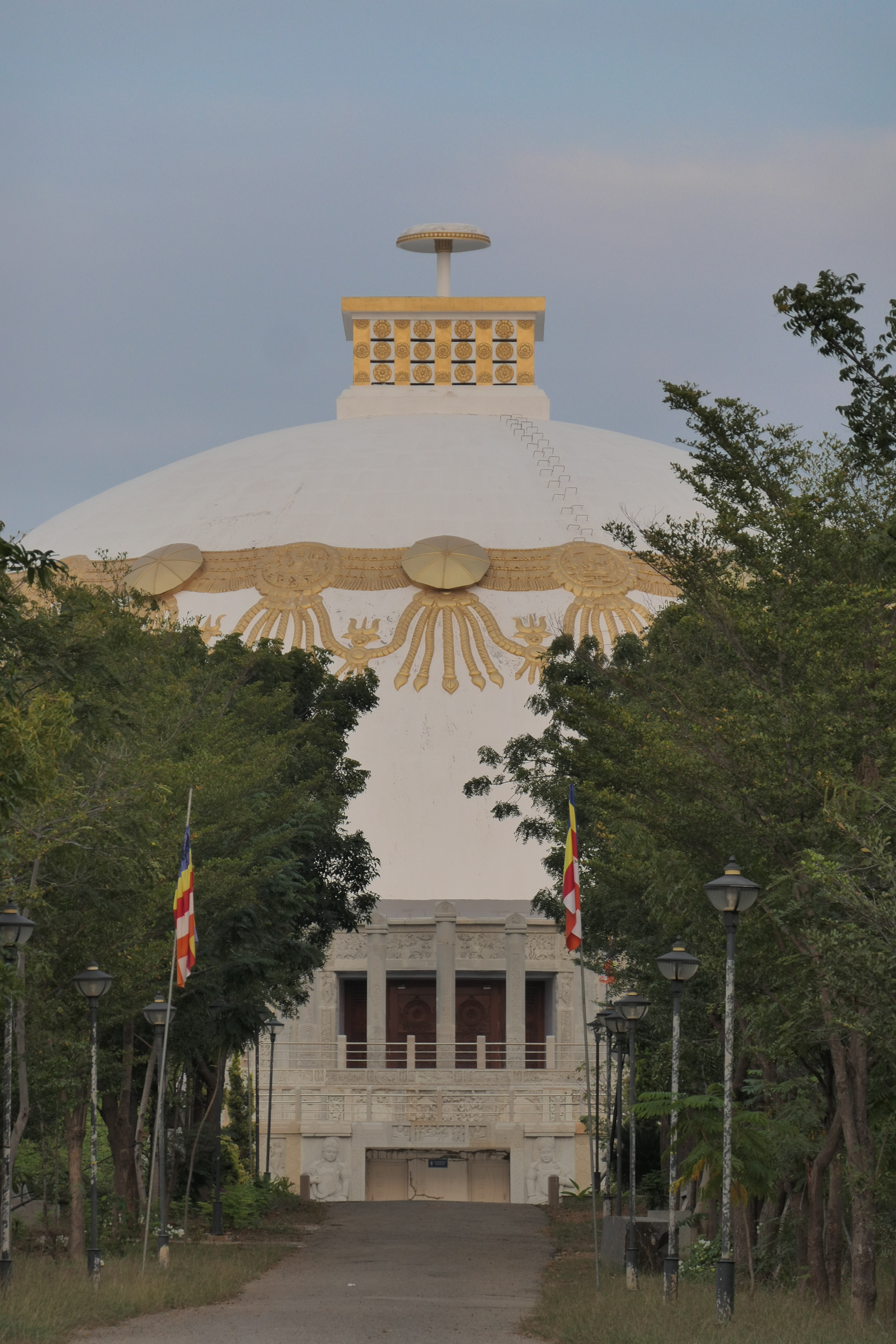
- Approach to Maha Stupa

- Location within Telangana
- Interactive map of Buddhavanam
- Type: theme park
- Location: Nagarjuna Sagar, Telangana, India
- Coordinates: 16°34′32″N 79°18′42″E
- Area: 22 acres (8.9 ha)
- Operator: Telangana Tourism Development Corporation
- Open: perennial open
- Status: Active

Buddhavanam is a tourism project in Nagarjuna Sagar, Telangana created by the Telangana Tourism Development Corporation. The project was sanctioned by the Government of India viz., Integrated Development of Nagarjunasagar as part of Lower Krishna valley Buddhist circuit with a view to attract large number of domestic and foreign tourists particularly from the South-East Asian countries.

== About ==
The areas around the Nagarjuna Sagar a reservoir formed due to the construction of the dam across the river Krishna was known as Nagarjuna Konda or Sriparvata - Vijayapuri, once served as capital city of the Ikshvaku dynasty, which ruled Andhradesa during the 3rd and 4th centuries A.D. Nagarjuna Konda was named after the famous Buddhist scholar and Madhyamika philosopher Acharaya Nagarjuna. Nagarjunakonda was a centre of Mahayana Buddhism, where many of the Buddhist sects had their monasteries, shrines and Stupas built to propagate the Dhamma.

Excavation conducted at Nagarjunakonda between 1954 and 1960 have revealed the existence of a Maha Stupa, Votive Stupas, Chaityas, Silamandapas and a good number of Buddhist sculptural panels and antiquities. The structures exposed also included a palace complex and a few Brahmanical temples built of bricks. The sculptural panels were depicted with the major events of the life of the Buddha and Jataka stories. As these vestiges were threatened for the submergence in the Nagarjunasagar reservoir, most of the structures were reconstructed on the Nagarjunakonda Island and at Anupu, a ferry point on the right bank of the river Krishna. The antiques including the holy relics of the Buddha recovered are displayed in the island museum for the benefit of the visitors.

== Features ==
The Telangana Tourism Development Corporation has acquired an extent of 279 acres of land on the northern bank of the river Krishna at Nagarjuna Sagar for Sriparvatarama (Buddhavanam) a Buddhist Theme Park.

=== Entrance plaza ===
The entrance plaza of Sriparvatarama is a square having eight quadrants with four openings. All the quadrants are embellished with panels with relief sculpture depicting Asthamangala (eight auspicious) symbols, Buddha in animals, birds, bodhi tree and Mithunas (amorous couples); the central themes include Buddhapada, pillar of, carrying the crown (hair) of Siddhartha, Naga Muchlinda. Worship of holy relic and Siddhartha carrying a mighty bow.

At the centre of the plaza stands on octagonal basement an octagonal column carrying the Dharma Chakra whose 24 spokes depict different virtues. Dharmachakra is Ashoka's contribution to the Buddhist art. At the base of the pillar on all the four sides are half-lotus medallions are carved.

=== Buddhacharita vanam (Life of the Buddha ) ===
Major events from the life of the Buddha are displayed in Buddhacharita Vanam - the birth of the Siddhartha in Lumbini, Maha parinirvana or the Great Departure of Siddhartha, Sambodhi or Enlightenment, Dharmachakra pravartana or the turning of the wheel of the Dharma or preaching the first sermon and The Great Extinction or Mahaparinirvana. Buddhapada with asthamangala symbols carved in green limestone is also displayed at the entrance of the park. All the five major events are represented in free-standing bronzes.

The legend surrounding the birth of Siddhartha depicts Mayadevi under the sal tree and the just born Siddhartha taking seven steps and declaring that this is his last birth! Mahabhinishkramana (Great Departure) depicts Siddhartha leaving the palace on the back of his horse, Kantaka. The sculpture of Samyak Sambodhi depicts the enlightenment of Siddhartha and his transformation into a Buddha. The Buddha is seated in dhyana mudra under the Bodhi (Pipal) tree at Buddhadhgaya. The Sculpture Dharmachakra Parvartana depicts Buddha seated in the deer park preaching the first sermon to the Pancha Vargiya Bhikkhus, the five seekers who were earlier associated with Sidhhartha in spiritual pursuit. The Sculpture of Mahaparinirvana depicts the Great Extinction of the Buddha. Buddha is seen in a reclining posture keeping his head on the right hand. The pedestal is depicted with the scenes of Subaddha (Last Disciple), the coffin, monks and the common folk of Kusinara where the event took place.

=== Maha Stupa ===
(Recreation of Amaravati Stupa)

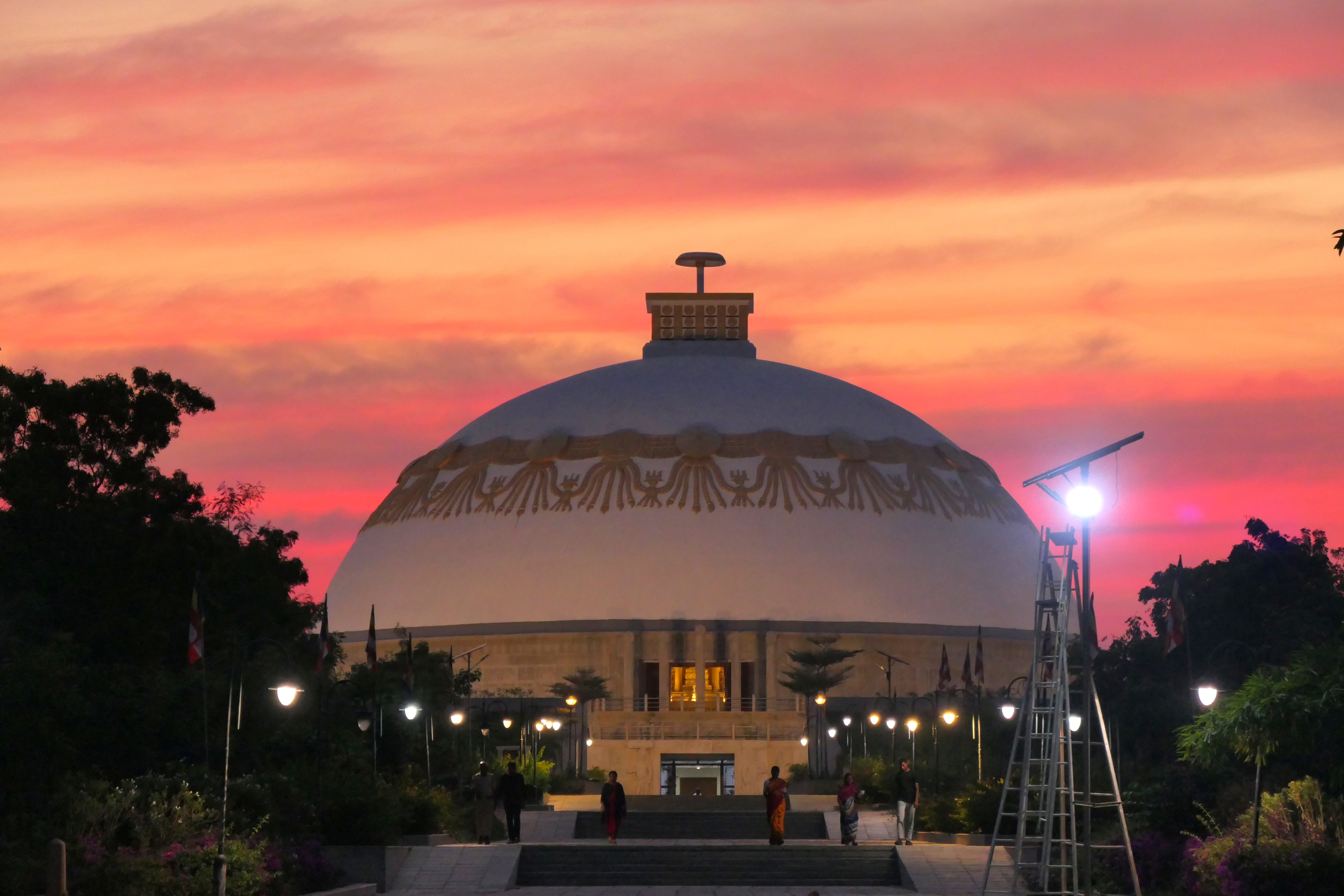
Maha Stupa

At the core of Sriparvata Arama project, is a stupa built according to the dimensions and architecture of the original Amararama Stupa which was the biggest stupa in Dakshinapatha or South India.

The stupa has a Vedika (drum), Dome and a Harmika on its top. Ayaka Platforms are built on four cardinal sides of the stupa on which stand the five Ayaka pillars corresponding to the five important events in the life of the Buddha. The ornate wall of the Mahastupa vedika is intricately carved with the scenes from Buddha's life and ministry and important kings of the period. The upper level dome portion is encased with sculptural panels depicting the Theravada Buddhist symbols like the Stupa, the throne, Bodhi tree, pillar of fire and Jataka stories; the events from the life of the Buddha are sculpted in a chronological order. On the ground floor of the stupa are a museum of Buddhist Heritage with Buddhist antiquities and 100 year old, copies of Ajanta frescoes, an amphitheatre and interpretation centre.

Artmorf is entrusted to sculpt the various relief panels in its original scale recreating its full glory. Sandstone reliefs will be individually crafted and veneered on the stupa exterior. On its completion the sculpture project will surpass most religious structures in the number of human figures carved in sandstone onto a single project.

=== Jataka park ===
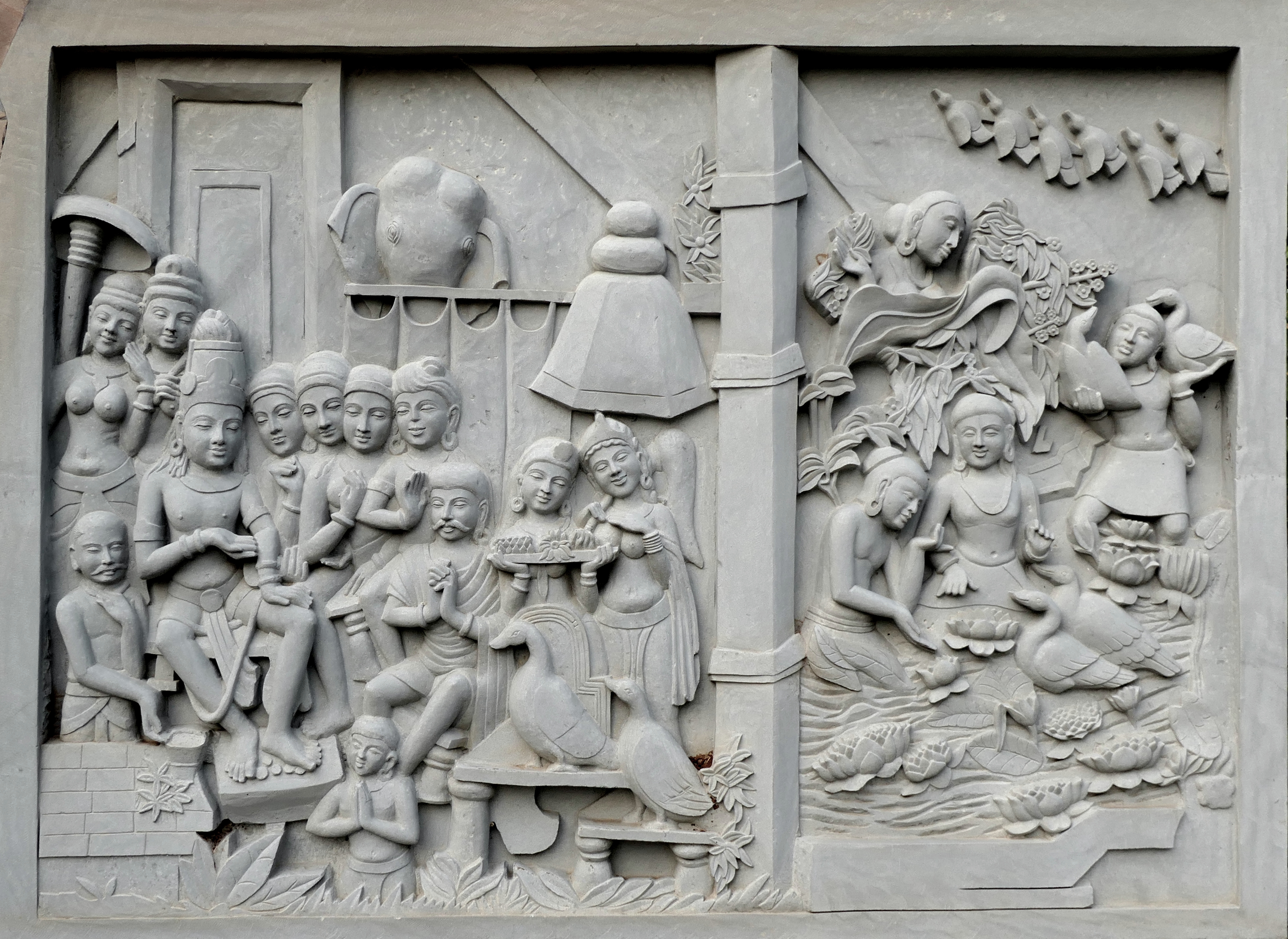
Mahahamsa Jataka relief

According to Buddhist belief, Bodhisattva goes through several lives practicing ten paramis or perfections before he is finally born as Siddhartha, attains enlightenment and becomes a Buddha. These stories about the previous births of Bodhisattva are illustrated in 547 jatakas. The Buddha himself referred to the jatakas while giving sermons at Shravasti, Vaishali, Rajagriha and other places of his ministry. The practice of ten perfections (dasaparamita) required for the Buddhahood are exalted in the jataka stories. The perfections are Generosity (Dana), Virtue (Sila), Patience (kshanti), Courage (Virya) Concentration (Dhyana), Wisdom (Prajna), Renunciation (tyaga), Truth (satya), Loving kindness (karuna) and Equanimity (samata). Also described in the well known Maha Hamsa Jataka Story is the principle of right governance or dasa rajadharma. The jataka stories exemplified by the lives of the Bodhisattva provide guidance to practicing Buddhists in everyday living.

Jataka stories have been an integral part of Buddhist Culture. It is customary for practicing Buddhists to listen to the monks narrating the Jataka stories on full-moon days. They are very popular in India, Sri Lanka, Burma, Nepal and Cambodia and other Buddhist countries.

40 Selected Jataka stories have been carved in high relief onto warm sandstone by artmorf sculptors. The relief sculptures narrate stories of the previous births of the Buddha. In India, Jataka tales are portrayed in Gandhara, Mathura and Amaravati schools of Art. The 40 Jataka stories are selected from various Buddhist sites such as Amaravati, Sriparvata (Nagarjuni konda), Goli, Phanigiri and other sites.

The Jatakas illustrated in the park, include Dipankara, Kattahari, Matakabatta, Nalapana, Vanarindha, Rsya Sringa, Sasa, Ahigundika, Dighitkosala, Kalinga, Ghata Panditha, Kunala, Kakati, Mahapaduma, Maha Hamsa, Sibi, Matanga, Sankhapala, Mahasuttasoma, Vidurapanditha, Nigrodhamiga, Chaddanta, Kurma Avadana, Mandhata, Mahakapi, Champeya, Syama, Maha Ummagga, Ashwamukhi, Dasaratha, Kavikumara, Suvarna Prabhasa (Mora), Losaka, Matsya, Kurungamirga, Mahisa, Timingala, Hasti, Simhalavadana and Vessantara.

=== Stupa vanam (miniature Stupa park) ===
The segment called Stupa vanam displays miniature stupas (replicas) from the Buddhist sites of India and South-East Asian countries. The stupas evolved from the style of the old funeral mounds of India and influenced the architecture of the domes of West Asia, particularly Persia. While the Indian Stupas are budbudha or bubble-shaped, they evolved in different architectural styles in other Buddhist countries.

An attempt is made to present the replicas of the stupas of different parts of India - Sanchi, Sarnath, Ajanta, Karle and Manikyala and other countries. Replicas of the stupas from Top Darra (North western Frontier), Mirpur-Khas (Pakistan), Anuradhapura (Sri Lanka), Phra Pathom Chedi (Thailand), Chorten (Tibet), Boudhanath (Nepal), Shwedagon (Myanmar) and Pagoda (China) are built in their styles of architecture for the benefit of the visitors. This park is still developing and it is yet to create replicas of great monuments like the Borobodur of Indonesia, Japan etc.

=== Avukana Buddha statue ===
The Government of Sri Lanka, Ministry of Culture and Buddha Sasana has donated a replica of the original granite Buddha statue located in Avukana village near Kekirawa in North central Sri Lanka carved in the 5th century A.D when king Dhatusena was ruling. The statue is cast in ferro-cement(?). Sri Lanka monks have built and installed the statue here at Sriparvatarama. It is a standing Buddha statue in Abhaya mudra and the closely worn robe is elaborately shown. The buddha's body is straight and the left hand holds the robe at the left shoulder. The right hand is raised above the right shoulder, with the palm facing left. Avukana Buddha Statue is perhaps the best example of a standing Buddha statues which are mostly found in South India.

== See also ==
- Nagarjunakonda
