= David Seyfort Ruegg =

Tibetan Buddhist writer (1931–2021)

- Born: August 1, 1931; Binghamton, New York, U.S.
- Died: February 2, 2021 (aged 89); London, England
- Scientific career
- Fields: Indo-Tibetan Buddhist studies
- Workplaces: School of Oriental and African Studies, University of London
- Doctoral students: Jan Westerhoff

David Seyfort Ruegg (August 1, 1931 – February 2, 2021) was an American-British Buddhologist with a long career, extending from the 1950s to the present. His specialty was Madhyamaka philosophy, a core doctrine of Mahayana Buddhism.

== Education ==
Ruegg graduated from École des Hautes Etudes in 1957, with degrees in historical science and Sanskrit. He published his thesis "Contributions à l'histoire de la philosophie linguistique indienne" ("Contributions to the History of Indian Linguistic Philosophy") in 1959. He received a second doctorate in linguistics from the Sorbonne in Paris, where his thesis was "La théorie du tathâgatagarbha et du gotra : études sur la sotériologie et la gnoséologie du bouddhisme" ("The Theory of Gotra and Tathâgatagarbha: A Study of the Soteriology and Gnoseology of Buddhism"), with a second half thesis on Buton Rinchen Drub's approach to tathâgatagarbha.

== Career ==
Ruegg joined the faculty of the Ecole Francaise d'Extreme Orient in 1964, where he researched the history, philology and philosophy of India, Tibet and Buddhism. From 1966 to 1972, Ruegg occupied the Chair of Languages and Cultures of India and Tibet at Leiden University. His predecessor was Jan Willem de Jong and his successor was Tilmann Vetter. He then became associated with the School of Oriental and African Studies, University of London. Ruegg was president of the International Association of Buddhist Studies (IABS) from 1991 to 1999.

L. S. Cousins called Ruegg "certainly the leading scholar today" on the subject of tathâgatagarbha doctrine.

== Death ==
Ruegg died from complications of COVID-19 in London on February 2, 2021, during the COVID-19 pandemic in England. He was 89.

== Publications ==
- Contributions à l'histoire de la philosophie linguistique indienne, Paris, Éd. de Boccard (Public. de l'Institut de civilisation indienne, 7). 1959
- The life of Bu ston Rin po che, Roma, Istituto Italiano per il Medio ed Estremo Oriente. 1966
- The study of Indian and Tibetan thought: some problems and perspectives, Inaugural lecture, Chair of Indian Philosophy, Buddhist Studies and Tibetan, University of Leiden, E. J. Brill. 1967
- La théorie du tathâgatagarbha et du gotra : études sur la sotériologie et la gnoséologie du bouddhisme, Paris, EFEO (PEFEO, 70). 1969
- Le traité du tathâgatagarbha de Bu ston Rin chen grub, Paris, EFEO (PEFEO, 88). 1973
- The literature of the Madhyamaka school of philosophy in India, Wiesbaden, Otto Harrassowitz (History of Indian Literature, 7/1). 1981
- Buddha-nature, Mind and the problem of Gradualism in a comparative perspective: On the transmission and reception of Buddhism in India and Tibet (Jordan Lectures 1987), London, SOAS, University of London. 1989
- Ordre spirituel et ordre temporel dans la pensée bouddhique de l'Inde et du Tibet, Paris, Collège de France (Public. de l'Institut de civilisation indienne, 64). 1995
