= Jan Westerhoff =

German professor of Buddhist Philosophy and orientalist

Jan Christoph Westerhoff is a German philosopher and orientalist with specific interests in metaphysics and the philosophy of language. He is currently Professor of Buddhist Philosophy in the Faculty of Theology and Religion of the University of Oxford.

== Early life and education ==
Westerhoff was educated at the Annette-von-Droste-Hülshoff Gymnasium, a Gymnasium in Düsseldorf, Germany. He studied philosophy at Trinity College, Cambridge, graduating with a first class Bachelor of Arts (BA) degree in 1999. He continued his studies of philosophy at Trinity and completed a Master of Philosophy (MPhil) degree in 2000. He undertook postgraduate research at the Faculty of Philosophy, University of Cambridge; his doctoral supervisor was Michael Potter. He completed his Doctor of Philosophy (PhD) degree in 2003, with a doctoral thesis titled "An inquiry into the notion of an ontological category". He undertook research for a second doctorate, this time in Oriental studies, at the School of Oriental and African Studies, University of London (SOAS). He completed his second PhD in 2007 with a doctoral thesis titled "Nagarjuna's madhyamaka: A philosophical investigation".

== Academic career ==
He was previously a research fellow in philosophy at the City University of New York, a seminar associate at Columbia University, a junior research fellow at Linacre College, a junior lecturer in the philosophy of mathematics at the University of Oxford, a university lecturer in religious ethics at the University of Oxford, a Fellow of Lady Margaret Hall and a research associate at SOAS.

=== Research ===
He is a specialist in metaphysics and Indo-Tibetan philosophy. In particular, his research focuses on the philosophy of the early Indian Mahāyāna Buddhist thinker, Nāgārjuna, with comprehensive books such as Nagarjuna's Madhyamaka. His research interests also include the history of ideas in the sixteenth and seventeenth centuries. His most recent research interests focus on the history of solipsism.

== Selected works ==
=== Books ===
- The Non-Existence of the Real World. (Oxford University Press, 2020, 384 pp., ISBN 9780198847915)
- Crushing the Categories: Nagarjuna's Vaidalyaprakarana. (Somerville, MA: Wisdom Publications, 2018, ISBN 9781949163001)
- The Golden Age of Indian Buddhist Philosophy. (Oxford: Oxford University Press, 2018, ISBN 9780198732662)
- Reality: A Very Short Introduction. (Oxford: Oxford University Press, 2011, ISBN 0199594414)
- The Dispeller of Disputes: Nagarjuna's Vigrahavyavartani. (Oxford: Oxford University Press, 2010)
- Twelve Examples of Illusion. (Oxford: Oxford University Press, 2010)
- (co-authored with The Cowherds) Moonshadows: Conventional Truth in Buddhist Philosophy. (Oxford: Oxford University Press, 2010, ISBN 0199751439)
- Nagarjuna's Madhyamaka. (Oxford: Oxford University Press, 2009)
- Ontological Categories: Their Nature and Significance (Oxford: Oxford University Press, 2005)

=== Journal papers (selection) ===
- Westerhoff, Jan (2008). "Nāgārjuna's Arguments on Motion Revisited". Journal of Indian Philosophy. 36 (4): 455–479. doi:10.1007/s10781-008-9048-6. S2CID 85551781.
- Westerhoff, Jan (2007). "The Madhyamaka Concept of Svabhāva: Ontological and Cognitive Aspects". Asian Philosophy. 17: 17–45. doi:10.1080/09552360701201122. S2CID 143804698.
- Westerhoff, J. (2006). "Nāgārjuna's Catuṣkoṭi". Journal of Indian Philosophy. 34 (4): 367–395. doi:10.1007/s10781-005-6172-4. S2CID 169456015.
- Westerhoff, Jan (2005). "Logical Relations between Pictures". Journal of Philosophy. 102 (12): 603–623. doi:10.5840/jphil20051021210. S2CID 119028160.
- Westerhoff, Jan (2004). "The Construction of Ontological Categories". Australasian Journal of Philosophy. 82 (4): 595–620. doi:10.1080/713659902. S2CID 170787660.
- Westerhoff, Jan (2003). Erkenntnis. 58 (3): 379–414. doi:10.1023/A:1022670409809. S2CID 118231467.
- Westerhoff, Jan (2003). "Ludwig Benedict Tredes Forgotten Necessary Grammar". Kant-Studien. 94 (3). doi:10.1515/kant.2003.019.
- Westerhoff, Jan (2002). "Defining 'Ontological Category'". Proceedings of the Aristotelian Society. 102 (3): 287–293. doi:10.1111/1467-9264.00122.
- Westerhoff, Jan C. (2001). "A World of Signs: Baroque Pansemioticism, the Polyhistor and the Early Modern Wunderkammer". Journal of the History of Ideas. 62 (4): 633–650. doi:10.1353/jhi.2001.0041. S2CID 170210097.
- Westerhoff, Jan C. (1999). "Poeta Calculans: Harsdorffer, Leibniz, and the mathesis universalis". Journal of the History of Ideas. 60 (3): 449–467. doi:10.1353/jhi.1999.0031. S2CID 170774562.

=== Talks ===
- Talk on naturalizing Buddhism, 2011
- Talk at the Madhyamaka and Methodology Symposium, 2010

== See also ==
- Similarities between Pyrrhonism and Buddhism
