= Telangana State Tourism Development Corporation =

State-owned body in Telangana, India

Telangana Tourism Development Corporation

Public Sector Undertaking overview
- Formed: 2 June 2014 (12 years ago)
- Type: Tourism, Ecotourism, Hotel Management
- Jurisdiction: Telangana, India
- Headquarters: Hyderabad, Telangana, India
- Motto: Telangana Zarur Aana
- Public Sector Undertaking executive: Mr. Patel Ramesh Reddy, Chairman
- Parent department: Tourism Government of Telangana
- Website: tourism.telangana.gov.in

The Telangana Tourism Development Corporation (TGTDC) is a state government agency which promotes tourism in Telangana, India.

Telangana State Tourism Corporation Ltd Hyderabad

Telangana State Tourism Corporation Ltd Hyderabad

Telangana State Tourism Corporation Ltd Hyderabad

== Aims ==
The aim of TGTDC is to provide infrastructure, conveyance and other facilities to tourists visiting Telangana. Part of its mission is also to promote unknown tourist spots in Telangana.

TGTDC owns a considerable transport fleet of 63 vehicles, which includes high-end Volvo and Mercedes Benz coaches, and other air-conditioned and non-air-conditioned coaches. The fleet will be deployed for conducting regular and on demand packages.

TGTDC have a chain of Haritha Hotels which are spread across the state of Telangana at all major tourist destinations with a size of 33 hotels which includes wayside amenities on major national highways.

Gellu Srinivas Yadav was appointed by the former Chief Minister of Telangana, K. Chandrashekar Rao, as the new chairman of the Telangana Tourism Development Corporation for a period of two years on 4 April 2023.

== Special attractions ==
While focusing on the forefront of adventure and eco-tourism projects, TGTDC is organizing adventure clubs at Bhongir Fort for rock climbing activities and trekking, adventure jeep ride into the forest at Kawal Wildlife Sanctuary, Jannaram in Adilabad District.

TGTDC owns the largest water fleet - about 95, which includes small and big boats — when compared with any other tourism corporation. The corporation operates leisure based cruises and water sports at different lakes and rivers of the state, parasailing activity at Hussain Sagar, etc., are very popular for leisure cruises apart from American pontoon boats.

TGTDC presents sound and light shows at Golconda Fort, Shilparamam and the Taramati Baradari. These shows have recorded narrations (English, Hindi and Telugu) along with imaginative use of music, sound and light effects.

== Awards ==
- National Tourism Award 2013-14 under the category Best Tourism friendly Golf Course.
