= Tiruppattur R. Venkatachala Murti =

Indian academic, philosopher, writer and translator

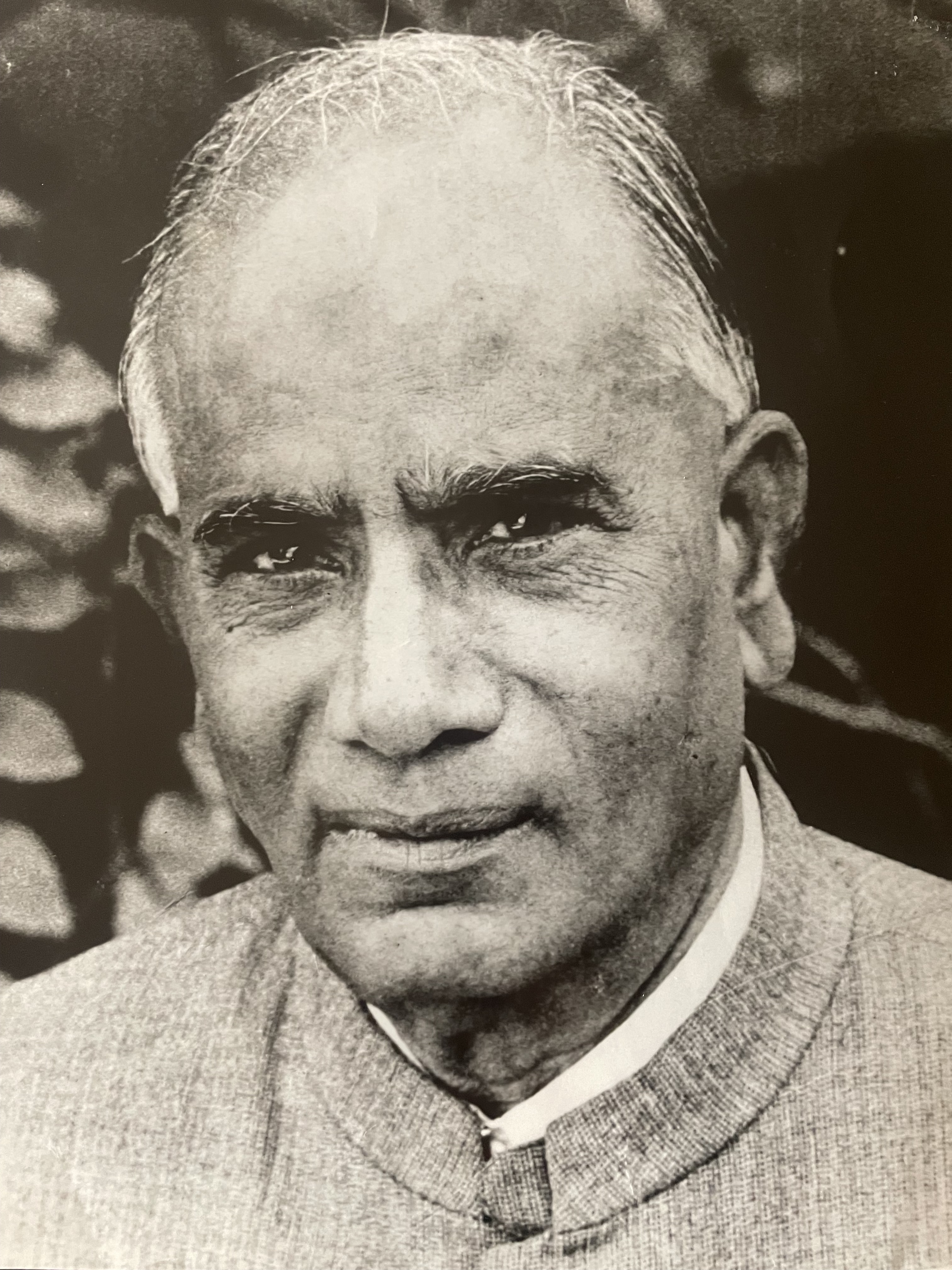
- Born: June 15, 1902; India
- Died: March 1986 (aged 83)
- Occupations: Philosopher; Writer; Academic
- Employer: Banaras Hindu University
- Known for: Oriental philosophy
- Notable work: The Central Philosophy of Buddhism
- Awards: Padma Bhushan

Tirupattur Ramaseshayyer Venkatachala Murti (June 15, 1902 – March 1986) was an Indian academic, philosopher, writer and translator. He wrote several books on Oriental philosophy, particularly Indian philosophy and his works included commentaries and translations of Indian and Buddhist texts. He was an elected honorary member of the International Association of Buddhist Studies (IABS), a society promoting scholarship in Buddhist studies. Studies in Indian Thought: Collected Papers, The Central Philosophy of Buddhism and A Study of the Madhyamika System are some of his notable works. The Government of India awarded him the third highest civilian honour of the Padma Bhushan, in 1959, for his contributions to education and literature.

Murti dedicates his 1955 work, The Central Philosophy of Buddhism, as follows: "To my revered teacher Professor S. Radhakrishnan".

== Selected bibliography ==
- Tirupattur Ramaseshayyer Venkatachala Murti (1960). A Study of the Madhyamika System. George Allen and Unwin. p. 372. OCLC 852127344.
- Tirupattur Ramaseshayyer Venkatachala Murti (Author), Harold G. Coward (Editor) (1996). Studies in Indian Thought: Collected Papers. Motilal Banarsidass. p. 426. ISBN 9788120813106.
- Tirupattur Ramaseshayyer Venkatachala Murti (2003). Central Philosophy of Buddhism. Munshir Manoharlal Publishing. p. 372. ISBN 9788121510806.

== See also ==
- Poola Tirupati Raju
- M. Hiriyanna
