= Veenavanka =

Coordinates: 18°23′51″N 79°23′16″E

Veenavanka Enanka Venanka
- Village
- Nickname: Vvk
- Interactive map of Veenavanka
- Country: India
- State: Telangana
- District: Karimnagar
- Mandal: Veenavanka

Languages
  - Official: Telugu
- Time zone: UTC+5:30 (IST)
- PIN: 505502
- Vehicle registration: TS
- Website: telangana.gov.in

Veenavanka is a village in Veenavanka mandal of Karimnagar district in the state of Telangana in India.
