= 100 Pun de Meicho =

- 100分de名著
- Genre: Literature; Education
- Country of origin: Japan
- Original language: Japanese

Production
- Running time: 25 minutes
- Production company: NHK

Original release
- Release: 2011 – 2017

100 Pun de Meicho (100分de名著; Literally "An introduction to a masterpiece of literature within 100 minutes") is an NHK television program in Japan, broadcast since 2011.

== Concept ==
The personalities and the pundit discuss the masterpiece

The concept of the program is to shed light on a masterpiece of literature from all over the world, from classic to contemporary literature. The program invites an expert as the pundit who is best known for the selected masterpiece, in terms of both of the prominent knowledge of (and research on) the title and the excellence in presentation skills to the broad audiences comprehensibly. The pundit explains the profound world of the title concisely, but insightfully and enjoyable. 100 Pun (100 minutes) means the one title will be explained in 25 minutes per week, in a month (4 weeks × 25 minutes = 100 minutes). In the last week, the program will invite another guest commentator and have discussion sessions with the personalities and the pundit (not all the time).

== Broadcast ==
(2018-)
Monday 22:25 - 22:50
Wednesday 5:30 - 5:55、12:00 - 12:25

== Personalities ==
(2018-)
・Hikaru Ijūin
・Yuriko Shimazu

== Narrators ==
In the program, the renowned professional narrators read the major lines of the work.

[[]].

== Program ==
=== Regular series ===
Date	Book Title	Author name	Pundit
2018/1	Nanshuo Ikun (teachings of the deceased by an old man in Nanshu)	Saigō Takamori	Akinaka Senzaki
2018/2	The Hunchback of Notre-Dame	Victor Hugo	Shigeru Kashima
2018/3	1) Points and Lines; 2) Inspector Imanishi Investigates; 3) Unearthing the Shōwa Period; 4) Madness of gods	Seichō Matsumoto	Takeshi Hara
2018/4	The Lotus Sutra		Masatoshi Ueki
2018/5	On the Meaning of Life	Mieko Kamiya	Eisuke Wakamatsu

100 Pun de Meicho: regular series (2011 - 2017)
Date	Book Title	Author name	Pundit
2011/4	Thus Spoke Zarathustra	Friedrich Nietzsche	Ken Nishi
2011/5	Analects	Confucius	Yasushi Saku
2011/6	Management: Tasks, Responsibilities, Practices	Peter Drucker	Atsuo Ueda
2011/7	Gakumon no Susume	Fukuzawa Yukichi	Takashi Saito
2011/9	Dhammapada	Gautama Buddha	Shizuka Sasaki
2011/10	The Prince	Niccolò Machiavelli	Yoshimi Takeda
2011/11	On Happiness	Alain	Masato Goda
2011/12	Night on the Galactic Railroad	Kenji Miyazawa	Roger Pulvers
2012/1	Tsurezuregusa	Kenko Houshi	Fumiko Ogino
2012/2	Bushido	Nitobe Inazō	Hirohumi Yaamoto
2012/4	The Tale of Genji	Murasaki Shikibu	Masako Mitamura
2012/5	The Metamorphosis	Franz Kafka	Takashi Kawashima
2012/6	Pensées	Blaise Pascal	Shigeru Kashima
2012/8	Man's Search for Meaning	Viktor Frankl	Yoshihiko Morotomi
2012/9	The Seagull	Anton Chekhov	Mitsuyoshi Numano
2012/10	Hōjōki	Kamo no Chōmei	Kazuhiko Kobayashi
2012/11	Theory of relativity	Albert Einstein	Katsuhiko Sato
2012/12	The Little Prince	Antoine de Saint-Exupéry	Hirofumi Mizumoto
2013/1	Heart Sutra		Sizuka Sasaki
2013/2	The Count of Monte Cristo	Alexandre Dumas	Ken-ichi Sato
2013/4	Kokoro	Natsume Sōseki	Kang Sang-jung
2013/5		Laozi	Kunio Hachiya
2013/6	War and Peace	Leo Tolstoy	Kaori Kawabata
2013/7	Symposium	Plato	Noburu Notomi
2013/9	Kojiki (Records of Ancient Matters)		Sukeyuki Miura
2013/10	Oku no Hosomichi	Matsuo Bashō	Kai Hasegawa
2013/11	One Thousand and One Nights		Tetsuo Nishio
2013/12	Crime and Punishment	Fyodor Dostoevsky	Kameyama Ikuo
2014/1	Fūshikaden	Zeami Motokiyo	Kei-ichiro Tsuchiya
2014/2	The Art of Loving	Erich Fromm	Sho Suzuki
2014/3	The Art of War		Kunihiko Yuasa
2014/4	Man'yōshū		Yukitsuna Sasaki
2014/5	Old Testament		Takashi Kato
2014/6	Tōno Monogatari	Kunio Yanagita	Masami Ishi
2014/7	Entomological Souvenirs	Jean-Henri Fabre|	Daisaburo Okumoto
2014/8	The Diary of a Young Girl	Anne Frank	Yōko Ogawa
2014/10	The Pillow Book	Sei Shōnagon	Nakami Yamaguchi
2014/11	Caigentan	Hong Zicheng	Kunihiro Yuasa
2014/12	Hamlet	William Shakespeare	Shouichiro Kawao
2015/1	The Book of Tea	Okakura Tenshin	Takaki Ookubo
2015/2	Frankenstein	Mary Shelley	Yumiko Hirono
2015/4	Mahāyāna Mahāparinirvāṇa Sūtra	Gautama Buddha	Ren Osugi
2015/5	Zhuangzi		Souyu Genyu
2015/6	Oedipus Rex	Sophocles	Masahiko Shimada
2015/7	Glimpses of Unfamiliar Japan	Koizumi Yakumo	Masayuki Ikeda
2015/8	On the Origin of Species	Charles Darwin	Mariko Hasegawa
2015/9	The Setting Sun	Osamu Dazai	Genichiro Takahashi
2015/11	Existentialism and Humanism	Jean-Paul Sartre	Takeshi Ebisaka
2015/12	(Ryōkan: poems, letters, and other writings)	Ryōkan	Tozen Nakano
2016/1	Representative men of Japan: essays	Uchimura Kanzō	Eisuke Wakatatsu
2016/2	What Life Should Mean to You	Alfred Adler	Ichiro Kishimi
2016/3	1) Kunitori monogatari 2) Kashin; 3) "Meiji To Iu Kokka"; 4) Konokuni no Katachi	Ryōtarō Shiba	Michifumi Isoda
2016/4	Tannishō (Lamentations of Divergences)	Yuien	Tesshu Shaku
2016/5	The Book of Five Rings	Miyamoto Musashi	Takashi Uozumi
2016/6	Emile, or On Education	Jean-Jacques Rousseau	Ken Nishi
2016/7	Discourse on Decadence	Ango Sakaguchi	Takaki Okubo
2016/8	Perpetual Peace: A Philosophical Sketch	Immanuel Kant	Toshihito Kayano
2016/9	Paradise in the Sea of Sorrow: Our Minamata Disease	Michiko Ishimure	Eisuke Wakamatsu
2016/11	Shōbōgenzō	Dōgen	Hiro Sachiya
2016/12	The Savage Mind	Claude Lévi-Strauss	Shin-ichi Nakazawa
2017/1	(Chūya Nakahara:poems)	Chūya Nakahara	Haruko Ota
2017/2	Letter from Jail	Mahatma Gandhi	Takeshi Nakajima
2017/3	(Feature:Kenji Miyazawa)	Kenji Miyazawa	Kiyomi Yamashita
2017/4	Jinseiron Note	Kiyoshi Miki	Ichiro Kishiim
2017/5	Records of the Three Kingdoms	Chen Shou	Yoshihiro Watanabe
2017/6	Vimalakirti Sutra		Tessyu Shaku
2017/7	Pride and Prejudice	Jane Austen	Yumiko Hirono
2017/8	Fires on the Plain	Shōhei Ōoka	Masahiko Shimada
2017/9	The Origins of Totalitarianism	Hannah Arendt	Masaki Nakamasa
2017/11	The Conquest of Happiness	Bertrand Russell	Hitoshi Ogawa
2017/12	Solaris	Stanisław Lem	Mitsuyoshi Numano

=== Special series ===
100 Pun de Meicho: special series
Date	Theme	Book Title	Author name	Pundit
2014/1/2	100 Pun de Kouhuku Ron (Happiness)	1) ・The Life of an Amorous Man ・The Life of an Amorous Woman; 2) The Wealth of Nations; 3) The Phenomenology of Spirit; 4) Introduction to Psychoanalysis	1) Ihara Saikaku; 2) Adam Smith; 3) Georg Wilhelm Friedrich Hegel; 4) Sigmund Freud	1) Masahiko Shimada; 2) Noriko Hama; 3) Ken Nishi; 4) Sho Suzuki
2015/1/2	100 Pun de Nihonjin Ron (Japanese people)	1) The Structure of "Iki"; 2) The Book of the Dead; 3) The Center-Empty Structure: the Deep Structure of Japan; 4) Japanese Spirituality	1) Shūzō Kuki; 2) Shinobu Orikuchi; 3) Hayao Kawai; 4) Daisetsu Suzuki	1) Seigo Matsuoka; 2) Mari Akasaka; 3) Tamaki Saitō; 4) Shin-ichi Nakazawa
2016/1/2	100 Pun de Heiwa Ron (Peace)	1) Civilization and Its Discontents; 2) The Mediterranean; 3) The Eternal Storehouse of Japan; 4) (Kanyo ron)	1) Sigmund Freud; 2) Fernand Braudel; 3)Ihara Saikaku; 4) Voltaire	1) Tamaki Saitō; 2) Shinobu Orikuchi; 3) Hayao Kawai; 4) Daisetsu Suzuki
2016/11/12	100 Pun de "Osamu Tezuka"	1) ・Princess Knight ・MU; 2) Astro Boy; 3) Ayako; 4) Phoenix:Hō-ō	Osamu Tezuka	1) Bourbonne; 2) Sion Sono; 3)Tamaki Saitō; 4) Tessyu Shaku

=== Single ===
This was broadcast as "100 Pun de Shihonron" in NHK Bangumi Tamago.

Date	Book Title	Author name	Pundit
2010/9	Capital: Critique of Political Economy	Karl Marx	Akihito Matoba

== Awards ==
- Galaxy Award, January, 2016
- Hoso Bunka Foundation Awards, January, 2016
