= Sachiya =

== Places ==
- Sachiya Mata Temple a Hindu building

== People ==
- Hiro Sachiya (ひろさちや; 1936–2022), Japanese religious scholar
- Sachiya Yamasaki (山崎 福也; born 1992), Japanese professional baseball pitcher
