= Upasaka Wen Shu =

Richard Hunn
- Richard Hunn (1949–2006)

Religious life
- Religion: Chan Buddhism
- Lineage: Caodong
- Dharma name: Upāsaka Wen Shu

Senior posting
- Teacher: Charles Luk
- Students: Adrian Chan-Wyles

Richard Hunn (1949–2006) had the lay-Buddhist name of Upasaka Wen Shu. He was the disciple of Charles Luk (1898–1978) and practiced Chan Buddhism, as taught to Charles Luk by the Chinese Buddhist master Hsu Yun (虛雲, 1840–1959).

== Buddhist translations ==
This is often translated as Dhyana (Chin. Chan-na) in other contexts, but in the “Transmission of the Mind” or Ch’an School proper, it has a wider meaning. Though Ch’an adherents do indeed cultivate dhyana and prajna, or stillness and wisdom, the Ch’an School understands this is in a dynamic and not static way. Bodhidharma’s mission was to ‘point directly to the Mind’ for outright cognisance of the Dharmakaya or Buddha-body without passing through the gradual stages mentioned in the teaching school.’

Richard Hunn edited the English translation of the Chinese text of the autobiography of Hsu Yun in 1987, which was subsequently published through Element Books in 1988. He expanded on the original translation by Charles Luk, comparing the English text to the Chinese original (pinyin: Xū Yún Héshàng Niánpǔ), editing and making revisions where required. He also added extra notes, a glossary and the use of modern pinyin. Several passages were rewritten or added, constituting new translations.

Richard Hunn had this to say about the project:

Now, with the Element edition, I would like to remember my Kalyanamitra and kind friend, Charles Luk, who worked so hard to present many fine translations of the Chinese Buddhist texts, besides which I must thank Irene Luk, his daughter, for continuing to take an interest in her father’s work and allowing this text to become available again, albeit in modified form.

== Teaching activity ==
In 1990, Richard Hunn relocated to Lancashire to further his academic studies within the field of Chinese Buddhism. Prior to this however, he spent many years living in Thorpe Hamlet, where he served as an authority on Chan Buddhism. His knowledge and expertise were focused through the Norwich Ch’an Association – a loose affiliation of like minded people dedicated to spiritual practice. People would visit from the UK or from abroad seeking Chan instruction and every so often, Richard Hunn would hold "Ch’an Weeks", intensive meditational retreats that could last from between two days to two weeks. This is an ancient tradition dating back to Song China (960–1279) that recognises the importance of the laity and lay practice within Chan Buddhism and follows the "enlightened lay-person" example of Vimalakirti.

Another crucial and important part of Richard Hunn's Chan teaching method evolved around the tradition of instruction by letter-writing. This involves the ability to use words in such away so as to affect change in the mind of the reader. It is a tradition exemplified by the Song master Dahui Zonggao (1089–1163) who, whilst living in remote hills, nevertheless kept up a wide Chan dialogue through the Song postal service.

During this time period, Richard Hunn also wrote reviews for the Middle Way, the journal of the Buddhist Society of the UK. He concentrated on newly published works of the Buddhist genre, but also commented on books within his own particular areas of expertise: Chinese philosophy, Buddhism, Daoism and Confucianism. His particular specialism was the Yijing and its various derivatives and works of influence. Richard Hunn spent much of the later years of his life working upon his own translation of the Yijing. The work was unpublished due to his death from cancer, but a sampler of the book went down well at the Frankfurt book-fair.

The Yijing was being translated while he was researching another book entitled Zen In China: The Roots of Tradition (Element Books). This research eventually led to Richard Hunn relocating to Kyoto, Japan in 1991 to further his studies. He spent the remaining fifteen years of his life happily in Japan where he remarried. He continued his research whilst teaching English to Japanese students, bringing groups of his students to the UK as part of an exchange programme. Richard Hunn and his wife would practice Kyudo (弓道-Japanese archery), and continued to do so up until he was diagnosed with cancer in 2005. Richard Hunn died on 1 October 2006 at the age of 57 years.

Richard Hunn dedicated his life to the preservation of the English translations of Chinese Buddhist texts created by his teacher, Charles Luk, for whom he wrote an obituary in 1980. Charles Luk was given the task of translating key Buddhist texts into English by Xu Yun. Today, this essential work is continued through the website Richard Hunn Association for Ch’an Study. Founded by Richard Hunn in 2004 during one of his visits to the UK, it continues to grow through the guidance of Richard Hunn's Chan students in the UK. The current custodian of the website trained with Richard Hunn over a seventeen-year period and has an archive of written material to draw from, written by Richard Hunn over that time period.

From all the Chinese Ch’an records, it is easy to determine that at least 80% of the “awakening experiences” in fact took place during apparently mundane activities…working in the fields, cooking rice, hearing one’s name called, a slap, a kick! And there is reason for this. Continued introspection or “turning back” of the mind arouses an “inner potentiality” (nei chih), which eventually breaks through into “ordinary” consciousness. One then sees that seemingly conditioned events…one’s own self…all surroundings…arise in this marvellous emptiness…’

To this end Richard Hunn advocated a broad appeal coupled with the exactness of study. He always dedicated his work to Master Xu Yun and Charles Luk. In recent years, work inspired by Richard Hunn has continued with the translation of Chinese texts relating to Chan masters who have lived into the modern age. These translations have been placed on the Richard Hunn Association for Ch'an Study free for all to read. This on-going translation project has been extensively assisted by Upasika Sheng Hua and Upasika Yukyern, and now includes vital technical and interpretive input from Chinese sources.

The obituary for Richard Hunn was written by his British disciple Adrian Chan-Wyles and appears in the Buddhist Society's Journal The Middle Way. Adrian Chan-Wyles is the custodian of the Richard Hunn Association for Ch'an Study, and continues this lineage.
