= Étienne Lamotte =

Belgian priest and academic (1903–1983)

Étienne Paul Marie Lamotte (French pronunciation: [etjɛn pɔl maʁi lamɔt]; 21 November 1903 – 5 May 1983) was a Belgian priest and Professor of Greek at the Catholic University of Louvain, but was better known as an Indologist and the greatest authority on Buddhism in the West in his time. He studied under his pioneering compatriot Louis de La Vallée-Poussin and was one of the few scholars familiar with all the main Buddhist languages: Pali, Sanskrit, Chinese and Tibetan. His first published work was his PhD thesis: Notes sur le Bhagavad-Gita (Paris, Geuthner, 1929). - In 1953, he was awarded the Francqui Prize in Human Science.

== The Translation of Da zhi du lun ==
He is also known for his French translation of the Mahāprajñāpāramitāupadeśa (Chinese: 大智度論, English: Treatise on the Great Perfection of Wisdom), a text attributed to Nāgārjuna. Lamotte thought that the text was most likely composed by an Indian bhikkhu from the Sarvastivada tradition, who later became a convert to Mahayana Buddhism. Lamotte's translation was published in five volumes but unfortunately remains incomplete, since his death put an end to his efforts.

== Other works ==
In addition to the Mahāprajñāpāramitāupadeśa, Lamotte also composed several other important translations from Mahayana sutras, including the Suramgamasamadhi sutra, and the Vimalakirti sutra.

== Publications ==
Paul Williams, author of a book review of one of Lamotte's books for the Journal of the Royal Asiatic Society, wrote that his "works are always more than just translations or interpretations. They are vast encyclopedias of references and primary source materials from half a dozen languages which he seems to handle with complete familiarity."

- Le traité de la grande vertu de sagesse de Nāgārjuna (Mahāprajñāpāramitāśāstra) vol. 1 (1944)
- Le traité de la grande vertu de sagesse de Nāgārjuna (Mahāprajñāpāramitāśāstra) vol. 2 (1949)
- Histoire du bouddhisme indien (1958) trans. into English as The History of Indian Buddhism 1988.
- The Spirit of Ancient Buddhism (1961)
- The Teaching of Vimalakirti (Vimalakīrtinirdeśa) (1962) (Pali Text Soc. trans. 1986)
- Śūraṃgamasamādhisūtra, The Concentration of Heroic Progress: An Early Mahayana Buddhist Scripture (1965) (Eng. trans: Curzon Press 1998)
- Le traité de la grande vertu de sagesse de Nāgārjuna (Mahāprajñāpāramitāśāstra) vol. 3 (1970)
- Le traité de la grande vertu de sagesse de Nāgārjuna (Mahāprajñāpāramitāśāstra) vol. 4 (1976)
- Le traité de la grande vertu de sagesse de Nāgārjuna (Mahāprajñāpāramitāśāstra) vol. 5 (1980)
- Karmasiddhi Prakarana, English trans. Leo M. Pruden 1988.

== See also ==
- Buddhism in Belgium
