= Śūraṅgama Samādhi Sūtra =

Sutra in Mahāyāna Buddhism

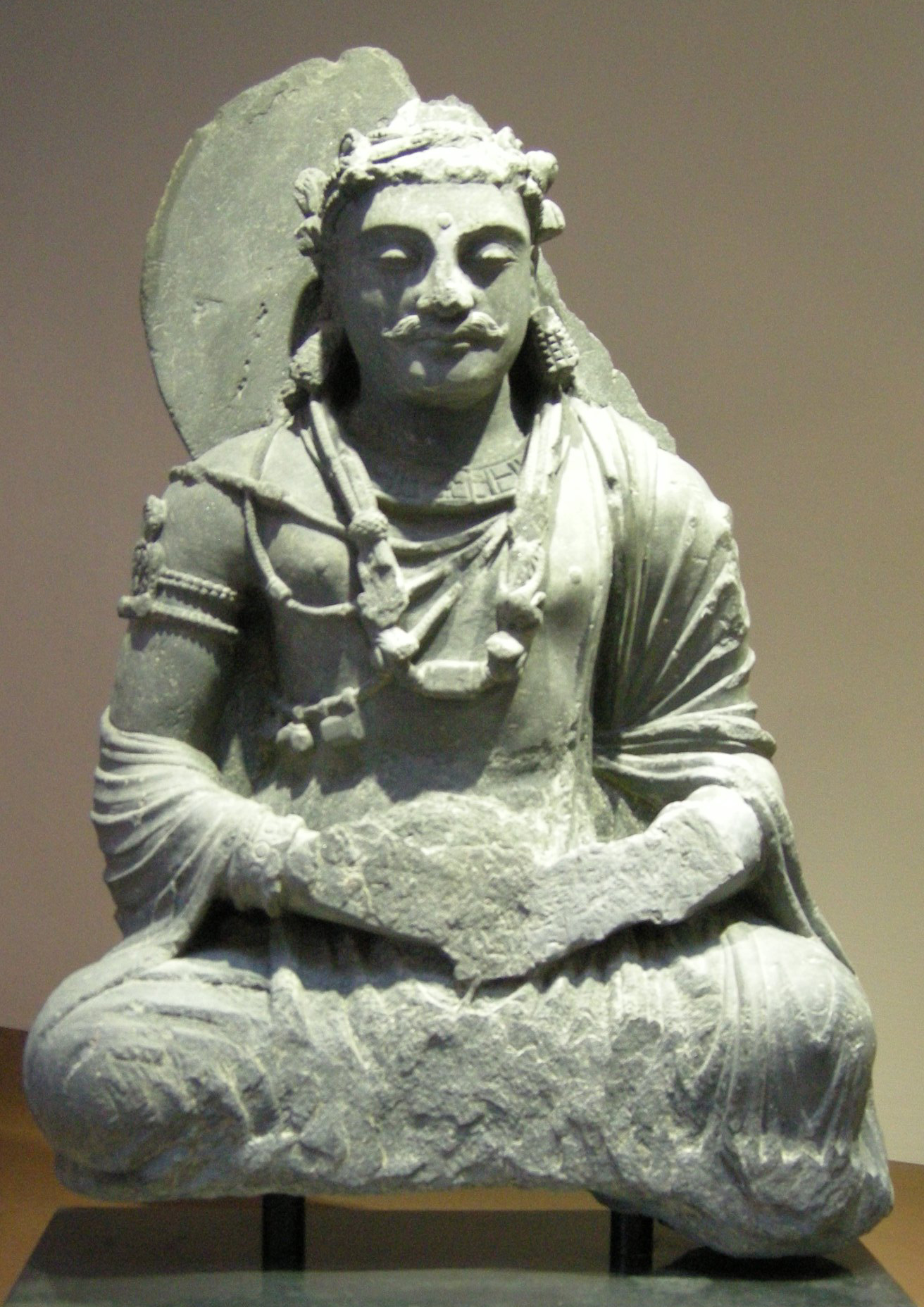
Bodhisattva seated in meditation. Afghanistan, 2nd century CE

The Śūraṅgama Samādhi Sūtra (Sanskrit; traditional Chinese: 首楞嚴三昧經; simplified Chinese: 首楞严三昧经; pinyin: Shǒuléngyán Sānmèi Jīng; Wade–Giles: Shou-leng-yen San-mei Ching; Vietnamese: Kinh Thủ Lang Nghiêm Tam Muội) is an early Mahayana sutra of Indian origin which focuses on the transcendental nature, supernatural powers, and transformational feats bestowed upon the meditation practitioner by the state of meditation called the "Śūraṅgama Samādhi" or the "Samādhi of the Heroic Progression."

== History ==
The Śūraṅgama Samādhi Sūtra was translated from the Sanskrit into Chinese by Kumārajīva probably between 402 and 409 C.E. Sengyou's sutra catalogue entitled Chu sanzang ji ji (出三藏記集), which was produced in 515 CE, credits Lokakṣema with first translating this text considerably earlier in the 2nd century C.E.; however, it was already considered lost at the time of Sengyou's work. It was later translated into Tibetan by Sakyaprabha and Ratnaraksita at the beginning of the 9th century.

== Contents ==
=== The nature of the Buddha ===
Professor Lamotte describes the nature of the Buddha in this sutra as follows:

This is Sakyamuni in Heroic Progress, a pure ray of wisdom and power, who manifests himself simultaneously in our little universe of four continents, in the Great Cosmos ... and in all the great cosmic systems ...; there, he is some divinity .... He is the same as the Buddha Vairocana.

=== Powers of the Buddha ===
The sutra describes the 100 powers and abilities which the Buddha or 10th-level Bodhisattvas can perform, while operating from within this samādhi state.

Amongst the wonders which the Buddha can perform whilst in this state of Śūraṅgama Samādhi are:

- The projection or conjuration of 84,000 other Buddhas, identical replicas of himself and equally real
- Complete purification of individual mind and ability to purify the mind of others
- Universal omniscience
- True knowledge regarding the mechanism of cause and effect without mental obstruction
- Knowledge regarding the dissipation of mental defilement, such as anger and lust
- Elimination of unnecessary mental activity and complete elimination of defilements
- Harmonious renunciation of worldly life
- Being able to access and understand different existential forms
- Being able to change sex at will without mental confusion
- Always knowing the right moral path to proceed
- Placing immense Buddha Paradises (universes) into a single pore of the skin
- Always presiding over the superknowledges (abhijna)
- Always emitting rays of light over all universes without exception
- Being able to speak and understand all languages of all universes
- Completely avoiding all evil paths
- Possessing a knowledge which is profound and unfathomable

=== Knowledge of the Dharmadhatu ===
Part of that profound and unfathomable knowledge is that all dharmas (things) have their basis in the dharma-dhatu - the element of phenomena. In this sense, there is non-duality that characterises everything, since everything is possessed of the 'one flavour' of the dharma-dhatu. The Buddha states:

A bodhisattva knows that all dharmas rest eternally on the fundamental element (dharmadhatu) without coming or going.

=== Attributes of a Buddha ===
The Buddha remarks in the Śūraṅgama Samādhi Sūtra that any being who cultivates this samadhi will be able to know through pratyatmajnanam, "through personal experience," through knowing directly within oneself, all the attributes of a buddha.

Amongst those attributes is sovereignty over all humans and gods. The Buddha states of great bodhisattvas and buddhas who possess this samadhi:

They possess sovereignty over all the gods and mankind, but do not fall into pride.

A bodhisattva who is immersed in this samadhi also rises beyond birth and death. The Buddha comments:

He appears to die, but he is beyond birth, death and passing on.

=== Blessings ===
Even the writing down, studying and teaching of this Śūraṅgama Samādhi by a master of Dharma will bestow immense blessings, twenty in number. These include:

- Inconceivable knowledge and wisdom,
- Inconceivable vision of all the buddhas, and
- Inconceivable virtues and sovereign powers.

One of these powers is demonstrated by the future Buddha, Maitreya, who transforms himself into innumerable different types of leading spiritual personages in countless world-systems at the same time.

Commenting on the great qualities of those such as Maitreya who preside over the Śūraṅgama Samādhi, a whole host of great Bodhisattvas declare in the presence of the Buddha:

Bhagavat [Blessed One], just as gold, even if it has gone through the forge, never loses its self-nature [svabhava - essential nature], so these great Satpurusas [True Beings], wherever they may go, manifest everywhere their natures of inconceivable qualities.

== Mahāyāna Mahāparinirvāṇa Sūtra ==
This particular samadhi is equally praised in the Mahāyāna Mahāparinirvāṇa Sūtra, where the Buddha explains that this samadhi is the essence of the nature of the Buddha, and is indeed the "mother of all Buddhas."

The Buddha also comments that the Śūraṅgama Samādhi additionally goes under several other names, specifically:

- Prajñāpāramitā (Perfection of Wisdom)
- Vajra Samadhi (Diamond Samadhi)
- Simhanada Samadhi (Lion's Roar samadhi)
- Buddhasvabhava (Buddha essence).

== Sources ==
- Lamotte, E. (1998), Śūraṃgamasamādhisūtra, The Concentration of Heroic Progress: An Early Mahayana Buddhist Scripture, translated by Sara Boin-Webb, London: Curzon Press
- Harrison, Paul; McRae, John, trans. (1998). The Pratyutpanna Samādhi Sutra and the Śūraṅgama Samādhi Sutra, Berkeley, Calif.: Numata Center for Buddhist Translation and Research. ISBN 1-886439-06-0
