= Vimalakirti Sutra =

Sutra in Mahāyāna Buddhism

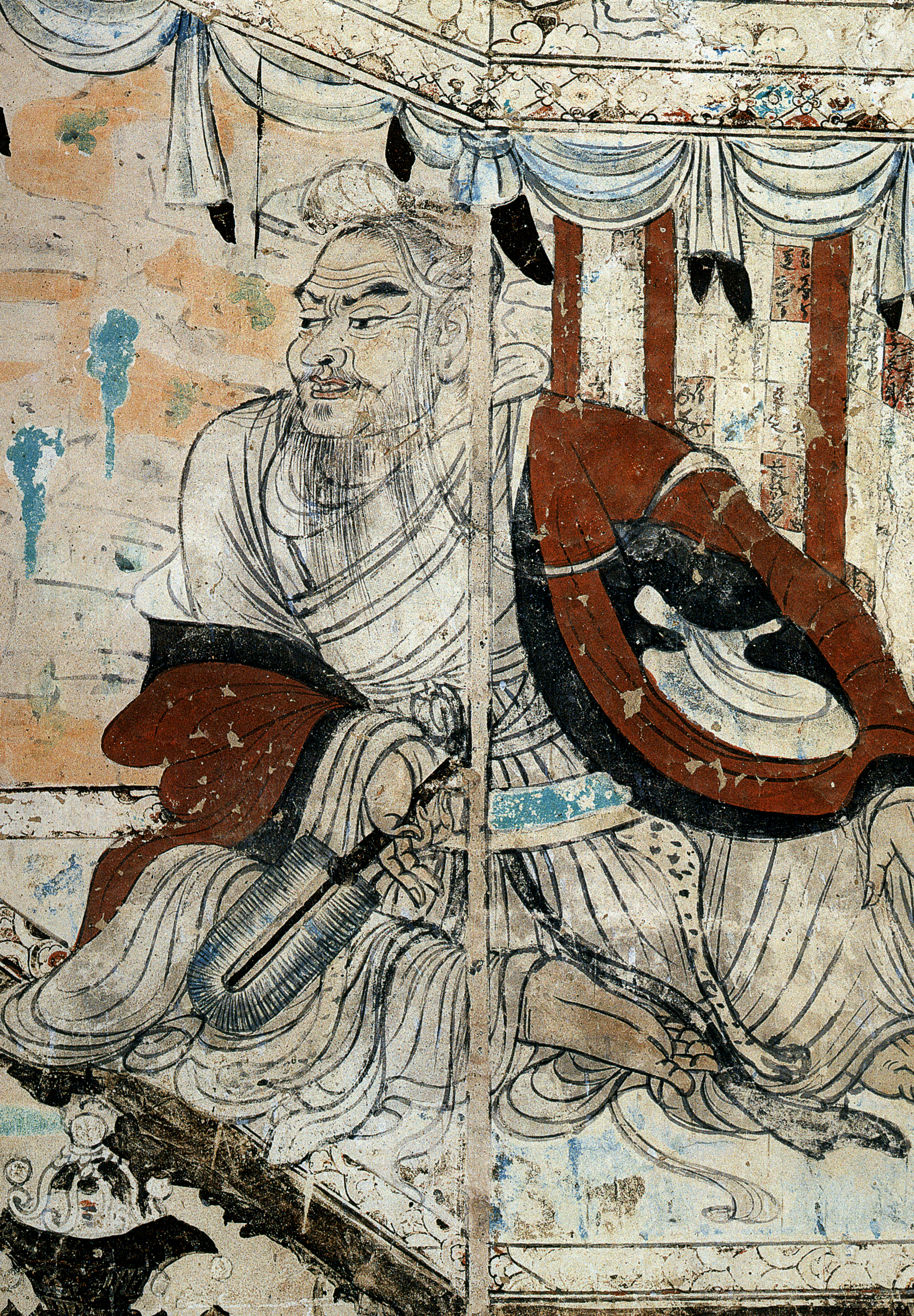
Vimalakīrti debating Bodhisattva Mañjuśrī. Chinese painting from the Dunhuang Caves, Tang dynasty

The Vimalakīrti Nirdeśa (Devanagari: विमलकीर्तिनिर्देश) (sometimes referred to as the Vimalakīrti Sūtra or Vimalakīrti Nirdeśa Sūtra) is a Mahayana Buddhist text which centers on a lay Buddhist meditator who attained a very high degree of enlightenment considered by some second only to the Buddha's. The word nirdeśa in the title means "instruction, advice", and Vimalakīrti is the name of the main protagonist of the text, and means "Taintless Fame".

The sutra teaches, among other subjects, the meaning of nondualism, the doctrine of the true body of the Buddha, the doctrine that the appearances of the world are mere illusions, and the superiority of the Mahāyāna over other paths. It places in the mouth of the upāsaka (lay practitioner) Vimalakīrti a teaching addressed to both arhats and bodhisattvas, regarding the doctrine of śūnyatā. In most versions, the discourse of the text culminates with a wordless teaching of silence. Translator Burton Watson argues that the Vimalakīrti Nirdeśa was likely composed in approximately 100 CE.

Although it had been thought lost for centuries, a version in Sanskrit was recovered in 1999 among the manuscripts of the Potala Palace in Lhasa. The Sanskrit was published in parallel with the Tibetan and three Chinese versions by the Study Group on Buddhist Sanskrit Literature at the Institute for Comprehensive Studies of Buddhism at Taisho University in 2004, and in 2006, the same group published a critical edition that has become the standard version of the Sanskrit for scholarly purposes. In 2007 the Nagarjuna Institute of Exact Methods published a romanized Sanskrit version under the title Āryavimalakīrtinirdeśo Nāma Mahāyānasūtram.

For a recent and thorough summary of the present scholarly understanding of the text, readers should consult Felbur.

== Translations ==
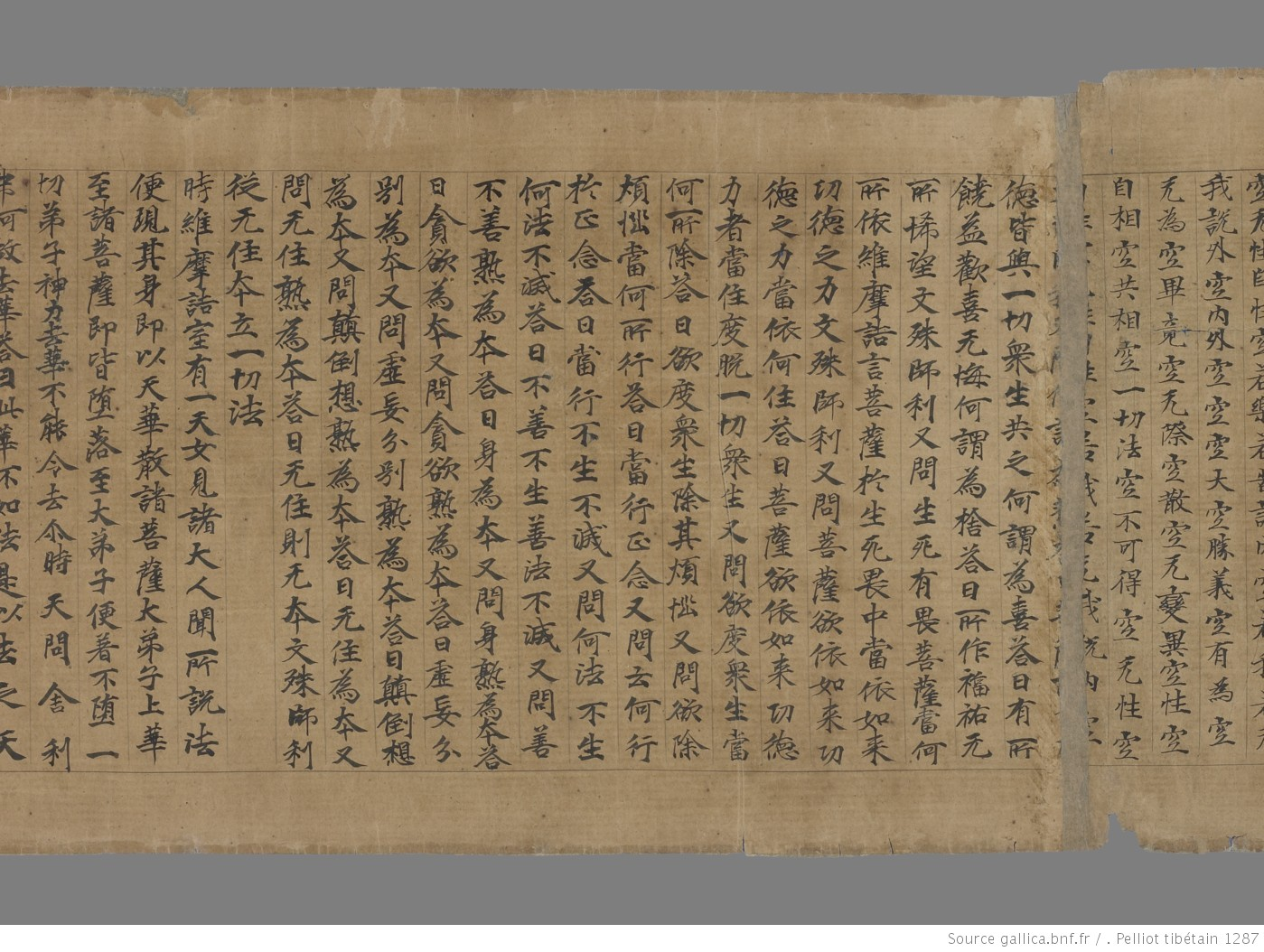
Fragments of Vimalakirti Sutra in Chinese on the reverse side of Old Tibetan Chronicle discovered in Dunhuang Mogao Cave #17

Various translations circulate, and an even greater number are known or claimed to have existed in the past.

Tradition holds that the text was translated into Classical Chinese seven times. A supposed first translation (probably legendary) is said in some classical bibliographic sources, beginning with the notoriously unreliable Lidai sanbao ji 歷代三寶紀 T2034 in 598 C.E., to have been produced by Yan Fotiao 嚴佛調. Three canonical Chinese versions are extant: an earlier version ascribed to Zhi Qian 支謙, entitled Weimojie jing 維摩詰經 T474; one produced by Kumārajīva 鳩摩羅什 in 406 C.E. under the title Weimojie suoshuo jing 維摩詰所說經 T475; and one translated by Xuanzang in 650 玄奘 and is entitled Shuo Wogoucheng jing 說無垢稱經 T476. Of these, the Kumārajīva version is the most famous.

The principal Tibetan version is that found in the Kanjur, by Chos nyid tshul khrims (Dharmatāśila), Dri ma med par grags pas bstan pa D176/Q843.' An additional version was found at Dunhuang in the early 20th century.

In modern English, six main translations exist, three from Kumārajīva's Chinese, two from the Tibetan, and one from the recently rediscovered Sanskrit text. A typically erudite French translation by Étienne Lamotte was made from the Tibetan. Lamotte's French was re-translated into English by Sara Boin-Webb, bringing the total number of English versions to five. The English translations are:

- Luk, Charles (1975). Ordinary Enlightenment: A Translation of the Vimalakirti Nirdesa. Shambhala Publications. ISBN 0394730658. (From Kumārajīva's Chinese)
- Lamotte, Etienne; Boin-Webb, Sara (1976). The Teaching of Vimalakirti: Vimalakirtinirdesa. Pali Text Society. ISBN 0860130770. (An exhaustive scholarly treatment) - Translation from French
- Watson, Burton (1997). The Vimalakirti Sutra. Columbia University Press. ISBN 0231106564. (From Kumārajīva's Chinese and featuring a short introduction)
- Thurman, Robert (1976). The Holy Teaching of Vimalakirti: A Mahayana Scripture. Pennsylvania State University Press. ISBN 0271012099. (From Tibetan and featuring short introduction, extensive notes and glossary entries). The same translation "with an abridged introduction and notes, and lightly edited under the supervision of Professor Thurman" is published online with open access at 84000: Translating the Words of the Buddha
- McRae, John (2004). The Sutra of Queen Śrīmālā of the Lion's Roar and the Vimalakīrti Sutra (PDF). Numata Center for Buddhist Translation and Research. ISBN 1886439311. Archived from the original (PDF) on 2018-03-26. (From Kumārajīva's Chinese and featuring short introduction, glossary, and minor notes)
- Cleary, Thomas (2013). Vimalakīrti's Advice. Amazon.com Services LLC. (The first English edition translated from the Potala Palace Sanskrit manuscript, with brief introduction. Seems available only as electronic book.)
- Gómez, Luis; Harrison, Paul (2022). Vimalakīrtinirdeśa The Teaching of Vimalakīrti. Mangalam Press. ISBN 978-1-7322209-1-1. (First scholarly translation from the Potala Palace Sanskrit manuscript, with an introduction and annotations.)
- Buddhist Translation Text Society (2022). The Vimalakirti Sutra. Buddhist Translation Text Society. ISBN 978-1642170757. (From Kumārajīva's Chinese and featuring a short introduction, annotations, index, and original Chinese version.)

Jan Nattier has discussed and compared most of these translations in considerable detail, as an interesting case in the agendas and resulting shortcomings of various approaches to modern Buddhist Studies.

There also exist or existed various translations (some of them at second remove) into the Japanese, Korean, Khotanese, Mongolian, Sogdian and Manchurian languages.

Most Japanese versions are based on Kumārajīva, but two translations directly from the rediscovered Sanskrit text into vernacular Japanese have also now been published, one by Takahashi Hisao 高橋尚夫 and Nishino Midori 西野翠, and one by Ueki Masatoshi 植木雅俊.

== Synopsis ==
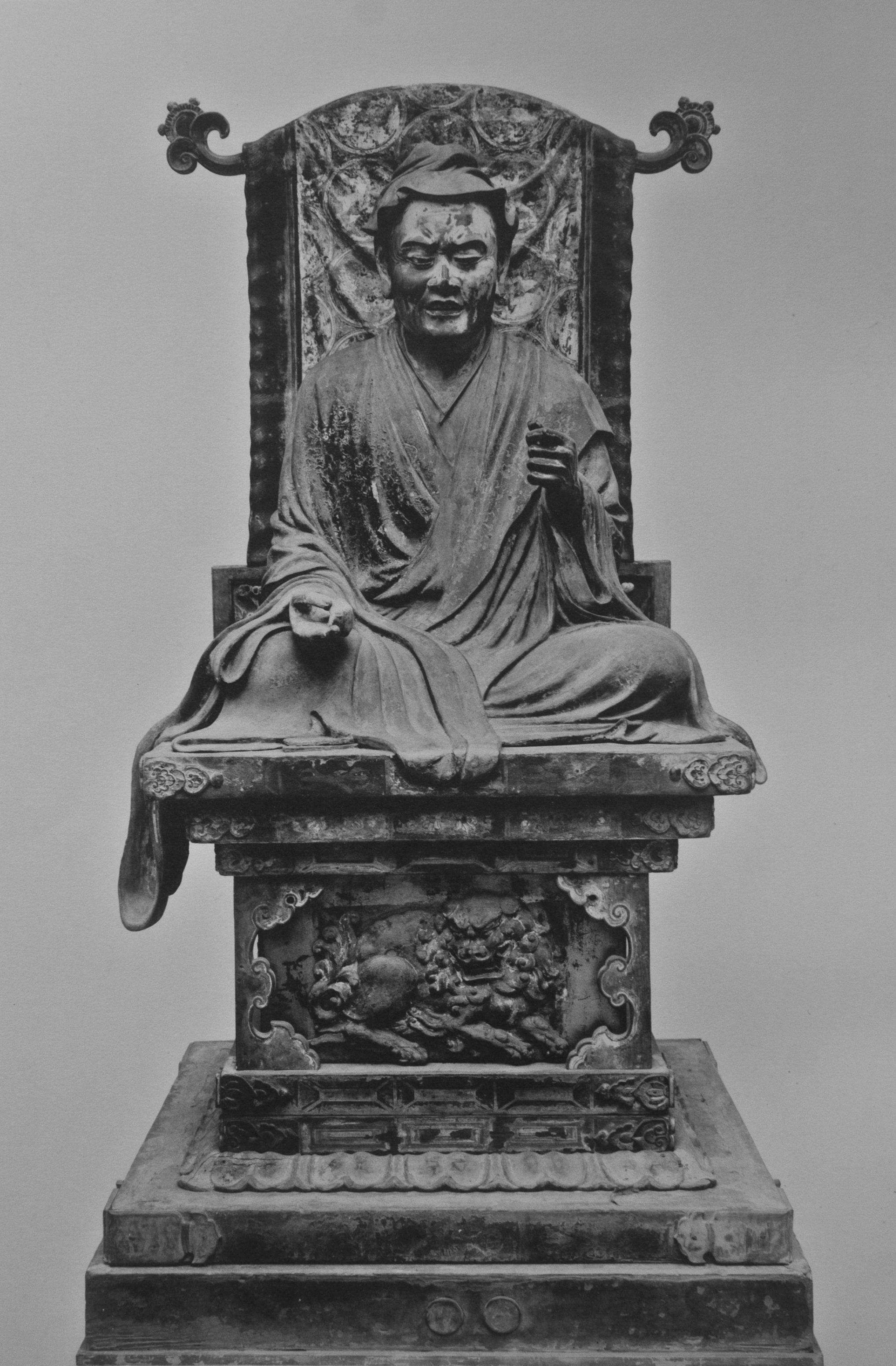
Layman Yuima (Vimalakirti), at the Hosso (Yogacara) temple of Kōfuku-ji

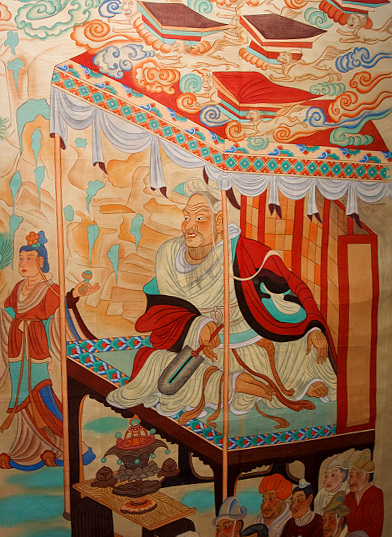
The layman Vimalakīrti Debates Manjusri, Dunhuang Mogao Caves

The Vimalakirti Sutra can be summarised as follows.

Chapter 1

The scene is Āmrapālī's garden outside Vaiśālī. Even in this setting, we may see evidence of the literary sophistication of the authors, and the foreshadowing of key themes (antinomianism, female characters as literary tropes): Āmrapālī was a famously accomplished courtesan, ascribed in narrative with various roles in relation to promulgation of the Dharma. Five hundred Licchavi youths offer parasols to the Buddha, who miraculously transforms them into a single gigantic parasol that covers the entire cosmos. The youths ask how the "Buddha field" (buddhakṣetra) can be purified. The Buddha responds that the Buddha field is pure when the mind is pure (this line was one source of a whole line of interpretation in Pure Land thinking in the later East Asian tradition). The buddhakṣetra is also equated with various other exalted categories in the Mahāyāna, such as the six perfections, or the four "illimitables" or "noble dwelling-places" (brahmavihāra). Because Śāriputra is unable to see this purity, the Buddha performs a miracle that displays it to him briefly. One implication of this scene is that our Sahā world—the buddhakṣetra of Śākyamuni—is in fact as glorious as other Buddha worlds, but our defilements prevent us from correctly seeing it as such.

Chapter 2

The scene is now Vimalakīrti's house in Vaiśālī. He is a wealthy merchant householder. He is a husband and a father. However, he is also a powerful bodhisattva with Buddha-like qualities. He enters dens of iniquity, such as gambling parlours, brothels, and the haunts of philosophers of other schools, but even in so doing, he is merely appearing to conform with the ways of this world in order to bring sentient beings to realisation of the truth. Note the echo of the famous courtesan Āmrapālī in the theme, emphasised here, of Vimalakīrti's ambivalent, even paradoxical, relationship to sexuality and chastity; the same theme is revisited in an amusing anecdote in Chapter 3, in which Vimalakīrti bests Māra (the "Buddhist devil") by accepting 12,000 goddesses from him for his "serving-women". These goddesses have just been rejected by another advanced practitioner as improper, but Vimalakīrti immediately takes the occasion to convert them towards ultimate awakening.

Here, it now transpires that Vimalakīrti is feigning illness, in order that he can exploit the sympathy visits of his fellow citizens to teach them. He teaches one such group of visitors about the distinction between the apparently impermanent material body, which is prone to such sickness, and the true body of the Buddha. This is one of the earliest developed instances of dharmakāya ("Dharma-body") doctrine known in Mahāyāna literature.

Chapter 3

The Buddha successively appeals to a string of his most advanced non-Mahāyāna disciples (mahāśrāvakas), and also to three bodhisattvas and a householder, to visit Vimalakīrti and ask after his health. They all refuse, saying that on prior occasions when they met with him, he showed them up in his understanding of various doctrines. Vimalakīrti is typically portrayed in these recounted exchanges as having triumphed by a kind of paradoxical and contrary rhetoric, which on the surface makes no sense. For example, he bested Śāriputra on the topic of sitting in meditation by asserting that true meditation is in fact a string of things bearing no obvious resemblance to meditation, such as having no body in the visible world, or abiding in a state of complete meditative cessation (normally held to resemble physical death to the untrained eye) while at the same time engaging actively and perfectly in all the niceties of monastic deportment.

Chapter 4

The bodhisattva Mañjuśrī (conventionally understood as the embodiment of supreme wisdom) is persuaded by the Buddha to visit Vimalakīrti, albeit with some difficulty. Vimalakīrti miraculously transforms his apparently narrow and humble abode into a vast cosmic palace, thus creating enough space for the throng Mañjuśrī has brought with him. Vimalakīrti explains his illness in spiritual terms, equating it with the fundamental existential malaise of all sentient beings. According to this discourse, the true cure for all ills is also spiritual, and involves the achievement of states of non-self and non-dualism.

Chapter 5

Vimalakīrti performs a further miracle, summoning from another distant Buddha-field 32,000 vast "lion thrones" (siṃhāsana) for Mañjuśrī and his company, without expanding his narrow room. Each of these seats is so immense that advanced bodhisattvas must transform their bodies to a size of 42,000 yojanas (leagues) tall to sit on them. Śariputra and other mahāśrāvakas, incapable of this feat, cannot mount their seats. This space- and mind-bending miracle is taken as the chance to teach that a vast array of "unthinkable" things are possible for advanced adherents of the Mahāyāna (e.g. inhaling all the winds of all the worlds at once, or showing all the offerings ever given to all Buddhas in a single pore of the skin of their bodies).

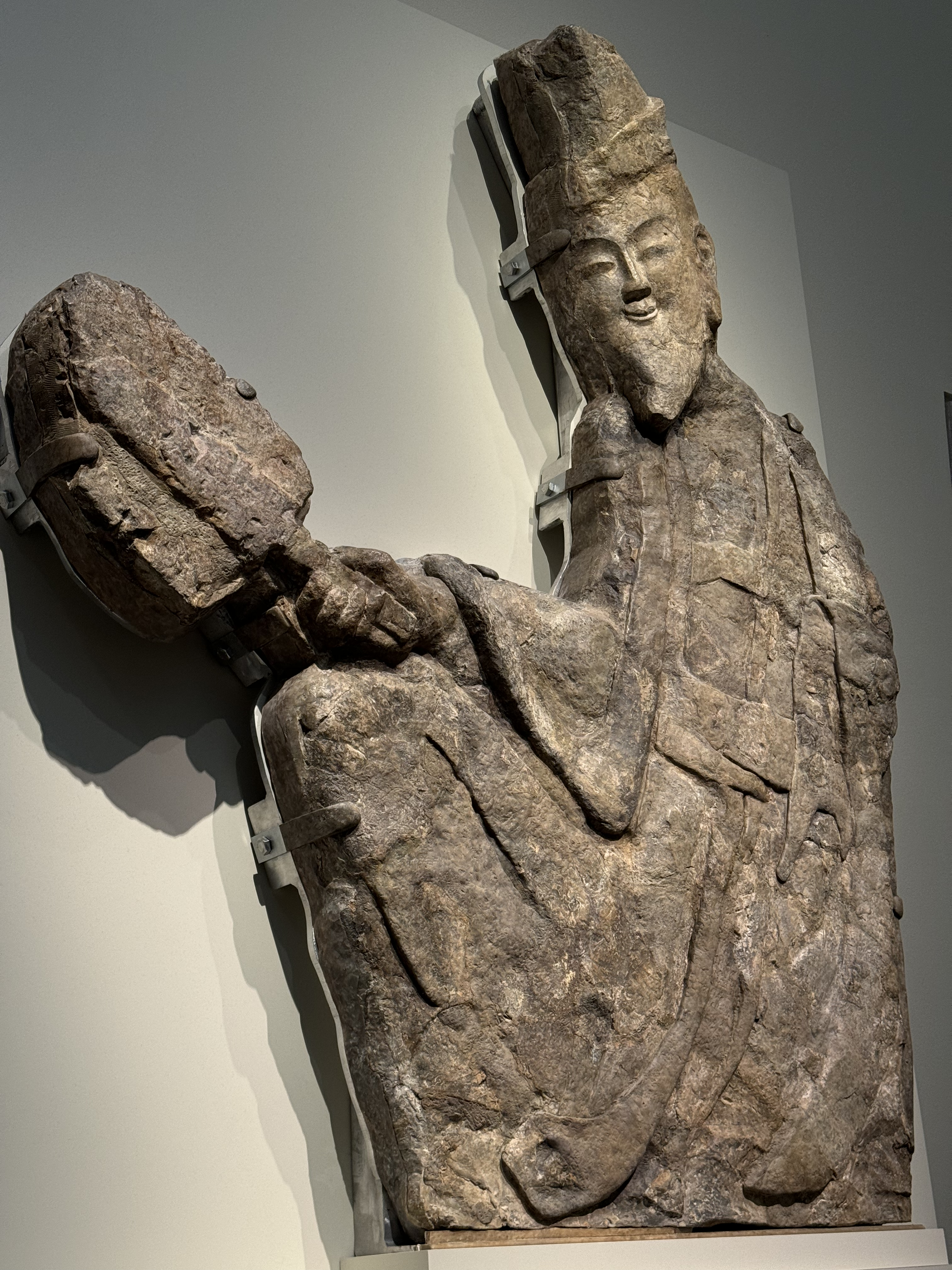
Relief of Vimalakirti from the Longmen Grottoes

Chapter 6

Vimalakīrti expounds a series of analogies designed to explain the point that the bodhisattva regards sentient beings as, in various senses, illusory or even logically impossible. A goddess then appears, who has been living in Vimalakīrti's room for twelve years. She creates a shower of heavenly petals. These petals stick to the bodies of the non-Mahāyāna adepts (mahāśrāvakas), but slide off the bodies of the bodhisattvas and drop to the ground. Śāriputra, perturbed (among other things, by a probable infringement of the monastic code, which prohibits personal adornment), even attempts to use his supernatural powers to shed this unwelcome decoration, but in vain. A battle of wits and wisdom ensues, in which Śāriputra is sorely bested and humiliated by the goddess. She explains that he cannot shake off the flowers because he is "attached" (for instance, to a formalistic and superficial understanding of the Dharma and the Vinaya). Śāriputra asks the goddess, perhaps somewhat peevishly, why she still has the (inferior) body of a woman, if she has attained to such high levels of insight. In response, she uses her own supernatural powers to switch bodies with Śāriputra, who is even more perturbed to find himself in the guise of a woman, but finds that nothing he does allows him to return to his own "true" form. Eventually, the goddess takes mercy and releases her hold, but the overall effect of the exchange is to show the vast superiority of Mahāyāna doctrine and practice over the other, more traditional forms of Buddhism of which Śāriputra is a paragon. The drama presented in this chapter has been an important reference point for traditional and especially modern attempts to find Mahāyāna perspectives on the nature of gender, and Buddhist feminist attempts to find canonical sources for a stance that ascribes equal spiritual status or potential to women.

Chapter 7

A dialogue ensues between Mañjuśrī and Vimalakīrti. Echoing the dramatic besting of Śāriputra—a famed expert in doctrine—by a mere non-Buddhist deity and female, this dialogue ultimately sees Mañjuśrī, the paragon of Mahāyāna wisdom, upstaged by someone who is apparently a "mere" householder, and (as we saw in Chapter 2), apparently no model of virtue at that—a companion of gamblers and prostitutes.

Chapter 8

Vimalakīrti conducts a dialogue with a series of bodhisattvas from Mañjuśrī's entourage on the topic of non-duality (advaya). Again, Vimalakīrti ultimately emerges supreme from this contest. His "statement" on the topic is his famous silence, which crowns the whole series of exchanges and is implicitly framed as the "last word". This portion of the text was important for later tradition, including various Chan/Zen texts and schools, as a source of the notion that truth is beyond language, and specially framed acts of silence are its most adequate expression.

Chapter 9

Vimalakīrti uses his powers to conjure up a magically emanated bodhisattva, whom he sends to a remote Buddha-world to fetch a wonderfully fragrant type of food that is eaten there. The emanated bodhisattva brings this food back to Vimalakīrti's home, and he uses a single bowlful to miraculously feed the vast congregation in attendance. Vimalakīrti takes the occasion to deliver a discourse on the necessity of suffering as a means of teaching for the beings in Śākyamuni's Sahā world.

Chapter 10

Vimalakīrti picks up the entire assembly in his room in one hand, and miraculously transports it to Āmrapālī's garden (the scene we left in the opening chapter), where they visit the Buddha and Ānanda. When Ānanda smells the fragrance of the wonderful food described in the previous chapter, it is used as the occasion for a teaching that describes how the Buddhas accomplish their teaching and liberation of sentient beings by all means conceivable (and inconceivable!). Ānanda concedes that śrāvakas are inferior to bodhisattvas, and Vimalakīrti delivers another teaching.

Chapter 11

Vimalakīrti explains how he views the Buddha. This teaching is conveyed by a series of negations. The Buddha reveals to Śāriputra that Vimalakīrti is in fact a bodhisattva from the Buddha-world Abhirati, which is created and overseen by the Buddha Akṣobhya. In order to show the assembly in Āmrapālī's garden this world, Vimalakīrti uses his prodigious powers to bring the entire world into the garden. Śākyamuni Buddha predicts to all present that they will be reborn in Abhirati, and Vimalakīrti puts the Buddha-world back where it came from.

Chapter 12

The text closes with formulaic statements that the teaching it delivers should be preserved and transmitted. A new sermon expounds a series of characteristics of inferior bodhisattvas, which prevent them attaining the highest attainments. The Buddha entrusts the sūtra to Maitreya, in order that sentient beings of future ages may also be able to hear it.

== Themes ==
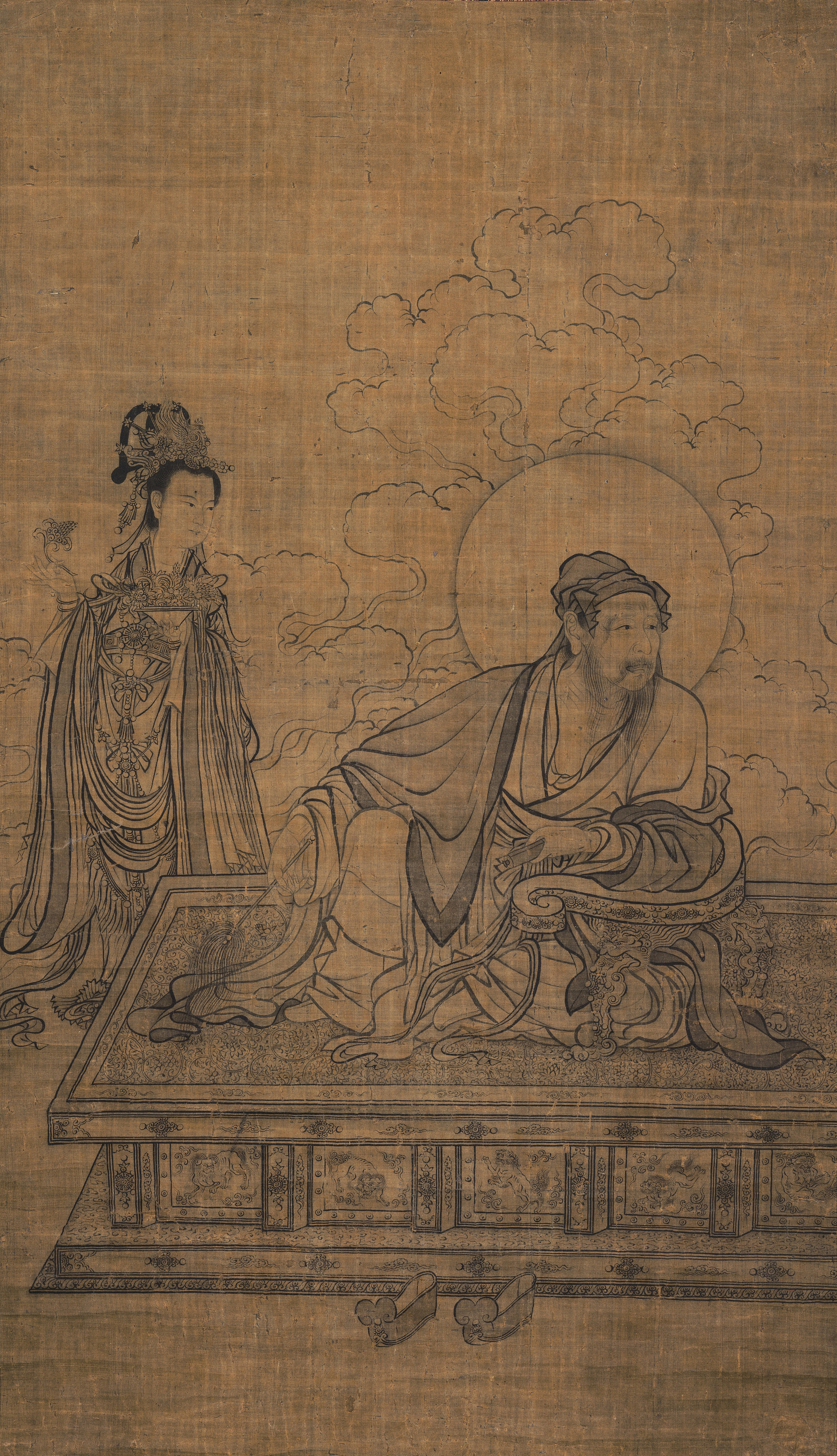
Silk painting of Vimalakirti, Southern Song dynasty (1127-1279). Kept in Kyoto National Museum, Japan

According to Fan Muyou, the Vimalakīrtinirdeśa contains numerous philosophical and doctrinal themes, including:

- the ignorance and delusion of the sravakas,
- the superiority of Mahayana over Hinayana,
- the transcendental body of a tathagata,
- the ambivalence of the sexes
- the benevolent and saving power of the bodhisattvas
- Emptiness (śūnyatā)

=== Śūnyatā ===
According to Etienne Lamotte, the Vimalakīrtinirdeśa is one of the oldest Mahayana sutras and contains the madhyamika philosophy of emptiness (Śūnyatā) in a raw state (which may have served as a foundation for Nagarjuna's school). In his translation of the sutra (L'Enseignement de Vimalakīrti (Vimalakīrtinirdeśa)), Lamotte outlines the major theses of the madhyamaka school and shows how the Vimalakīrtinirdeśa contains all of these. Some of these major ideas include:

- All dharmas are without self-nature (niḥsvabhāva) and are empty of self-nature (svabhāva-śūnya)
- All dharmas are originally calm (ādiśānta) and naturally nirvana-ized (prakṛtiparinirvṛta). Lamotte states: “For the Madhyamaka, dharmas which do not arise at all are not produced by reason of causes and do not enter the round of rebirth: thus they are nirvana-ized. For them, samsara is intermixed with nirvana.” This agrees with Mūlamadhyamakakārikā 25.19–20: "There is nothing whatsoever of samsara distinguishing (it) from nirvana. There is nothing whatsoever of nirvana distinguishing it from samsara."
- Dharmas are without marks (alakṣṇa) and consequently inexpressible (anabhilāpya) and unthinkable.
- All dharmas are the same (sama) and without duality (advaya). Since dharmas are devoid of nature and empty, they are essentially identical, as shown in the verse from the Mūlamadhyamakakārikā that reads: “Being, from the absolute point of view, equally without production and equally without birth, all dharmas are the same from the absolute point of view.”

Burton Watson also argues that the doctrine of emptiness is the central teaching of this sutra, along with the related idea that since all dharmas are of the same nature, they are non-dual, having a single ultimate quality.

=== Silence ===
The Vimalakīrti-nirdeśa "offers us two dramatic and contrasting moments of silence. The first of these [is] the silence of Śāriputra", who is rendered silent during an exchange with a goddess:

Śāriputra abandons speech too quickly, after all. He has been asked a question in a particular context [...] to refuse to speak at such a point is neither an indication of wisdom, nor a means of imparting wisdom, but at best a refusal to make progress [...] Śāriputra's failed silence is but a contrastive prelude to Vimalakīrti's far more articulate silence.

Vimalakīrti remains silent while discussing the subject of emptiness with an assembly of bodhisattvas. The bodhisattvas give a variety of answers on the question what non-duality is. Mañjuśrī is the last bodhisattva to answer, and says that "by giving an explanation they have already fallen into dualism". Vimalakīrti, in his turn, answers with silence. (Note: This dialogue is being treated in case 84 of the Hekiganroku)

With this emphasis on silence the Vimalakīrti-nirdeśa served as a forerunner of the approach of the Ch'an/Zen tradition, with its avoidance of positive statements on 'ultimate reality':

The Zen tradition is avowedly the Buddhism of Vimalakirti's silence—a claim that is explicitly reinforced by the practice of silent meditation.

But it does not mean that language is to be discredited completely:

Language is not, according to any Mahāyāna school, to be abandoned at the outset; it is not, whatever its limitations, a useless or a wholly misleading cognitive vehicle. To adopt an aphasia or cognitive quietism from the start would be pointless, and, as the Goddess notes, contrary to the practice of the Buddha himself, who uttered an enormous number of words during his career. But of course the episode gets its point precisely from the fact that Buddhist literature is replete with a rhetoric of silence—with episodes of especially significant silence—and indeed, as we discover a mere two chapters later in this very sutra.

== East Asian Commentaries ==
The Vimalakīrti was the object of much commentary activity in East Asian Buddhism. By contrast, no commentaries are known in India or Tibet. A fragment of a very early commentary, conceivably dating before the end of the fourth century, has been preserved in manuscript form, and taken as the object of a monographic study.

Another important text, the Zhu Weimojie jing 注維摩詰經 (which modern scholarship has shown to be the product of a complex history), transmits what is actually a set of interrelated commentaries ascribed to scholars among the very translation team that produced the second Chinese translation at the beginning of the fifth century, including Kumārajīva himself.

Other relatively early commentaries were produced by Jingying Huiyuan 淨影慧遠 (523–592): Wuimo yiji 維摩義記 T1776; Zhiyi 智顗 (538–597): Weimo jing xuanshu 維摩經玄疏; Jizang 吉藏 (549–623): Jingming xuanlun 淨名玄論 T1780 and Weimo jing yishu 維摩經義疏 T1781; [Kiu]Ji [窺]基 (632–682): Shuo Wugoucheng jing shu 說無垢稱經疏 T1782; and Zhanran 湛然 (711–782): Weimo jing lüeshu 維摩經略疏 T1778. Yet another significant commentary is the Yuimagyō gisho 維摩経義疏, or Commentary on the Vimalakīrti Sūtra, ascribed to Prince Shōtoku 聖徳太子 (574–622), an early work of Japanese Buddhism, which is said to be based on the commentary of the Liang dynasty Chinese monk Zhizang 智藏 (458–522 CE).

The Heavenly Maiden Scatters Flowers in Chinese opera

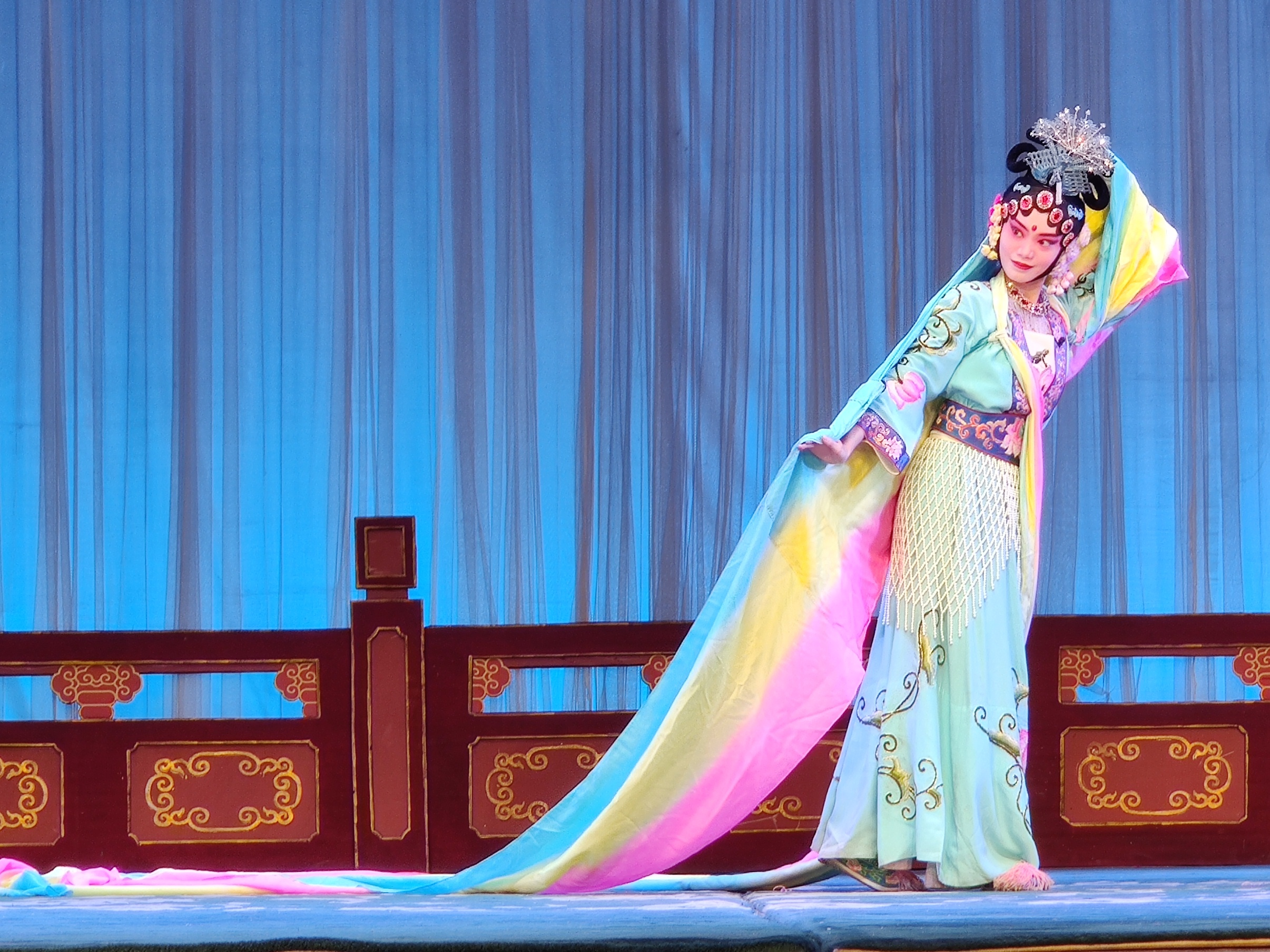
The Heavenly Maiden in Han opera

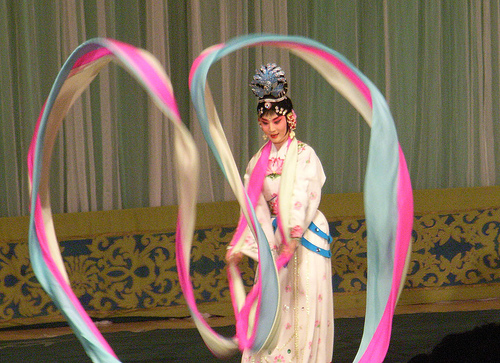
The Heavenly Maiden in Peking opera

== Other influence in East Asia ==
The impact of the Vimalakīrti-nirdeśa can also be traced in many other dimensions of East Asian culture. Large numbers of manuscript copies of the text survive in collections from Dunhuang 敦煌 and elsewhere. The text had a major impact on the arts, including visual art, but also poetry. The self-chosen soubriquet of the Tang poet Wang Wei 王維 (699–759), for instance, means nothing less than "Vimalakīrti". In the modern world, the famous Peking opera "The Heavenly Maiden Scatters Flowers" 天女散花, created by Mei Lanfang 梅蘭芳 (1894–1961), also took as its basis the dramatic encounter between the goddess and Śāriputra in Chapter 6.

The sutra is also thought to have been influential in East Asian Buddhism for its perceived humor (though the supposed humour of the text is a difficult topic, somewhat controversial in modern scholarship), and the perception that it provides scriptural warrant for various compromises between (typically monastic) austerity and engagement with secular life. The text has also been influential in Mahāyāna Buddhism for its perceived inclusiveness and respect for non-monastic practitioners, and is often interpreted as advocating an equal role for women in Buddhism.

One context in which the text was especially popular was the Chan/Zen 禪 school. However, McRae also notes that the sūtra was not used as an object of devotion, and that no school was ever formed around it, so that it does not seem to have enjoyed the degree of popularity of some other sūtras.

Richard B. Mather traces multiple causes of the popularity of the text in China, including its "brash" humor, its criticism of śrāvakas and Abhidharma, and the universality and "flexibility" of its outlook. Mather states that despite its disparagement of śrāvakas, the sūtra strong supports the Saṃgha, and the text intends to sanction the pursuit of the bodhisattva path by both monastics and laity without opposition to one another.

Hu Shih, an important figure in Chinese language reform in the early 20th century, wrote that the Vimalakīrti-nirdeśa was among Kumārajīva's three most influential translations (the other two being the Diamond Sūtra and Lotus Sūtra). As a literary work, he praised this version of the sūtra as "half novel and half drama, with the greatest impact on literature and fine arts." Nan Huaijin also regards this translation of the Vimalakīrti-nirdeśa as unique in Chinese literature, and forming "virtually its own literary realm."

According to Nan Huaijin's description of the Chan/Zen monastic system, the abbot of the monastery customarily lived in a small room patterned after that of Vimalakīrti's room. This room, as well as the abbot himself, were colloquially referred to as the fāngzhàng (Ch. 方丈, Jpn. hōjō), or "ten-foot square," "square fathom." This refers to a description of Vimalakīrti's apparently small and humble room, which the text portrays as miraculously transforming into a vast cosmic arena in which transcendent truths are taught for an audience of advanced bodhisattvas.

== See also ==
- Mahayana Sutras
- Tathāgataguhyaka Sūtra (cited twice in the Vimalakirti sutra)
- Index of Buddhism-related articles
- List of suttas
- Mahayana
- Vimalakirti
- Wang Wei, celebrated 8th-century Chinese poet who named himself after the Vimalakīrti.

== Sources ==
- Low, Albert (2000), Zen and the Sutras, Boston: Turtle Publishing
