= Charles Luk =

Personal life
- Born: Guangdong province, China

Religious life
- Religion: Chan Buddhism
- Lineage: Caodong
- Dharma names: Upāsaka Lu K'uan Yü

Senior posting
- Teacher: Xuyun
- Students: Richard Hunn

Charles Luk (1898–1978) (simplified Chinese: 陆宽昱; traditional Chinese: 陸寬昱; pinyin: Lù Kuānyù; Wade–Giles: Lu K'uan Yü; Jyutping: Luhk Fūn-Yūk) was an early translator of Chinese Buddhist texts and commentaries into the English language. He was born in Guangdong province, and moved later to Hong Kong, where he wrote most of his books.

== Buddhist practice ==
Charles Luk often used the title Upāsaka (居士), e.g. "Upāsaka Lu K'uan Yü" (陸寬昱居士), referring to his role as a devout lay follower of Buddhism. His first Buddhist teacher was a tulku of Esoteric Buddhism, the Khutuktu of Xikang. Later he became a disciple of Xuyun, the famous inheritor of all five houses of the Chán school in China. Master Xuyun personally asked Charles Luk to translate key Chinese Buddhist texts into English, so that Western Buddhists could have access to authentic teachings to assist their practice. Upon his death in 1978, this task was taken on by his British disciple Richard Hunn (1949–2006), also known as Upasaka Wen Shu - who edited the 1988 Element edition of Charles Luk's book entitled Empty Cloud: The Autobiography of the Chinese Zen Master Xu Yun.

== Publications ==
Charles Luk contributed broadly to Buddhist publications in India, London, Paris, and New York.

Translations:

- Shurangama Sutra (1966)
- Platform Sutra
- Vimalakirti Sutra (1972)
- Some works on Daoist Neidan meditation.

Other works:

- Ch'an and Zen Teachings, First Series (1960),
- Secrets of Chinese Meditation (1964)
- Ch'an and Zen Teachings, Second Series (1971),
- Practical Buddhism, Rider, (1971)
- Ch'an and Zen Teachings, Third Series (1973),
- Taoist Yoga : Alchemy And Immortality, (1973)
- Empty Cloud: the Autobiography of the Chinese Zen Master Xu Yun (1974)
- The Transmission of the Mind: Outside the Teaching (1974)
- Master Hsu Yun's Discourses and Dharma Words (1996)
