= Śūraṃgamasamādhisūtra, The Concentration of Heroic Progress =

1965 book

Śūraṃgamasamādhisūtra, The Concentration of Heroic Progress: An Early Mahayana Buddhist Scripture, originally titled in French as La concentration de la marche héroïque (Śūraṃgamasamādhisūtra), is a study and translation of the Śūraṅgama Samādhi Sūtra (Śgs. (Note: Lamotte uses "Śgs." to represent both the title Śūraṃgamasamādhisūtra and Śūraṃgama-samādhi. In his book review for the T'oung Pao, Jacques May criticized this practice, believing it could result in a slight misunderstanding, so in his review he used "Śgss." for the title of the work and "Śgs." for Śūraṃgama-samādhi.)) by Étienne Lamotte.

The book was published in the French language in 1965 by the Institut Belge des Hautes Études Chinoises as Volume 13 of the series "Mélanges chinois et bouddhiques". Sara Boin-Webb translated the book into English. The Pali Text Society commissioned an English translation of the book, and it had been completed before Lamotte's 1983 death. Paul W. Kroll, author of a book review of the book's English version for the Journal of the American Oriental Society, wrote that "for whatever reason, it was never published." Ultimately the English translation was published by Curzon Press in 1999, in conjunction with The Buddhist Society of London.

== Contents ==
The first portion of the book is an introduction to Buddhological matters relevant to the text. The introduction is divided into two chapters. The first chapter discusses the contents of the Śūraṅgama Samādhi Sūtra, the sources of the Śgs., the Śgs.'s place within Mahayana literature, and the samādhi in the vehicles of the Bodhisattvas and the Śrāvakas. The introduction discusses the application, in both Hinayana and Mahayana, of the terms bodhisattva, deva, samādhi, and śravaka. The doctrinal matters, particularly the doctrinal position of Śgs. among the sutras of Mahayana, are the main subject of this section. The second chapter discusses the Chinese and Tibetan versions of the Śgs. The book has commentary on one Tibetan translation and six Chinese translations of the Śgs. After the second chapter of the introduction, the book has a concordance covering the main translated text. This index lists translations of Sanskrit terms, and includes a list of formulated phrases and formulae. De Jong wrote that the index was "detailed" and "extremely welcome". The back pocket of the original French book has a photographical reprint of the Kumārajīva text.

The English version includes a new foreword, an expanded index, and an expanded bibliography. The new foreword includes a discussion on the scripture's title's explications, remarks on Khotanese fragments, and some reflections that were not present in the original French version.

J. C. Wright, author of a review of this book for the Bulletin of the School of Oriental and African Studies, wrote that "The reader may not always sympathize with Professor Lamotte's impression of a rigid 'before-and-after' 'un Mahāyāna en revolté".

=== Translation ===
The Chinese version of the Kumārajīva text Hsin śūraṃgamasamādhi ching, written circa a.d. 42, is the base text of Lamotte's rendering of Śūraṅgama Samādhi Sūtra. Lamotte used the 9th century Tibetan version of the Śākyaprabha and Ratnarakṣita, the Beijing Kanjur 'Aryaśūraṃgamasamādhi mahāyāna sūtra, in order to collate and clarify the text. For the Tibetan version Lamotte used a Japanese photochemical reprint of the Beijing edition.

Lamotte ordered the translation of the text into 178 sections. The reader may find passages corresponding to the Chinese version and the Tibetan version using a concordance. Lamotte stated that the Tibetan version has, unlike the Chinese version, two lengthy and partly versified passages. He did not translate those passages since his translation is based on a Chinese text. The original French versions has 357 notes within the actual Śgs. translation. J. W. de. Jong, author of a book review for the Orientalistische Literaturzeitung, wrote that the notes are "in fact brief monographs on particular subjects." Sanskrit equivalents to Chinese versions are present in brackets. This practice, used in his earlier works, was used in this translation even though he only translated the Chinese version. The book includes a reprint of the Chinese text, originating from the version published in the Taishō Tripiṭaka (Taishō shinshū daizōkyō) no. 642.

In the introduction Lamotte stated that Kumārajīva's text does not always have consistency in rendering technical terms and that it abridges stereotypes passages and phrases. Lamotte commented that the Kumārajīva version is, as translated by De Jong, "rigorously precise" (French: rigoureusement exactes). Lamotte stated that he used the Tibetan version to restore some phrases and technical terms that were omitted in the Kumārajīva version.

==== Analyses ====
De Jong wrote that "In general, L. faithfully translates the Chinese version, but he sometimes follows the Tibetan without always indicating he is doing so" and that in some instances "it is clear that Kumārajīva misunderstood the Indian original" but that Lamotte "allows the passage to pass without comment." De Jong states that in many cases the translation does not reflect the presumed Indian original text, the Chinese version, or the Tibetan version because the Sanskrit equivalents Lamotte added between brackets are based on a Chinese text and, "could never have been reconstructed from the corresponding passages in the Tibetan version." De Jong argued that in the case of Śūraṅgama Samādhi Sūtra it would be preferable to give full translations of both the Tibetan and Chinese versions due to divergences that are "so considerable".

Wright stated that "Lamotte's detailed examination of relevant Chinese bibliographical material is particularly valuable", and that the author was "firmly convinced of its reliability". Wright argued that Lamotte proves that there was a second-century Chinese translation "by interpreting and occasionally emending early statements in the light of later evidence".

R. E. Emmerick, an author of a review of this book for the Journal of the Royal Asiatic Society, wrote that in regards to scholars who have backgrounds in studying Sanskrit, "the feeling of the original Sanskrit is readily perceptible and the meaning of the text can be taken in at a glance." He argued that the practice "is rather like a scholar of Chinese obtaining the gist of a page of Japanese".

== Reception ==
Wright wrote that Lamotte's translation of the Śūraṅgama Samādhi Sūtra was "equally thorough and rewarding" to Lamotte's L'enseignement de Vimalakīrti ... traduit et annoté. De Jong wrote that the work was "excellent" but "not completely satisfactory" and that there were "problems arising" from the translation of the Kumārajīva text.

Kroll wrote that the English language translation had been written "with the same deftness, accuracy, and attention to detail seen in Sara Boin-Webb's translations [sic] of Lamotte's L'Enseignement de Vimalakirti and his Histoire du bouddhisme indien, des origines à l'ère Śaka. Kroll argued that "In French this book was a gem of thoroughgoing and wholly admirable scholarship. It is no less so in its English setting."

== See also ==
- The Teaching of Vimalakīrti (Vimalakīrtinirdeśa)
