= Masatoshi Ueki =

Japanese scholar

- Born: 1951 (age 74–75)

Academic background
- Education: Ochanomizu University (Ph.D.); Kyushu University
- Doctoral advisor: Hajime Nakamura

Academic work
- Discipline: Buddhist studies
- Notable works: The Lotus Sutra; The Vimalakirti Sutra

Masatoshi Ueki (植木 雅俊, Ueki Masatoshi; born 1951) is a Japanese scholar of Buddhist studies.

Ueki is an expert in the original Buddhist texts, including Sanskrit and Pali texts as well as Chinese and Japanese translations of sutras.

== Career ==
Masatoshi Ueki is a scholar whose research focuses on Buddhist philosophy and Buddhist thoughts. Born in Nagasaki, Japan, Ueki obtained his Bachelor of Physics and Master of Science degrees from Kyushu University. Prior to his work in academia, he worked as a journalist, specializing in fine arts and literature. In recognition of his exceptional storytelling skills, Ueki was awarded the "Cosmos, rookie of the year" award in 1992 for his piece titled "Circus girl."

Starting in 1991, Ueki studied under Professor Hajime Nakamura at the Eastern Institute. In 2002, Ueki received his Ph.D. (Humanity) from Ochanomizu University with a thesis entitled「仏教におけるジェンダー平等の研究──『法華経』に至るインド仏教からの考察」[Gender equality in Buddhism: An analysis of Indian Buddhism, from Early Buddhism to 'the Lotus Sutra'] From 2008 to 2013, Ueki worked as an adjunct lecturer at Center for the Studies of World Civilizations, Tokyo Institute of Technology. He has also taught at NHK cultural center and Asahi culture center

In 2008, Ueki published "Bon-Kan-Wa Taisho Gendaigo Yaku, Hokekyo", 1st and 2nd volumes (『梵漢和対照・現代語訳 法華経』（上・下）, [The Lotus Sutra: A contrastive translation between Sanskrit-Chinese-Japanese], which consist of 1) Sanskrit texts, 2) Chinese translation by Kumarajiva, and 3) Japanese translation by the author). With this work, Ueki won the Mainichi Shuppan Bunka Sho.

He also translated 'the Vimalakirti Sutra', which was found in Potala Palace, Tibet, in 1999, into modern Japanese, and published "Bon-Kan-Wa Taisho Gendaigo Yaku, Yuimakyo" (『梵漢和対照・現代語訳 維摩経』, [The Vimalakirti Sutra: A contrastive translation between Sanskrit-Chinese-Japanese]), and won the Papyrus Award in 2013.

In 2017, Ueki wrote a series of columns for the Nishinippon Shimbun titled "Bukkyo 50 wa"(『仏教50話』[50 Buddhist stories] ). His aim was to make the teachings of Buddhism accessible to a wider audience by explaining them using everyday concepts and common sense.

In 2018, April, Ueki was serving as a commentator on the NHK's "100 Pun de Meicho" (『100分de名著』[Introducing a literary masterpiece in under 100 minutes]) broadcasting program.

Ueki is a member of The Japan P.E.N Club, The Japanese Association of Indian and Buddhist Studies, and Japanese Association for Comparative Philosophy.

== Talks ==
Date	Venue	Original title	Temporary English title
2023/6/15	Democracy times	日蓮はニセ科学嫌いのフェミニストだった 植木雅俊さん 池田香代子の世界を変える100人の働き人77人目	Nichiren's Surprising Deep Compassion for Women by Dr. Masatoshi Ueki No. 77
2022/11/24	Democracy times	原始仏教・大乗仏教の溌剌とした女性たち 植木雅俊さん 池田香代子の世界を変える100人の働き人68人目	Vivid Women of Primitive and Mahayana Buddhism by Dr. Masatoshi Ueki No. 68
(1)2022/2/7 (2)2022/2/14 (3)2022/2/21 (4)2022/2/28	NHK (TV broadcast)	「100分de名著」名著116『日蓮の手紙』	Introducing a literary masterpiece in under 100 minutes, No. 116: "The Letters of Nichiren."
2018/12/22	Nishogakusha University	インド仏教の日本文学への影響——短歌・俳句を中心に	The influence of Indian Buddhism on Japanese literature: Tankan and Haiku as an example
(1)2018/4/2 (2)2018/4/9 (3)2018/4/16 (4)2018/4/23	NHK (TV broadcast)	「100分de名著」名著75『法華経』	Introducing a literary masterpiece in under 100 minutes, No. 75. The Lotus Sutra
2017/7/2	The Japan Science Society	原始仏教における知と信	Faith and knowledge in Early Buddhism
2017/3/15	Ikegami Honmon-ji	元政上人の詩歌と仏教	Poems by Gensei shōnin and Buddhism
2015/7/11	Embassy of India, Tokyo	日本文学に見る大乗仏教の影響——短歌、俳句を中心に	The influences of Mahayana teachings on Japanese literature - Tanka and Haiku as cases
2014/6/15	Japan poet Association The H award ceremony	お釈迦さまも詩人であった	The Buddha is also a poet
2014/2/23	The Papyrus Award commemorative speech	私の学問人生	My study life
2013/7/26	Soka University	絶妙だった鳩摩羅什訳ーーサンスクリット語から『法華経』『維摩経』を翻訳して	The excellence in Kumārajīva's translation - The Lotus sutra and the Vimalakirti Sutra from Sanskrit
2013/1/20	NPO Tokyo Jiyu Daigaku	仏教との出会いと、その後	An encounter with the Buddhism, then ...

== Publication ==
=== Publication in English ===
• Images of Women in Chinese Thought and Culture（with Robin Wang and Makiko Ueki）Hackett Publ. Inc., Massachusetts, 2003

• Gender Equality in Buddhism, Asian Thought and Culture series vol. 46, Peter Lang Publ. Inc., New York, 2001

=== Publication in Japanese ===
==== Translation ====
・Japanese Translation of Therī-gāthā: Pāli Terminology and Grammatical Analysis (2023)

・Japanese Translation of The Lotus Sutra: Sanskrit Terminology and Grammatical Analysis (2020)

・Japanese Translation of The Vimalakirti Sutra: Sanskrit Terminology and Grammatical Analysis (2019)

・"Therī-gāthā — Immortal Poems of Early Buddhist Nuns," (2017)

・"The Lotus Sutra — Translation into Modern Language of a Sanskrit Original"(2015)

・The Vimalakirti Sutra (2011)

・The Lotus Sutra (2008)

==== Books ====
(some major works by Ueki)

Original title	English title	Date	Publisher
日蓮の思想——『御義口伝』を読む	The philosophy of Nichiren: Reading "Ongi-kuden", the record of the orally transmitted teachings	2024	Chikuma sensho
日蓮の手紙	The letters of Nichiren	2021	Kadokawa sophia bunko
法華経とは何か—その思想と背景	What is the Lotus sutra? The philosophy and backgrounds	2020	Kadokawa sophia bunko
今を生きるための仏教100話	"100 Stories about Buddhism for Living in the Present Time"	2019	Heibonsha, INC.
江戸の大詩人 元政上人－京都深草で育んだ詩心と仏教	A great poet of Edo era, Gensei Shounin - Deepening the heart of poet and Buddhism in Kyoto Fukakusa	2018	CHUOKORON-SHINSHA, INC.
差別の超克——原始仏教と法華経の人間観	Overcoming Discrimination - The view of the human in the Early Buddhism and the Lotus Sutra	2018	Kodansha Ltd.
法華経 2018年4月 (100分 de 名著)	The Lotus Sutra: April 2018 (An introduction to a masterpiece within 100 minutes)	2018	NHK Publishing
人間主義者、ブッダに学ぶ——インド探訪	Learning from Buddha as a Humanist －Visiting and searching India	2016	Gakuge Mirai Sha
本当の法華経(橋爪大三郎との対談)	The truth of the Lotus Sutra(Discussions with Daisaburo Hasizume)	2015	Chikuma
仏教学者 中村元——求道のことばと思想	Hajime Nakamura, A Buddhist scholar - Seeking the truth in words and thoughts	2014	_{Kadokawa}
思想としての法華経	The Lotus Sutra as philosophical thoughts	2012	Iwanami
仏教、本当の教え——インド、中国、日本の理解と誤解	The truth of teaching in Buddhism - Understandings and misunderstandings in India, China, and Japan	2011	Chuokoron Shinsha

==== Columns ====
『仏教50話』(50 Buddhist stories) (2017) Nishinippon Shimbun.

50 Buddhist stories
No.	Original title	Temporary English title	Date
1	紆余曲折	Twists and turns	2017/9/12
2	自分で考える	Thinking by yourself	2017/9/13
3	乞眼のバラモン	Eye-begging Brahman	2017/9/14
4	言葉が出来上がる！	Words developed!	2017/9/15
5	中村先生の励まし	Encouragement by Prof. Nakamura	2017/9/18
6	"人間ブッダ"の探求	Seeking "the Buddha as a human"	2017/9/20
7	釈尊の平等思想	Shakyamuni's idea of equality	2017/9/21
8	悟りを表明する女性	Women expressing her enlightenment	2017/9/22
9	女性の自立と財産権	Independence of woman and property rights	2017/9/25
10	女性の知恵第一	A woman of a top master of Wisdom	2017/9/26
11	"無我"という誤訳	"Anatta(non-self)" as a misinterpretation	2017/9/27
12	自己との対決の必要性	Necessity to confront one's self	2017/9/28
13	"真の自己"の探求	Seeking "the true self"	2017/9/29
14	インド訪問	Visiting to India	2017/10/2
15	「成仏」は人格の完成	"Enlightenment" as a perfection of character	2017/10/3
16	タゴールの思想	Tagore philosophy	2017/10/4
17	如実知見の困難さ	Difficulty of "perceiving reality as it is"	2017/10/5
18	過去を引きずらない	Overcoming the past	2017/10/6
19	盲信を否定する	Deny of blind faith	2017/10/11
20	釈尊の遺言	Shakyamuni's testament	2017/10/12
21	民主的な会議	Democratic meeting	2017/10/13
22	ブッダの神格化	Deification of the Buddha	2017/10/16
23	教団の権威主義化	Authoritarianism by the order	2017/10/17
24	莫大な布施と蓄財	Enormous donation and savings	2017/10/18
25	大乗の"差別思想"	Discrimination by "the Great Vehicle"	2017/10/19
26	法華経の平等思想	Equality preached in the Lotus Sutra	2017/10/20
27	怨みを捨ててこそ	Throwing away a grudge	2017/10/23
28	最後の講義	The last lecture	2017/10/24
29	自作の戒名	A posthumous Buddhist name by themselves	2017/10/25
30	法華経の導きか？	A guidance by the Lotus sutra?	2017/10/26
31	日系二世の菩薩道	A life as the Bodhisattva by a second generation Japanese	2017/10/27
32	龍女の成仏	Enlightenment of Naga princess	2017/10/31
33	ジェンダーフリー？	Gender free?	2017/11/1
34	葬式のおまじない？	Incantatory for funeral?	2017/11/2
35	納得できる訳を	Translation with full understanding	2017/11/3
36	掛詞が表す寛容思想	Tolerance expressed by pivot words	2017/11/6
37	宗派を超える視点	The viewpoint beyond each sect	2017/11/7
38	仏塔か経典か？	Stupa or sutra?	2017/11/8
39	聖地信仰への反省	Reflection to holy land faith	2017/11/9
40	人と法	People and the law	2017/11/10
41	巨大化した如来	Giant growth of Thus come one	2017/11/14
42	ブラックホール	Black hole	2017/11/15
43	ゼロと巨大数	Zero and large numbers	2017/11/16
44	白川義員さん	Mr. Yoshikazu Shirakawa	2017/11/17
45	報恩	Repaying kindness	2017/11/20
46	菅原文太さん	Mr. Bunta Sugawara	2017/11/21
47	偶然的必然	Accidentally but the inevitable	2017/11/22
48	『等伯』	Tohaku	2017/11/23
49	忘れ去られた詩人	A forgotten poet	2017/11/27
50	今を生きる	Living now	2017/11/28

==== Others ====
See Japanese profile
