= Vimalakirti =

Buddhist bodhisattva

Vimalakīrti
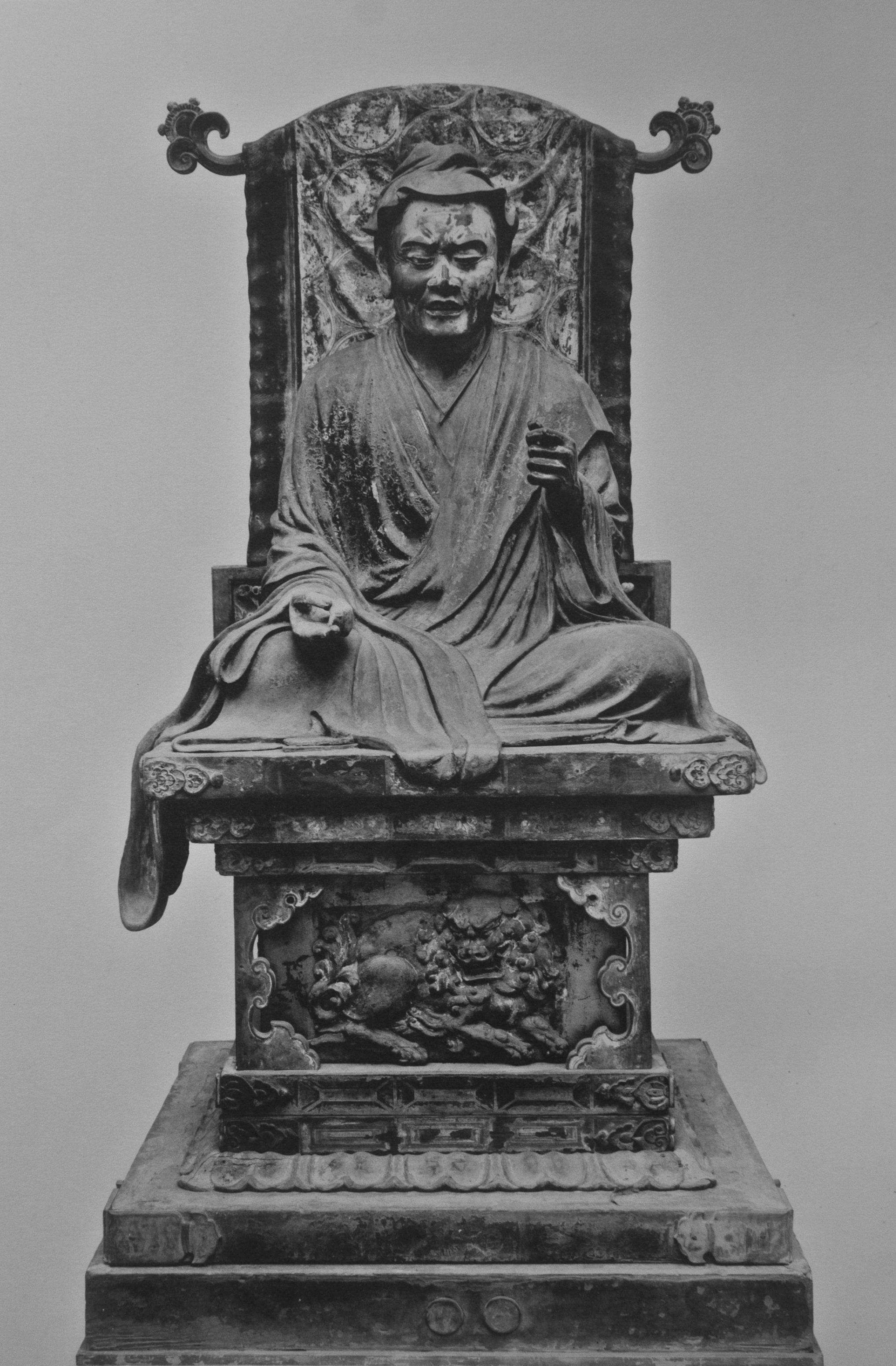
- Sculpture of Vimalakirti at the Hosso (Yogacara) temple of Kōfuku-ji, 1196 CE
- Sanskrit: विमलकीर्ति; IAST: Vimalakīrti
- Chinese: 維摩詰; Pinyin: Wéimójí
- Japanese: 維摩詰; Romaji: Yuimakitsu
- Korean: 비말라키르티; RR: Bimallakileuti
- Tibetan: ཝི་མ་ལ་ཀིརྟི།: THL: Dri med grags pa
- Vietnamese: Duy Ma Cật

Information
- Venerated by: Buddhism

Vimalakīrti (Sanskrit: विमल vimala "stainless, undefiled" + कीर्ति kīrti "fame, glory, reputation") is a bodhisattva and the central figure in the Vimalakirti Sutra, which presents him as the ideal Mahayana Buddhist upāsaka ("lay practitioner") and a contemporary of Gautama Buddha (6th to 5th century BCE). There is no mention of him in Buddhist texts until after Nāgārjuna (1st century BCE to 2nd century CE) revived Mahayana Buddhism in India. The Mahayana Vimalakirti Sutra also spoke of the city of Vaisali as where the lay Licchavi bodhisattva Vimalakirti was residing.

== History ==
The Vimalakīrti Nirdeśa Sūtra characterizes Vimalakīrti as a wealthy patron of Gautama Buddha residing in the ancient city of Vaishali which is now situated in the Indian state of Bihar. There is an ongoing debate as to the historicity of Vimalakirti with modern scholars grouping him with other figures in Mahayana literature, such as Avalokiteśvara and other bodhisattvas. Traditional scholars, however, take him to be a historical figure like Gautama Buddha, rather than mythic or legendary, and as such Vimalakīrti is not commonly venerated on altars or in tantric rituals, but as a prehistoric Zen/Chan preacher. Both groups agree that the descriptions of his acts in the Vimalakirti Sutra were allegorical in nature. The 7th century Chinese Buddhist monk, Xuanzang, reported that during his visit to the city of Vaishali, he was shown the house where Vimalakirti was said to have resided. Another 7th-century Chinese visitor to India, Wang Xuance, also writes of his visit to the site of Vimalakirti's home.

The Vimalakirti Sutra portrays Vimalakirti as the personification of skill in liberative techniques. Vimalakirti is respectful to everyone he interacts with including the Buddha however he is not intimidated by them either. He also claims himself to be among the "Great Sorcerers" (mahāsiddhas) and is capable of performing miraculous feats to teach fellow practitioners.

=== Other ===
In Chinese Chan Buddhist monasteries, a common word for abbot is Fāngzhàng (方丈) meaning "one square zhàng (equal to ten square feet)", a reference to the size of Vimalakīrti's stone room.

== Gallery ==
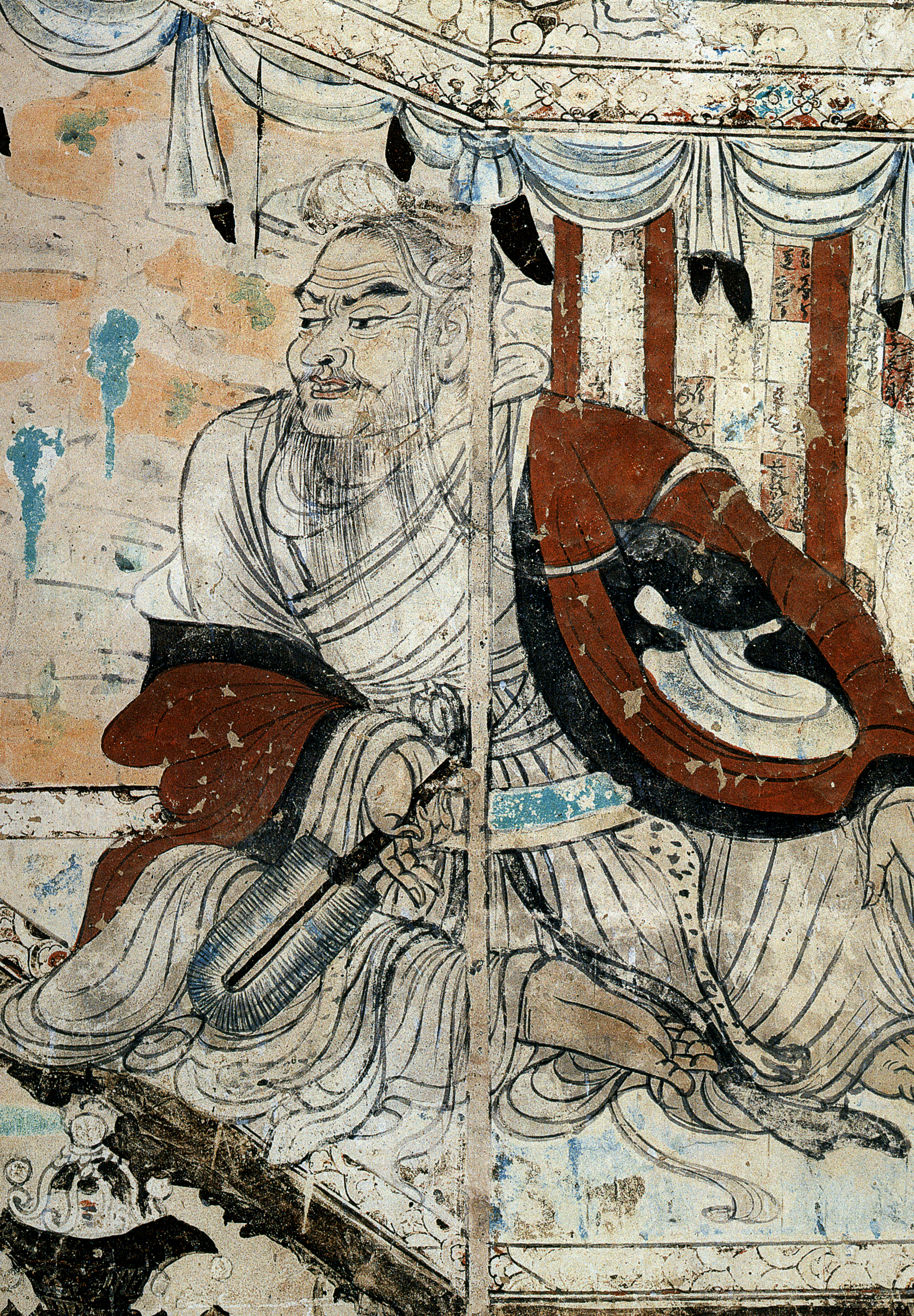
Vimalakirti, 8th-century wall painting, Dunhuang

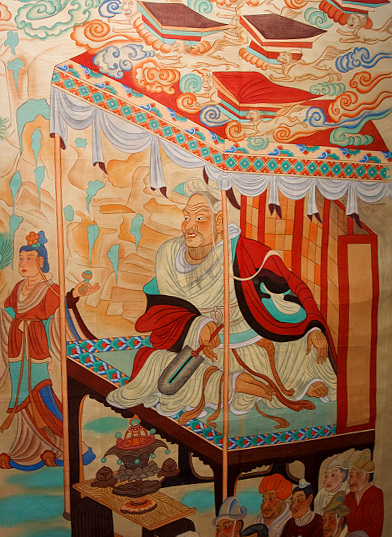
The layman Vimalakīrti Debates Manjusri, Dunhuang Mogao Caves

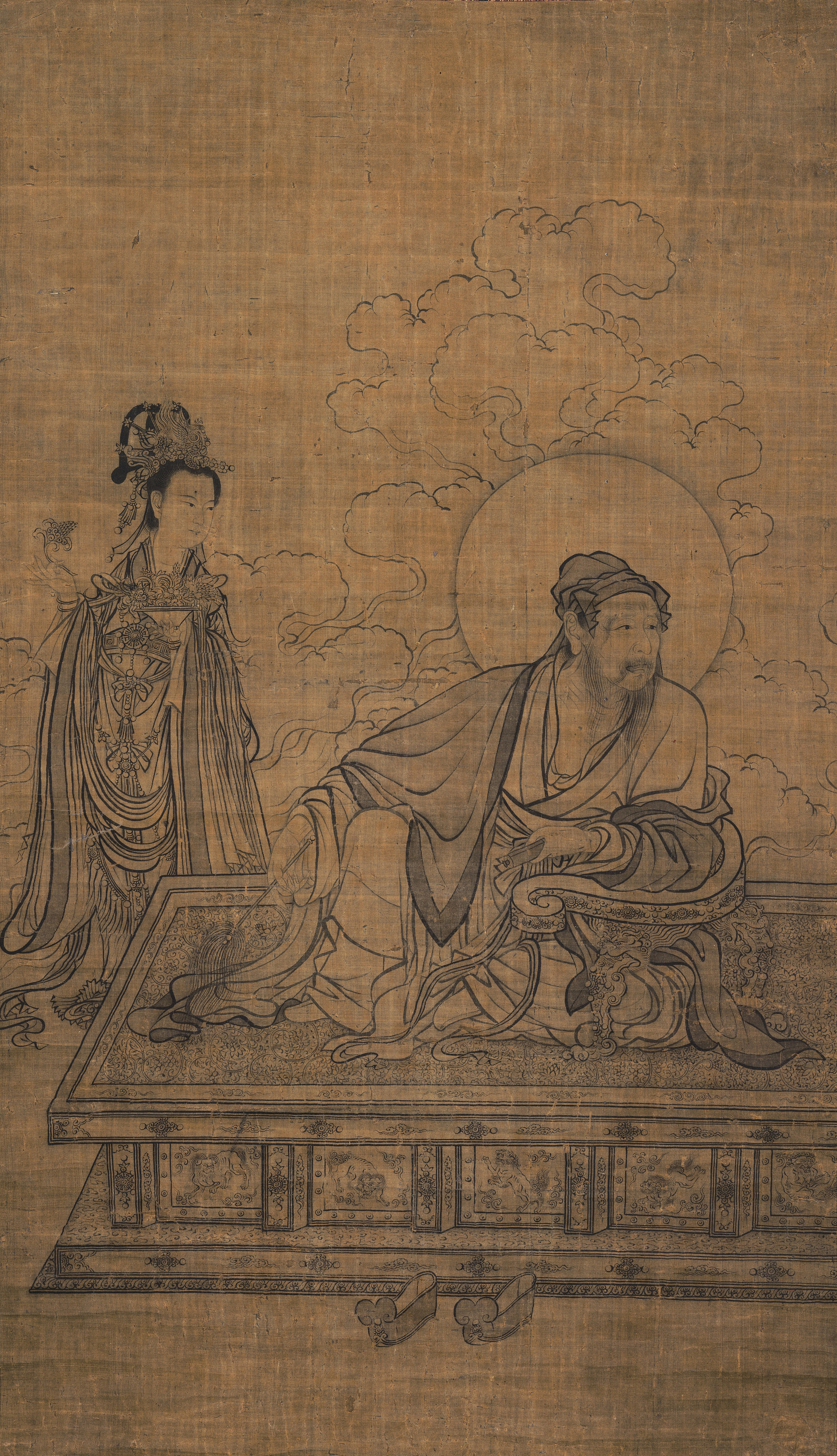
Depiction of Vimalakirti from the Southern Song period (1127–1279)

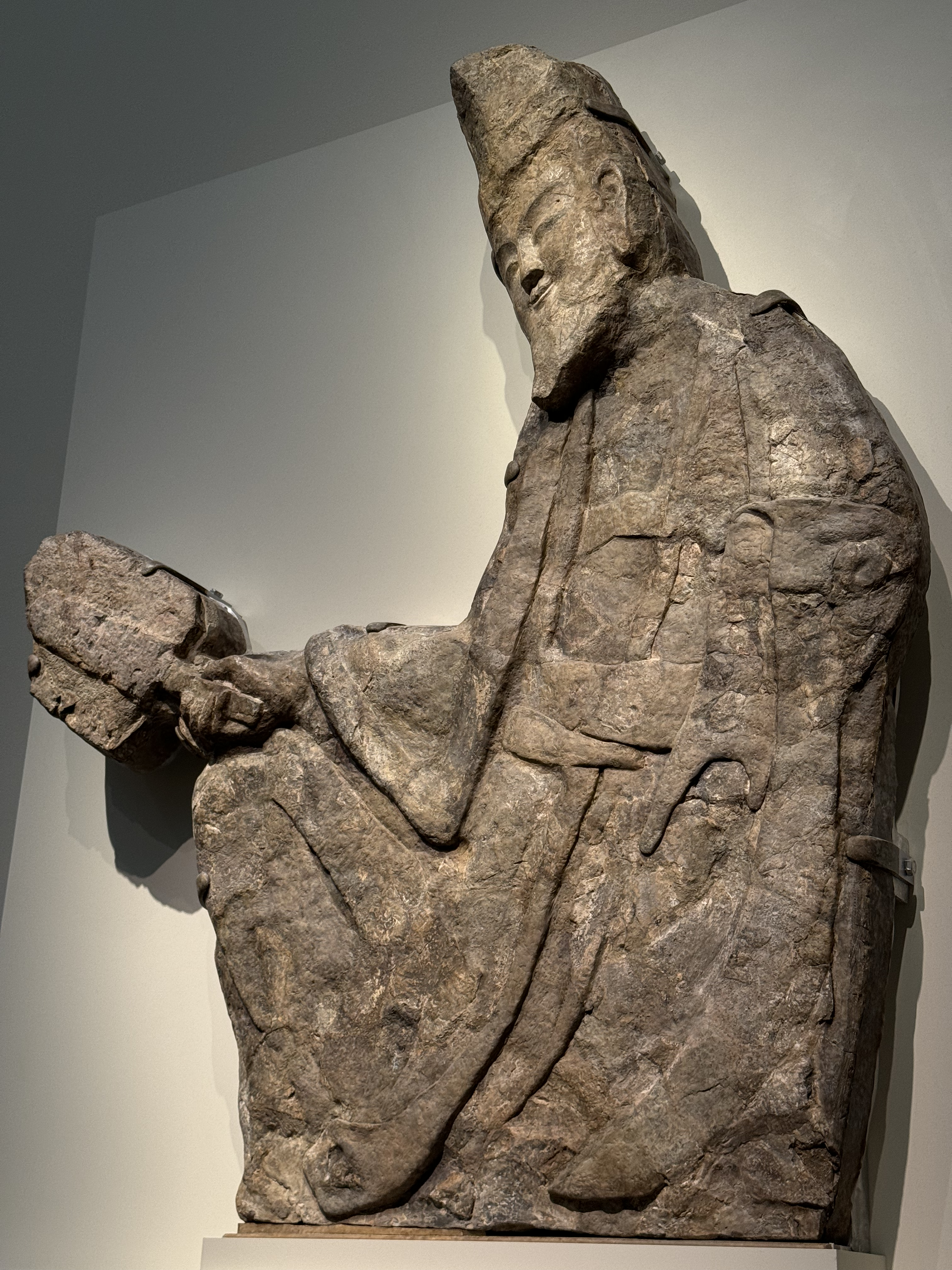
Relief of Vimalakirt from the Longmen Grottoes

== See also ==
- Wang Wei
- The Teaching of Vimalakīrti
