= The Teaching of Vimalakīrti =

1962 book by Etienne Lamotte

- Author: Étienne Lamotte
- Original title: L'Enseignement de Vimalakīrti (Vimalakīrtinirdeśa)
- Translator: Sara Boin
- Language: French
- Publisher: Catholic University of Leuven, Pali Text Society
- Publication date: 1962
- ISBN: 978-9042928282

The Teaching of Vimalakīrti (Vimalakīrtinirdeśa), originally titled in French L'Enseignement de Vimalakīrti (Vimalakīrtinirdeśa), is a study and translation of the Vimalakirti Sutra (VKN) by Étienne Lamotte. The English translation by Sara Boin was published in 1976 by the Pali Text Society. The original French-language book was published in 1962 by the Catholic University of Leuven's Institut orientaliste/Instituut voor Oriëntalisme.

Lamotte used about 200 Sanskrit and Tibetan manuscripts to collate and corroborate the material for the book. The advice of Lamotte, Arnold Kunst, and other scholars was used to complete the English edition.

== Contents ==
The book's introduction discusses the historical and canonical place of the Vimalakirti Sutra. In one section Lamotte lists the sources of the Vimalakirti Sutra including all of the canonical Tripitaka and Vinaya sutras, the paracanonical sutras, and of the Mahayana sutras. The introduction includes a list of translations of the Vimalakirti Sutra into Chinese, Khotanese, Sogdian, and Tibetan. In this section he gives an estimated date of the work as originating from the second century CE (AD) or third century CE. A concordance of the translations is after the introduction and before the translation.

The work also contains an analysis and adumbration by Lamotte discussing the Vimalakirti Sutra's philosophical tenets. The annotation includes identification of clichés in Buddhist Sanskrit and Pali literature, the identification of bodhisattvas and arhants, and discussion about the meanings and restitution of technical terms. The work also contains multiple articles. Longer ones are located in the Introduction and Appendices I and II while short articles about practices and beliefs are within the article annotation. The book's second appendix includes Vimilakīrti en Chine ("Vimilakīrti in China"), an essay by Paul Demiéville discussing the work's place in the Chinese Buddhist tradition. Richard H. Robinson, an author of a book review for the Indo-Iranian Journal, wrote that the essay was "beautiful and informative".

Robinson wrote that "The format of the work is unsatisfactory in some respects", arguing Lamotte should have moved more of the discussions from the translation notes to the appendices, and citing that "A great deal of material that is buried here and there in the notes might have been presented more accessibly." Robinson also argued that the usage of "many" of the Sanskrit terms inserted in the text was not necessary and that because Lamotte already used French equivalents of Sanskrit terms, Lamotte should have moved them to a French-Sanskrit glossary. Robinson argued that the Sanskrit terms would only be useful to a reader who knows Buddhist Sanskrit. In light of Robinson's criticisms of providing the Sanskrit, R. E. Emmerick, the author of a book review for the original French version of Śūraṃgamasamādhisūtra, The Concentration of Heroic Progress: An Early Mahayana Buddhist Scripture, another translation by Lamotte, argued that he was in favour of this practice by Lamotte.

=== Translation ===
Lamotte's translation is based on the Tibetan version of Bkah-gyur, located in the Otani Kanjur Catalogue, Kyoto, No. 843. and the book also catalogs variations and additions in the Chinese version of Xuanzang's (Hsüan-tsang) text as found in the Taishō Tripiṭaka. The passages of the direct translations of the Tibetan text are in normal large print characters while the Chinese-origin text is in smaller print text. The most important variations in the Chinese text are located in the right-hand columns while those of less importance are written in small characters and interspersed in the translation of the Tibetan text. In this text Lamotte places Sanskrit original words, derived from the original sources, in italics and within brackets after the French translations of those terms. These terms originate from direct quotations of fragments quoted in the Śikṣāsamuccaya of Śāntideva. Photocopies of Tibetan xylographs of the work are interspersed between the early chapters of the book. Lamotte stated that because others were unable to rebuild the original Sanskrit text, he did not attempt to rebuild the original Sanskrit text. The sources of the Sanskrit reconstitutions are indicated separately from the parenthetical terms. They are sometimes indicated in the footnotes.

Robinson wrote that the translation is "clear, methodical, and usually accurate". In regards to the consultations of the Chinese commentaries on the VKN Robinson wrote that Lamotte "exploited them for tales rather than doctrinal explanations." Robinson wrote that the Mahāvyutpatti seems to be the chief source of the Sanskrit reconstitutions but often the reconstitutions do not do so "and particularly when the restitution is doubtful one wants to know how Lamotte arrived at it." Robinson argued that Lamotte should have used asterisks on the reconstitutions and marked equivalents from sources not in the Mahāvyutpatti with abbreviations.

In regards to the translation Robinson praised Lamotte's translation of biographies, holy personages, parables, tales, and philological annotations, arguing that the translator "capably" translated the catechistic points of doctrine by "marshalling the data and drawing sound, straightforward conclusions." Robinson wrote that Lamotte "repeatedly blurs important philosophical distinctions, attempts to reduce the dialectic to the dogmatic, and slips away from the dual standpoint (relative and absolute) which underlies the systematic double-entendre of the text." Robinson argues that this caused him to not satisfactorily explain the central point of the sutra because the practice distorts the commentary on the ethics and the metaphysics of the VKN.

Robinson wrote that this version was "philologically the most adequate treatment of a major Mahāyāna sūtra to appear in a modern language." Robinson argued that Lamotte "has succeeded very well in his aim of revealing the Indic original underlying the Tibetan translation" and that his work "has resolved hundreds of points that were obscure in the Chinese versions, and has thus laid a solid foundation for further Vimalakīrti studies, as well as facilitating similar treatment of other Mahayāna sūtras not extant in Sanskrit."

=== English version ===
The English edition includes a new introduction from Lamotte and additional references and notes. The English edition does not include Vimilakīrti en Chine. The English edition has the same format as the original French edition. Paul Williams, author of a book review for the Journal of the Royal Asiatic Society, stated that the omission of Vimilakīrti en Chine from the English version was "naturally to be regretted".

== Reception ==
Williams wrote that the English edition was "outstandingly successful."

Robinson wrote that the French version was "excellent" and that despite the flaws "there is still no book in a European language that advances our philosophical and religious understanding of this text beyond that of the Sino-Japanese commentators."
