= Hiro Sachiya =

Japanese Buddhist philosopher (1936–2022)

Hiro Sachiya (ひろさちや, Hirosachiya; 1936 – April 7, 2022) was a Japanese religious scholar and a popular contemporary writer of Buddhism. His birth name is Yoshihiko Masuhara (増原 良彦).

He was born in Osaka Prefecture and studied Indian philosophy at University of Tokyo, graduating in 1960. Under the pen name Hiro Sachiya (derived from the Sanskrit Satya), he has written more than 400 books and articles. His interest in religion is not limited to Buddhism. He is mostly known for his comparative studies in all religions including Buddhism, Shinto, Christianity, Islam, and Confucianism.

== Selected bibliography ==
- Shaka to judai deshi (釈迦と十大弟子; Sakyamuni and His Ten Great Disciples) (1981)
- Kojinshugi bukkyo no susume (個人主義仏教のすすめ; The Promotion of an Individualistic Buddhism) (1982)
- Shi no sekai, shigo no sekai (死の世界・死後の世界; The World of Death, the World after Death) (1984)
- Okyo no sekai (お経の世界; The World of the Sutras) (1986)
- Bukkyo nyumon (仏教入門; A Manual of Buddhism) (1987)
