= Dhritarashtra (disambiguation) =

Dhritarashtra (IAST: Dhṛtarāṣṭra; Sanskrit: धृतराष्ट्र) may refer to:

- Dhritarashtra (Dhṛtarāṣṭra), a character in the Hindu epic Mahabharata
- Dhṛtarāṣṭra (Japanese: 持国天 "Jikoku"), a figure in Buddhist mythology, and one of the Four Heavenly Kings
