= Jiva (disambiguation) =

Jiva is the immortal essence of a living organism in Hinduism and Jainism.

Jiva, Jīva, or Jiwa may also refer to:

- Jīva (Jainism), the soul substance in Jainism
- Jīvá, a Sanskrit trigonometric term also known as jyā; see Jyā, koti-jyā and utkrama-jyā
- JIVA!, a 2021 drama TV series on Netflix

== People ==
- Jīva (nun) (fl. 4th century CE), sister of a king of Kucha, and Buddhist nun
- Jiva Goswami (1513–1598), philosopher and saint from the Gaudiya Vaishnava school of Vedanta Tradition
- Prakash Jiwa (born 1970), British Indian darts player
- Jiva Pandu Gavit, Indian politician
- Jiva (singer) (born 1982), Azerbaijani singer
- Jiiva (born 1984), Indian actor

== See also ==
- Jeeva (disambiguation)
