= Kumārāyana =

Buddhist monk

Kumārāyana (also Kiu-mo-yen) was a Buddhist monk. Kumārāyana renounced his wealth to become a Buddhist monk. He left India, crossing to the Pamirs in order to spread the teachings of Buddhism to the countries east of Central Asia, namely China.

Probably from Kashmir or Gandhāra, Kumārāyana never made it to eastern China for on his journey he stopped in Kucha, where the king, respecting Kumārāyana's eminence and wisdom wanted him to discontinue his journey, and stay in Kucha to become a royal priest.

In order to persuade Kumārāyana to stay in Kucha, the King introduced him to the wisest woman in Kucha, his sister Jīvaka. Jīvaka was coveted by many suitors for her great talents intellectual abilities. However, upon meeting Kumārāyana, Jīvaka was moved and they fell in love with each other. They married and combined their great talents. Though, they are mainly known in Buddhist history for the deeds of their son named Kumārajīva who, largely under Jīvaka's guidance, went on to become an erudite Buddhist scholar and translator. One of his more well-reputed translations was that of the Lotus Sutra.
