= Jeeva =

Jeeva may refer to:

== People ==
- Jeeva or P. Jeevanandham (1907–1963), Indian politician
- Jeeva (artist), Tamil painter, film critic and art designer V. Jeevananthan (born 1956)
- Jeeva (director) (1963–2007), Tamil movie director
- Jeeva (Telugu actor), Indian actor Kocharla Dayarathnam (born 1952)
- Lollu Sabha Jeeva (born 1985), Indian actor and comedian

== Films ==
- Jeeva (1986 film), Hindi film from India, starring Sanjay Dutt and Mandakini
- Jeeva (1988 film), Tamil film from India, starring Sathyaraj and Amala
- Jeeva (1995 film), a Pakistani film
- Jeeva (2009 film), a Kannada film
- Jeeva (2014 film), a Tamil film from India, starring Vishnu and Sri Divya

== Other uses ==
- Alternate spelling of Jiva, a concept in Hinduism and Jainism

== See also ==
- Jiva (disambiguation)
- Jiiva (born 1984), Indian Tamil actor
