= Po-Srimitra =

Po-Śrīmitra (Chinese 帛尸梨蜜多羅) was a Kuchean prince turned Buddhist monk and translator who journeyed to China during the early 4th century CE. He is sometimes regarded as one of the earliest transmitters of esoteric dhāraṇī literature to China.

== Life ==
Born into the royal family of Kucha (龜茲) in Central Asia, Śrīmitra renounced his princely status in favor of his younger brother and adopted monastic life. Around 307–312 CE, during the chaotic Yongjia era of the Western Jin dynasty, he traveled to southern China and settled at Jianchu Temple (建初寺) in Jiankang (present-day Nanjing).

Śrīmitra earned the nickname Gaozuo (高座, "High Seat") for his dignified presence and scholarly reputation. He quickly garnered the respect of high-level officials and aristocrats, including Prime Minister Wang Dao, Yuwen and Du family members, and regional elites such as Yu Liang and Zhou Yi. His manner—ranging from casual to solemn depending on his interlocutor—was admired for demonstrating both wisdom and cultural sensitivity.

He was skilled in chant and ritual arts and credited with teaching high-pitched Sanskrit chanting (梵唄) and translating early dhāraṇī texts, notably the Mahamayuri Vidyarajni Sutra ("Peacock King Sutra"), marking the introduction of esoteric ritual scripture in Southern China.

When high officials like Zhou Yi fell victim to Wang Dun's rebellion, Śrīmitra visited their families personally, reciting esoteric chants at funeral rites—earning admiration for his compassion and composure. He died in 343 CE (during the Xian’kang era) at approximately age 80, and was interred at Shizigang. A monastery called Gaotzuo Temple (高座寺) was later established at his burial site, reportedly by decree of Emperor Cheng of Jin.

== Translated works ==
Śrīmitra's translations were instrumental in introducing early esoteric Buddhist literature to China. While many of his translations may be lost, several key texts are attributed to him in the Chinese Buddhist Canon (Taishō Tripiṭaka).

His most significant works include

- Fóshuō Guàndǐng Bānruòbōluómì Jīng (佛說灌頂般若波羅蜜經), often known simply as the Guanding Sutra (灌頂經)(Taishō No. 1331). This is a large compilation of 12 separate texts dealing with various dhāraṇīs, consecration rituals (abhiṣeka), and instructions for protecting the faithful and the state. It contains methods for creating mandalas, summoning spirits, and achieving worldly and spiritual benefits. It is considered one of the foundational texts of Chinese Esoteric Buddhism.
- Mahamayuri Vidyarajni Sutra (孔雀王咒經) (Taishō No. 988). This is an early, short version of what would later be expanded into the famous Mahāmayūrī Vidyārājñī Sūtra. It contains the core narrative of the monk Svāti being saved from a snakebite by the Buddha's recitation of the Peacock King's dharani.
- Dà Guàn Dǐng Shén Zhòu Jīng (大灌頂神咒經) or Sutra of the Great Consecration Spirit Incantations (Taishō No. 1332)
