= Dhṛtarāṣṭra =

Deity in Buddhist mythology

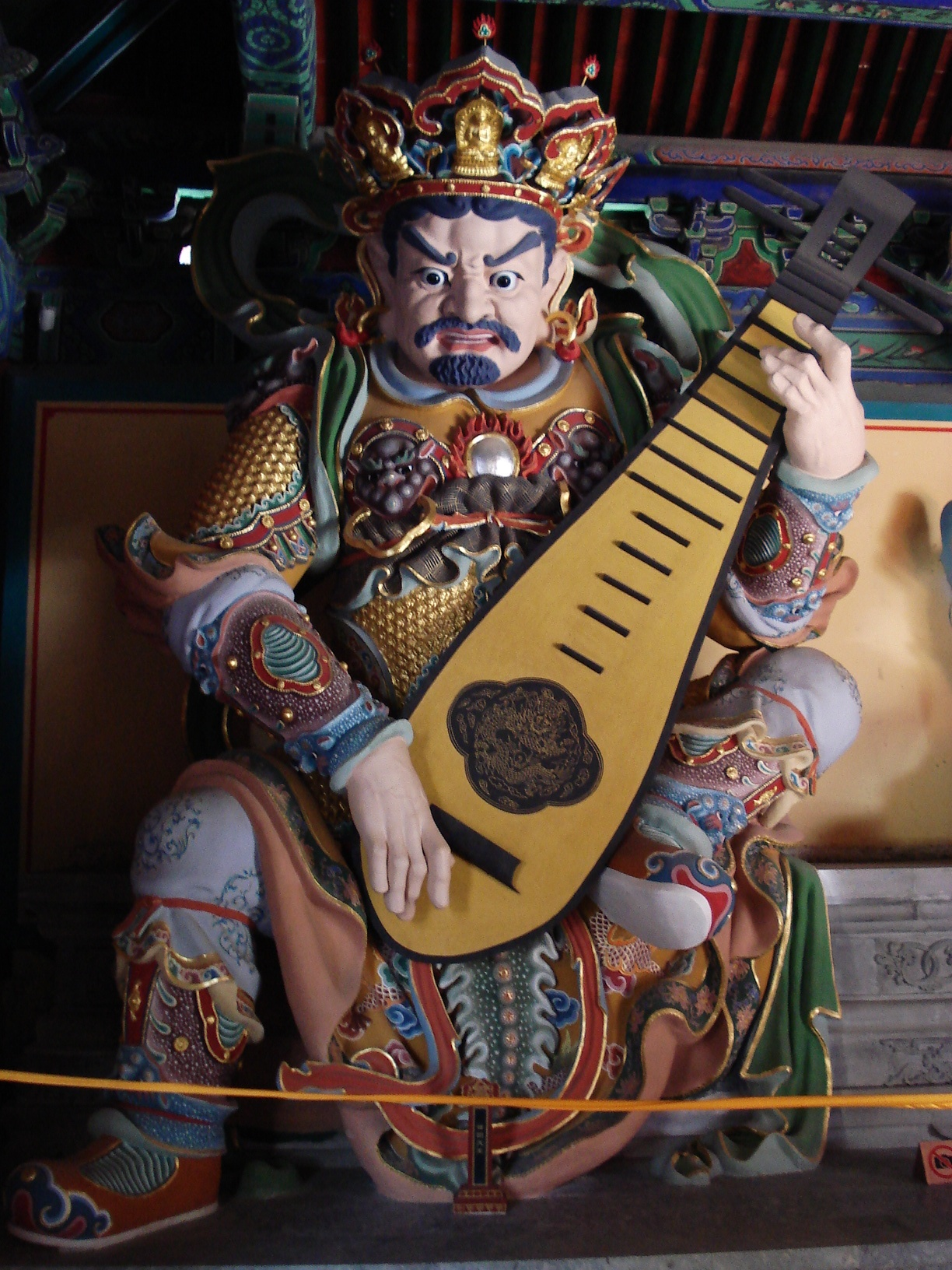
- Statue of Dhrtarastra (持國天王), in Wofo Temple in Beijing, China
- Sanskrit: धृतराष्ट्र; Dhṛtarāṣṭra
- Pāli: धतरट्ठ; Dhataraṭṭha
- Burmese: ဓတရဋ္ဌနတ်မင်း (Romanization: "Datarattha Nat Min")
- Chinese: 持國天王 (Pinyin: Chíguó Tiānwáng)
- Japanese: 持国天 (romaji: Jikokuten)
- Korean: 지국천 (RR: Jiguk cheon)
- Sinhala: ධෘතරාෂ්ට්‍ර
- Tagalog: Dhltalastla
- Thai: ท้าวธตรฐ; Thao Thatarot
- Tibetan: ཡུལ་འཁོར་སྲུང; Wylie: yul 'khor srung THL: Yulkhor Sung
- Vietnamese: Trì Quốc Thiên Vương

Information
- Venerated by: Theravāda: (Ātānātiya Sutta); (Mahāsamāya Sutta); Mahāyāna: (Golden Light Sutra); (Lalitavistara Sūtra); (Lotus Sutra); (Mahāmāyūrī Vidyārājñī Sūtra); (Mahāmegha Sūtra)
- Attributes: Guardian of the East

Dhṛtarāṣṭra (Sanskrit: धृतराष्ट्र; Pali: Dhataraṭṭha) is one of the Four Heavenly Kings in Buddhism, the King of the Gandhabbas, known as the guardian of the eastern direction and a protector of the Dharma. He is also widely revered in East Asian Buddhist traditions.

== Etymology and Names ==
The name Dhṛtarāṣṭra is a Sanskrit compound of the words dhṛta (possessing; bearing) and rāṣṭra (kingdom; territory). Other names include:

- Traditional Chinese: 持國天; Simplified Chinese: 持国天; pinyin: Chíguó Tiān; Japanese: Jikokuten; Korean: 지국천 Jiguk cheon; Vietnamese: Trì Quốc Thiên, a calque of Sanskrit Dhṛtarāṣṭra
- Traditional Chinese: 提頭頼吒; Simplified Chinese: 提头赖吒; pinyin: Títóulàizhā; Japanese: Daizurata; Korean: 제두뢰타; Tagalog: Dhltalastla; Vietnamese: Đề-đầu-lại-tra. This is a transliteration of the original Sanskrit name.
- Tibetan: ཡུལ་འཁོར་སྲུང, Wylie: yul 'khor srung, THL Yulkhor Sung, "Defender of the Area"
- Thai: ท้าวธตรฐ Thao Thatarot is an honorific plus the modern pronunciation of Pali Dhataraṭṭha.

== Role and iconography ==
Dhṛtarāṣṭra guards the eastern quarter of Mount Sumeru, the cosmic mountain at the center of the Buddhist universe. He leads the gandharvas (celestial musicians) and piśācas (flesh-eating spirits). In Mahayana traditions, he is portrayed wearing armor and holding a pipa (a Chinese lute), symbolizing the use of music to spread joy and convert beings to the Dharma.

He is also considered a protector deity in both Theravāda and Mahayana traditions. In the Pāli Canon, Dhataraṭṭha is one of the Cātummahārājāno or "Four Great Kings," each guarding one cardinal direction. He has many sons titled "Indra," and a daughter named Sirī.

== Veneration in East Asia ==
With the spread of Indian Buddhism into East Asia, Dhṛtarāṣṭra was localized in art, literature, and religion:

=== China ===
In Chinese temples, Chíguó Tiān is enshrined in the Hall of the Heavenly Kings (天王殿), usually as one of the Four Kings. He is associated with music and harmony, and his pipa represents the tuning of moral order. He is also part of the Twenty or Twenty-Four Heavenly Guardians.

=== Vietnam ===
Known as Trị Quốc Thiên Vương, he is said to reside on Mount Kiền Đà La near Mount Tu Di (Sumeru). He guards Đông Thắng Thần Châu, wears armor, holds a pipa, and protects Buddhism. He is revered during religious festivals and depicted as one of the Twenty Heavenly Kings. He is also mythologized as a deity guarding the Eastern Palace under the Jade Emperor.

=== Japan ===
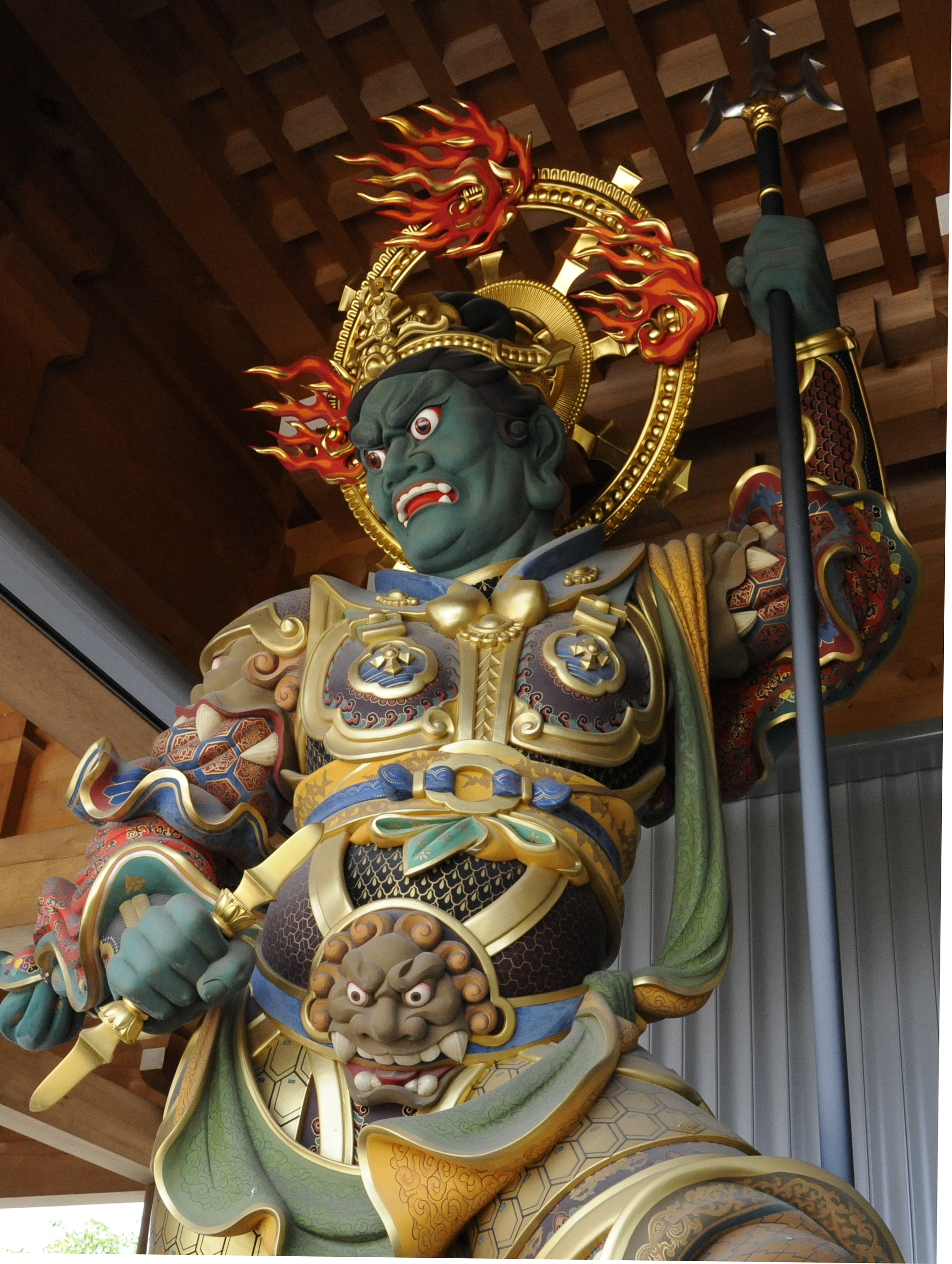
Jikokuten statue

In Japan, Jikokuten is depicted as an armored guardian, often holding a sword or spear and trampling a jaki (demon). Though fierce in appearance, he is a benevolent protector of the Dharma.

== Legends and Literature ==
In the Chinese classic Journey to the West, Dhṛtarāṣṭra participates in battles against Sun Wukong and other rebel forces in Heaven. In the Chinese novel Fengshen Yanyi, he is said to have been Ma Li Shou, a general who later ascended to divine status and was appointed the Heavenly King of the East.

== Related Figures ==
A separate figure named Dhṛtarāṣṭra also appears as a Nāga King in the Bhūridatta Jātaka, a previous life of the Buddha. This king was the father of the bodhisattva Bhūridatta.

== Dharma Instruments and Attributes ==
Common items associated with Dhṛtarāṣṭra include:

Pipa (lute)

Azure Cloud Sword

Mixed Origin Umbrella

Divine Mouse (Hoa Ho Diao)
