= Jīva (nun) =

Central Asian Buddhist nun

Jīvaka (also referred to as Jiva) was a sister of a king of Kucha, and later a Buddhist nun.

Jīvaka was a princess of Kucha (in Central Asia) in the early fourth century C.E. She was the sister of the King who introduced her to Kumārāyana, a noble Indian who came from Kashmir to China to study further. After two or three years they returned to Kashgar, renounced his fortune to become a Buddhist monk and thus stopped in Kucha on his journey. However, after meeting Jīvaka, Kumārāyana and she were married. Jīvaka is said to have possessed great talent and keen perception and understanding. According to the "Collection of Records concerning the Tripitaka", she "had only to glance over a written passage to master it, had only to hear something one time to be able to repeat it from memory." Combining their great talents, Jīvaka and Kumārāyana produced a son, Kumārajīva. When he was just seven, he had already memorised many Buddhist texts, and Jīvaka herself joined the Tsio-li nunnery north of Kucha. Two years later, when her son was nine, Jīvaka took him where they stayed for a year. Finally, they travelled to Turpan before returning home to Kucha. As Kumārajīva grew up Jīvaka the two are said to have become more distant, with Jīvaka supposedly relocating to Kashmir. Kumārajīva became a noted Buddhist scholar and translator.
