= Mahamayuri Vidyarajni Sutra =

Mahāyāna Buddhist scripture focused on the bodhisattva Mahamayuri

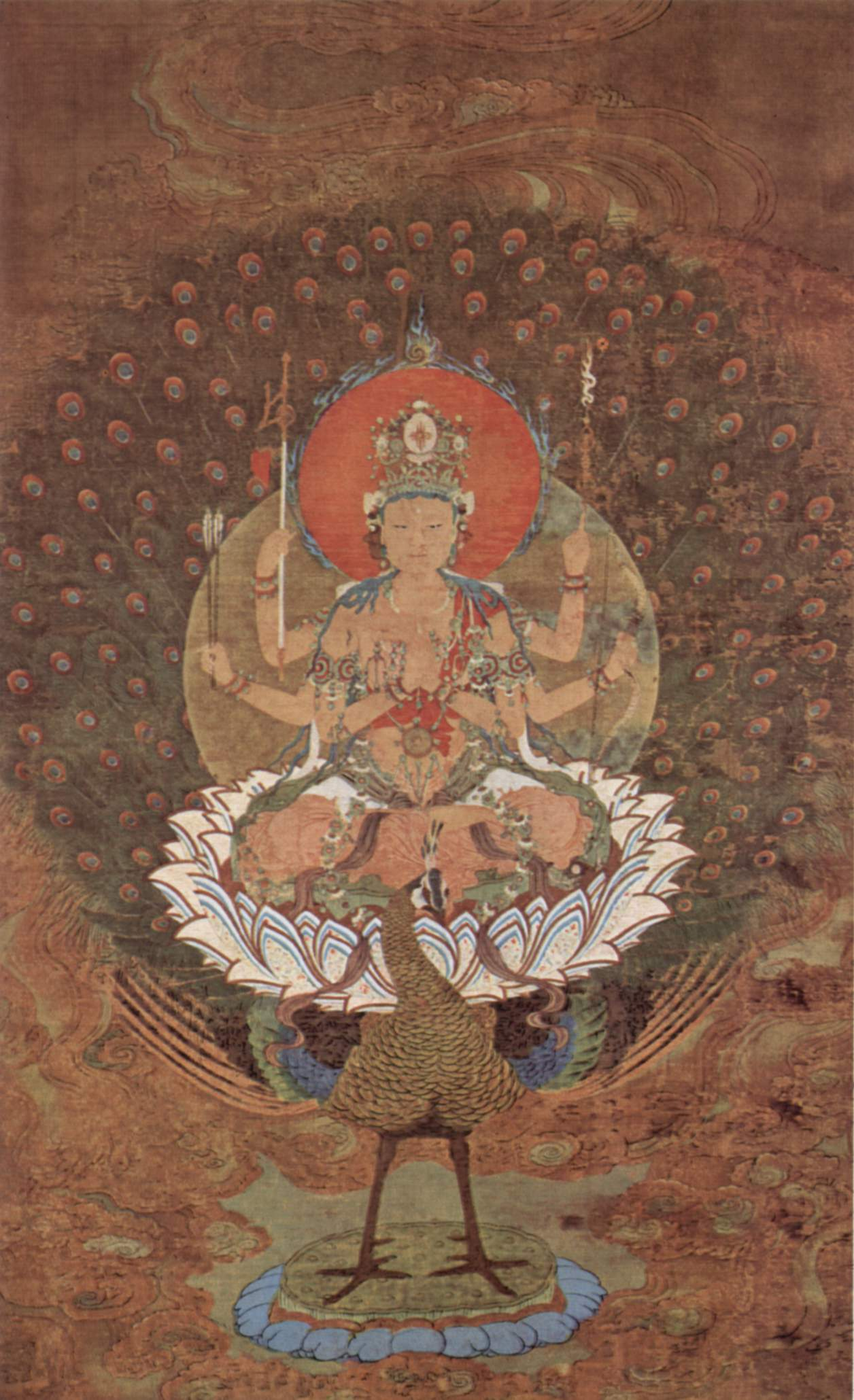
Song dynasty (960 - 1270) painting of Mahāmāyūrī (Kongque Mingwang)

Mahāmayūrī Vidyārājñī Sūtra, also known as the Peacock King Sutra (Chinese: 孔雀王咒經; pinyin: Kǒngquè Wáng Zhòujīng), is a Mahāyāna Buddhist scripture focused on the bodhisattva Mahamayuri, also known as the Great Peacock Wisdom Queen. The sutra is a protective text that invokes Mahāmayūrī's powers to eliminate poison, disease, and various dangers.

== Origins and development ==
The Mahāmāyūrī Vidyārājñī Sūtra began in India as a Buddhist text used for protection against poison and other dangers. It contains two stories about the power of the Mahāmāyūrī dhāraṇī. In the first story, a young monk named Svāti is bitten by a poisonous snake while collecting firewood. Ānanda finds him lying on the ground and asks the Buddha for help. The Buddha teaches him the Mahāmāyūrī dhāraṇī, which is said to remove the poison and save the monk's life.

The second story comes from the Jataka tales. In one of his past lives, the Buddha was born as the Golden Peacock King. He recited a protective spell each day to keep himself safe. One day, he became distracted by a group of peahens and forgot to say the spell. A hunter caught him in a trap. The peacock remembered the spell and recited it, freeing himself from the trap. Similar stories appear in the Mora Jātaka and Mahāmora Jātaka.

The early versions of the sutra did not all contain the same stories. Some focused on the Golden Peacock King, while others told the story of Svāti. The older Chinese versions were much shorter than the later translations. Over time, more spells, gods, spirits, and religious instructions were added to the text.

A Sanskrit copy of part of the sutra survives in the Bower Manuscript, which was found near Kucha in Central Asia. This copy is similar to parts of the Chinese translation made during the Liang dynasty. The manuscript shows that the text was known outside India before its later Chinese versions were completed.

The Mahāmāyūrī dhāraṇī was known in China by the 4th century. Early Buddhist records mention two Peacock King spell texts brought to China by Po-Srimitra (帛尸梨蜜多羅) during the Eastern Jin dynasty. The original versions of these texts have not been clearly identified among the surviving Chinese translations.

Several Chinese versions are preserved in the Taishō Tripiṭaka. They include:

- Two early one-scroll versions, Dà Jīnsè Kǒngquè Wáng Zhòu Jīng (大金色孔雀王呪經, T. 986) and Fóshuō Dà Jīnsè Kǒngquè Wáng Zhòu Jīng (佛說大金色孔雀王呪經, T. 987). The translators of these versions are unknown.
- A one-scroll version called Kǒngquè Wáng Zhòu Jīng (孔雀王呪經, T. 988), traditionally listed under Kumārajīva's name and dated to the early 5th century.
- A two-scroll version of Kǒngquè Wáng Zhòu Jīng (孔雀王呪經, T. 984), translated by Saṅghabhara (僧伽婆羅) during the Liang dynasty, between 502 and 520.
- A three-scroll version called Fóshuō Dà Kǒngquè Zhòu Wáng Jīng (佛說大孔雀呪王經, T. 985), translated by Yijing in 705 during the Tang dynasty.
- A three-scroll version called Fómǔ Dà Kǒngquè Míngwáng Jīng (佛母大孔雀明王經, T. 982), translated by Amoghavajra during the second half of the 8th century.

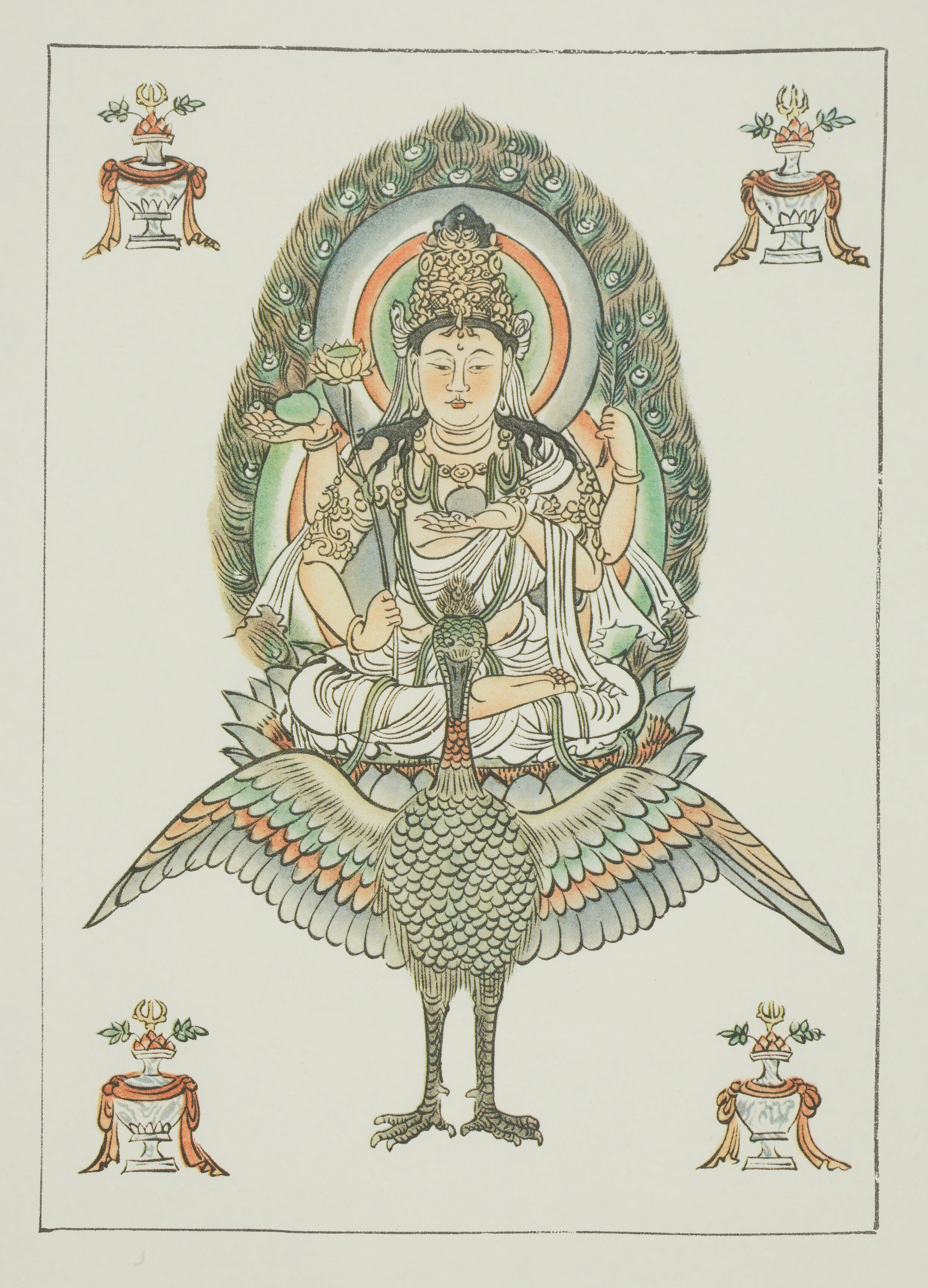
Image of Mahāmāyūrī (Kujaku Myōō) from the Taishō Shinshū Daizōkyō.

The later translations contain longer spells and more detailed instructions for Buddhist rituals. Amoghavajra's version became one of the best-known Chinese texts of the sutra. The text was also used in Japan, where Buddhist monks recited it during ceremonies for protection against illness and other dangers.

== Ritual practices ==
The Mahāmayūrī Vidyārājñī Sūtra is regarded not only as a canonical text but also as a ritual manual. From the Tang dynasty onward, it became integral to state-protection ceremonies in both China and Japan. Imperial courts commissioned rituals derived from the sutra to invoke rainfall, end droughts, avert warfare, and promote national peace and prosperity.

In Japanese Esoteric Buddhism (Mikkyō), the sutra, known as the Kujaku Myōō Kyō, is considered one of the most important texts for rituals of pacification and protection. The monk Kūkai, founder of the Shingon school, is traditionally credited with performing esoteric rites based on the sutra, including the Kujaku-hō (雲雀法; lit. 'Peacock King Rite') used for purification and spiritual defense.
