= Kucha =

Ancient Buddhist kingdom on the northern edge of the Taklamakan Desert

- 2nd century BCE–648 CE
- Tarim Basin in the 3rd century
- Religion: Buddhism
- Demonym: Kuchean
- History
  - Established: 2nd century BCE
  - Conquered by the Tang dynasty: 648 CE

Population
  - 111 CE: 81,317
- Currency: Kucha coinage
Succeeded by
Protectorate General to Pacify the West
- Today part of: China

Kucha (Note: /ˈkuːtʃə/ KOO-chə, also: Kuche, Kuchar, Kuçar; Uyghur: كۇچار, Кучар; Chinese: 龜茲; pinyin: Qiūcí, Chinese: 庫車; pinyin: Kùchē; Sanskrit: 𑀓𑀽𑀘𑀻𑀦, romanized: Kūcīna)) was an ancient Tocharian Buddhist kingdom located on the branch of the Silk Road that ran along the northern edge of what is now the Taklamakan Desert in the Tarim Basin and south of the Muzat River. The people of Kucha spoke Kuchean (also known as Tocharian B) and a local variant of Gandhārī Prakrit, known as Kucha Prakrit, was used by Kucha for official and administrative purposes, with evidence indicating that it remained in use until 6th century.

The former area of Kucha now lies in present-day Aksu Prefecture, west-central Xinjiang, China. Kuqa town is the county seat of Aksu Prefecture's Kuqa County.

== Etymology ==
Though the history of toponyms for modern Kucha remains problematic, it is clear that Kucha (Kuchar, in Turkic languages) and Kuché (modern Chinese) both correspond to the Kushan of Indic scripts from late antiquity.

Chinese annals uniformly record the kingdom's name as 龜茲 (Qiūcí) from the Han to the Song dynasty. Its earliest attestation is in the Hanshu. Commentators indicate that the name was pronounced specifically as 丘慈 (Qiūcí, Old Chinese *kʽǐwə-dzǐə) rather than the ordinary reading Guǐzī (Old Chinese *kǐwə-tsǐə). A later 4th‑century transcription, 屈茨 (Qūcí, EMC *khut-dzi), corroborates this pronunciation.

Attested forms in other pre-Islamic languages include Niya-Gāndhārī *kuciya, Sanskrit kuci-, Kuchean kᵤśiññe, Sogdian ’kwc’, and Old Turkic küsän.

Guzan or Küsan is attested in the Tibetan Annals (s.v.), dating from 687 CE. Old Uyghur and Old Mandarin transcriptions from the Mongol Empire support the forms Küsän / Güsän and Kuxian / Quxian respectively, instead of Küshän or Kushan. Another, cognate Chinese transliteration is Ku-sien.

In the 11th‑century Turkish lexicon of Maḥmud Kāšḡari, the oasis is recorded as Küsän and Kuča, reflecting its status as “a frontier of Uighur.” The modern Mandarin form 庫車 (Kuche) was later established in 1758.

Transcriptions of the name Kushan in Indic scripts from late antiquity include the spelling Guṣān, and are reflected in at least one Khotanese Tibetan transcription.

The forms Kūsān and Kūs are attested in Mirza Muhammad Haidar Dughlat's 16th-century work in Chaghatai, the Tarikh-i Rashidi. Both names, as well as Kos, Kucha, Kujar etc., were used for modern Kucha.

== History ==
=== Bronze and Iron Age ===
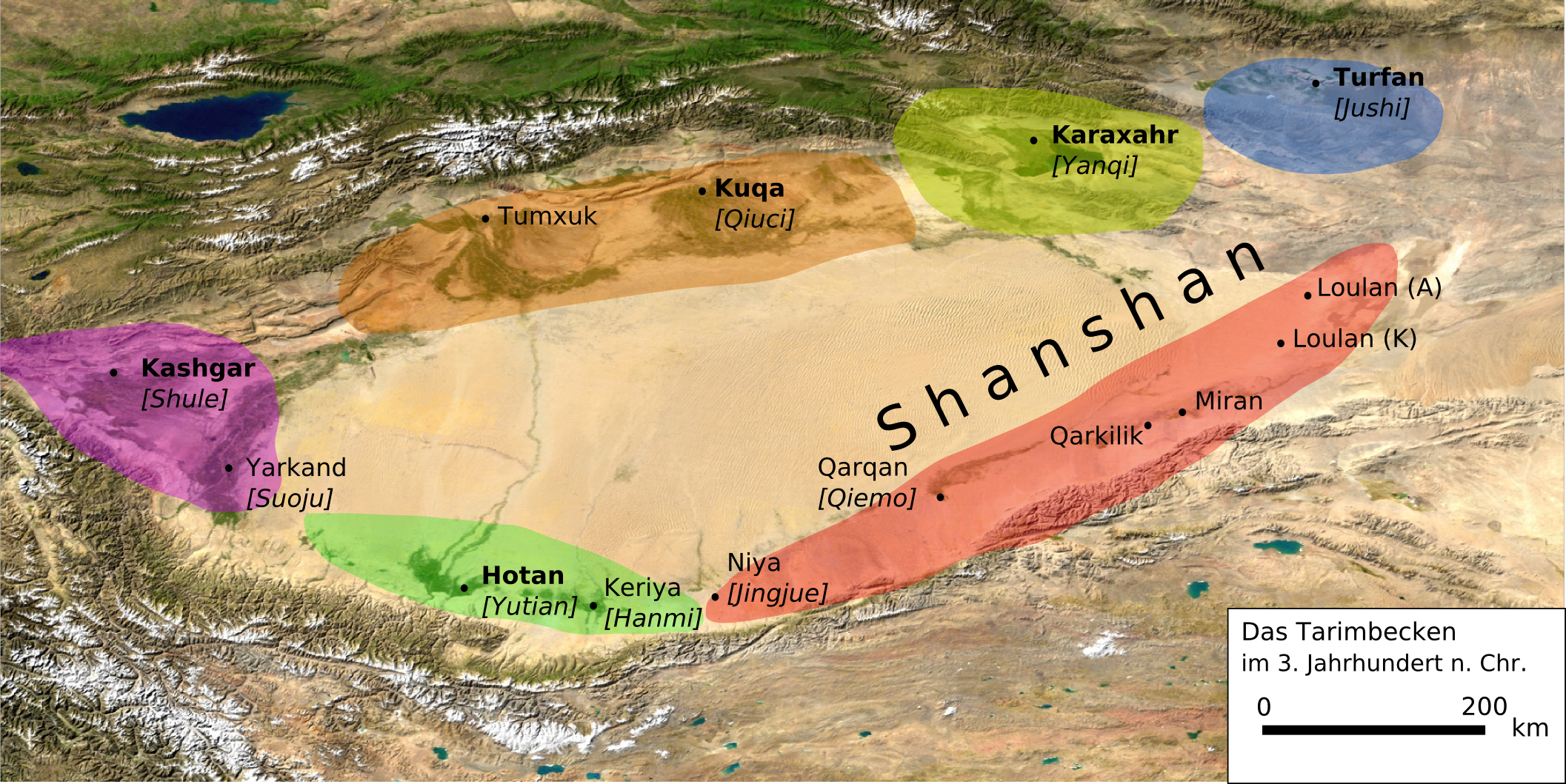
Tarim Basin in the 3rd century

For a long time, Kucha was the most populous oasis in the Tarim Basin. As a Central Asian metropolis, it was part of the Silk Road economy, and was in contact with the rest of Central Asia, including Sogdia and Bactria, and thus also with the cultures of South Asia, Iran, and the coastal areas of China. At the northern route of the Silk Road, above the Taklamakan Desert, many travelers passed through this oasis. This travel pattern led to exchanges in art, culture, and religion.

The main population of Kucha was part of the ancient population of the Tarim Basin known as the Tocharians, who spoke an Indo-European language known as Kuchean Tocharian. The Tocharians are associated with the earlier Afanasievo culture, a population derived from the ancient North Eurasians. Chinese sources from the 2nd century BCE mentioned Wusun populations with blue eyes and red hair in the area of the Ili River to the northwest of Kucha.

=== Chinese conquest under the Western Han Dynasty ===
In the second century BCE, the kingdom known in Chinese sources Qiūcí 龜茲 was controlled, as the other states of the regions by the steppe federation of Xiōngnú 匈奴. Chinese official and diplomat Zhang Qian traveled the area westward to visit Central Asia, during the 2nd century BCE, but he did not mention Qiūcí in his report.

According to the Hanshu (Book of Han), around 101 BCE, the king of Qiūcí (龜茲) received hostages, including Làidān (賴丹), the crown prince of Wūmí (扜彌). On his return journey to Cháng'ān (長安) after the campaign against Dàyuān (大宛), General Lǐ Guǎnglì (李廣利) captured Làidān.

Subsequently, Prince Làidān was ordered by the Han court to oversee the establishment of military agricultural colonies (túntián 屯田) at Lúntái 輪臺 near Qiūcí. However, a nobleman from Qiūcí killed Làidān, which led to an attack by a Han army commanded by Cháng Huì 常惠，only several decades later.

The daughter of the Princess Jieyou (Jiěyōu Gōngzhǔ 解忧公), who was married to the king of the Wusun, was sent to the Han court in 64 BCE. However, the King of Kucha Jiàngbīn 絳賓 stopped here on the way, wanting to marry her, which she accepted. In 65 BCE, King Jiàngbīn even travelled to Cháng'ān 長安 (modern Xī'ān 西安, Shaanxi) to visit the Han court and pay tribute.

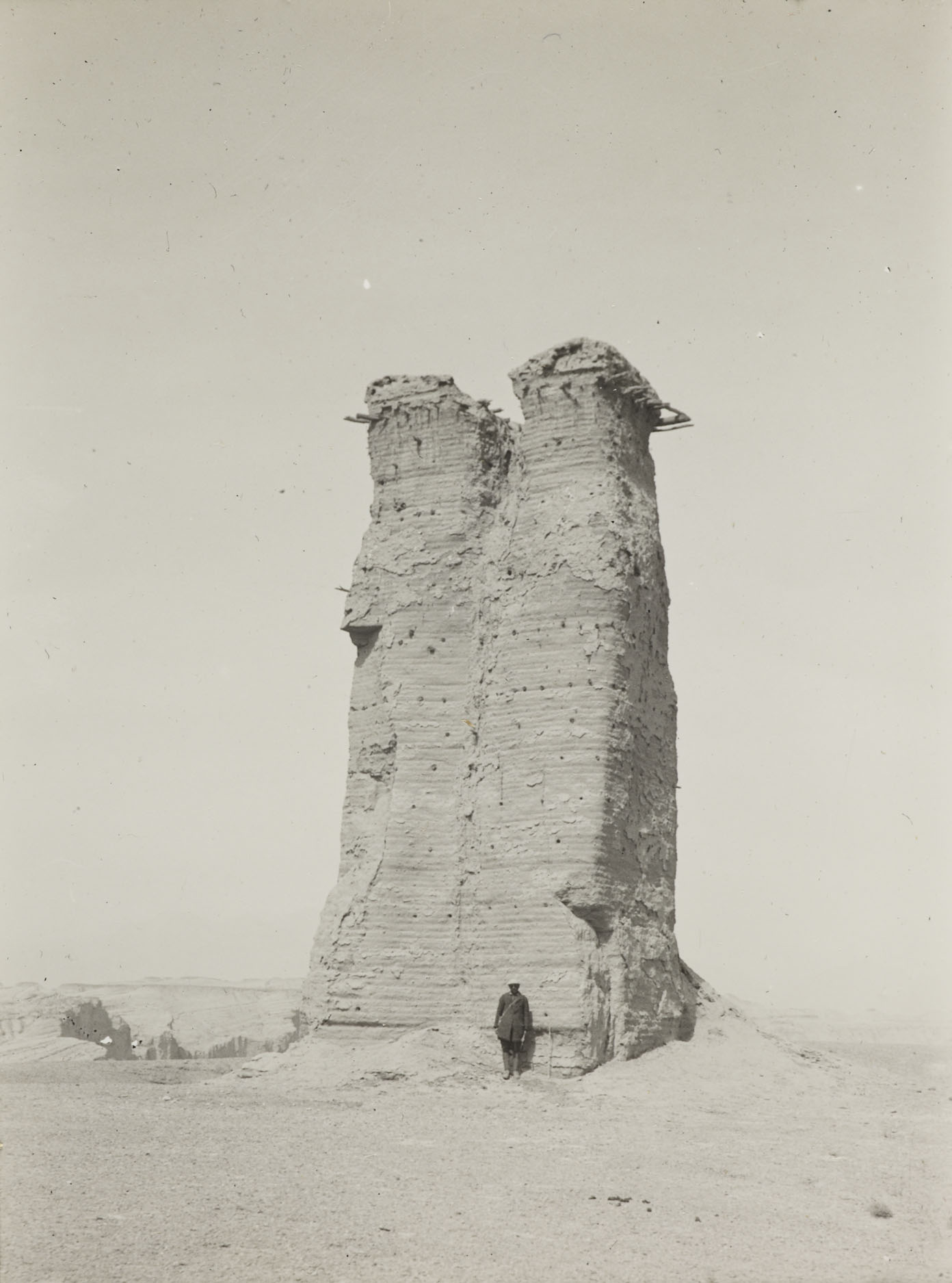
Kizilgaha Beacon Tower, built by a Chinese garrison during the Han dynasty, located north of Kucha

In 60 BCE, the Han court established the Protectorate of the Western Regions (Xīyù Dūhùfǔ 西域都護府), with its administrative seat in Wūlěi 烏壘, just east of Qiūcí 龜茲. King Jiàngbīn's 絳賓 son, Chéngdé 丞德, was granted the title of "Outer Imperial Grandson" (wàisūn 外孫), signifying his status as the son of an imperial daughter.

Following the fall of the Former Han dynasty and during the usurpation of Wáng Mǎng 王莽 (r. 8–23 CE), the city-states of the Western Territories (Xīyù 西域) severed ties with China and once again fell under the control of the Xiōngnú 匈奴.

According to the Book of Han (completed in 111 CE), Kucha was the largest of the "Thirty-six Kingdoms of the Western Regions", with a population of 81,317, including 21,076 persons able to bear arms. The Kingdom of Kucha occupied a strategic position on the Northern Silk Road, which brought prosperity, and made Kucha a wealthy center of trade and culture.

As an oasis town northward of the Taklamakan Desert, Kucha attracted travelers passing by along their journey on the Silk Road, serving as a rest stop for travelers and visitors and as a religious stronghold and political center. The Silk Road, despite its name, provided routes across Eurasia for the flow of cultures, religions, ideas, and goods and services, and Kucha played a role in this exchange. Kucha and the archaeological discoveries in the surrounding region provide insight into the city's significance during the time of the Silk Road.

=== Kucha during the Eastern Han Dynasty ===
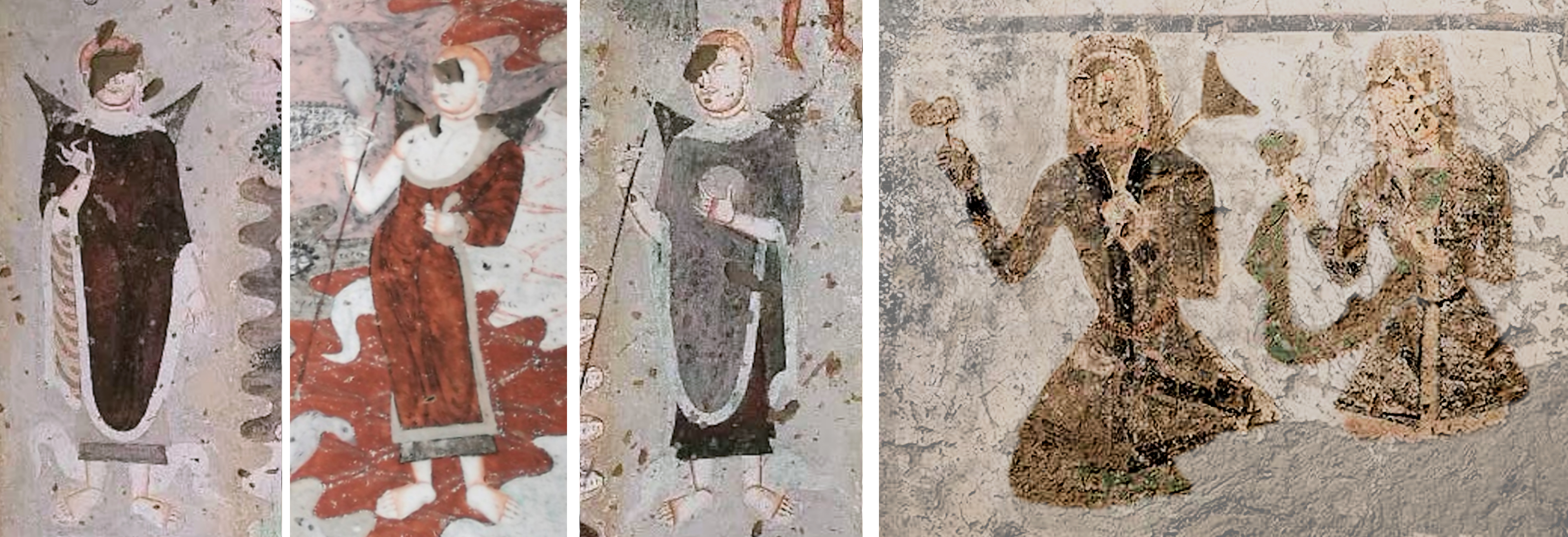
Kuchean monks and lay devotees circa 300 CE, in the paintings of the Cave of the Hippocampi (Cave 118), Kizil Caves.

During the Later Han (25–220 CE), Kucha and the rest of the Tarim Basin became a focus of rivalry between the Xiongnu to the north and the Han Chinese to the east. In 74 CE, Chinese troops started to take control of the Tarim Basin with the conquest of Turfan. In the first century CE, Kucha resisted the Chinese and allied itself with the Xiongnu and the Yuezhi against the Chinese general Ban Chao. Even the Kushan Empire of Kujula Kadphises sent an army to the Tarim Basin to support Kucha, but retreated after minor encounters.

In 124, Kucha formally submitted to the Chinese court, and by 127 China had conquered the whole of the Tarim Basin. Kucha became a part of the Western protectorate of the Chinese Han dynasty, with China's control of the Silk Road facilitating the exchange of art and the propagation of Buddhism from Central Asia. The Roman Maes Titianus visited the area in the 2nd century CE, as did numerous great Buddhist missionaries such as the Parthian An Shigao, the Yuezhis Lokaksema and Zhi Qian, or the Indian Zhú Shuòfú (竺朔佛). Around 150 CE, Chinese power in the western territories receded, and the Tarim Basin and its city-states regained independence.

=== 4th- and 5th-century Silk Road ===
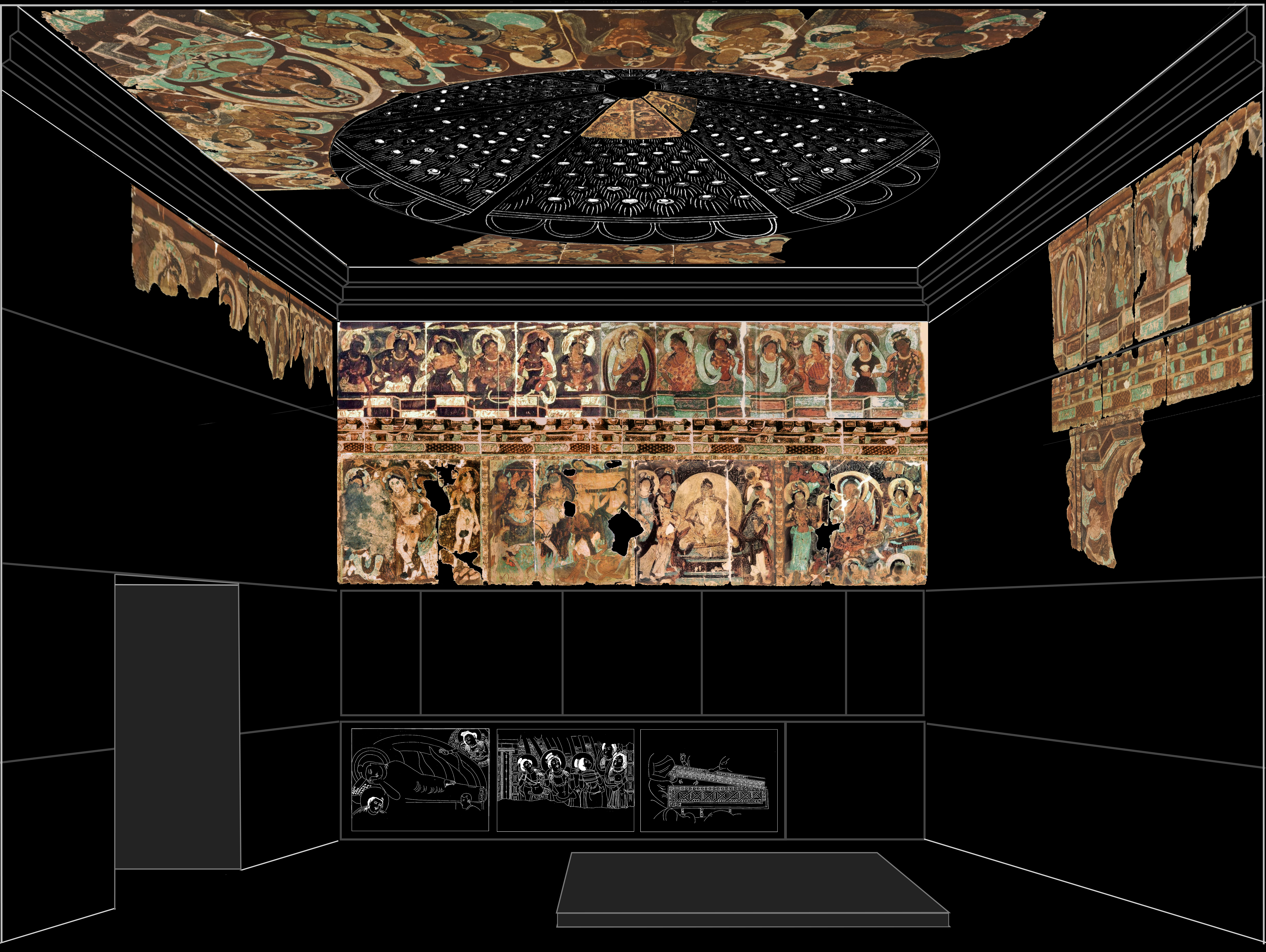
The "Peacock Cave", in the Kizil Caves near Kucha, built circa 400 CE.

Kucha became very powerful and rich in the last quarter of the 4th century CE, about to take over most of the trade along the Silk Road at the expense of the Southern Silk Road, which lay along the southern edge of the Tarim Basin. According to the Jinshu, Kucha was highly fortified, had a splendid royal palace, as well as many Buddhist stupas and temples:

There are fortified cities everywhere, their ramparts are three-fold, inside there are thousands of Buddhist stupas and temples (...) The royal palace is magnificent, glowing like a heavenly abode".

— Jinshu, Book 97.

Culture flourished, and Indian Sanskrit scriptures were being translated by the Kuchean monk and translator Kumarajiva (344–413 CE), himself the son of a man from Kashmir and a Kuchean mother. The southern kingdoms of Shanshan and the Jushi Kingdom (now Turfan and Jiaohe) asked for Chinese assistance in countering Kucha and its neighbour Karashar. The Chinese general Lü Guang was sent with a military force by Emperor Fu Jian (357–385) of the Former Qin (351–394). Lü Guang obtained the surrender of Karashar and conquered Kucha in 383 CE. Lü Guang mentioned the powerful armour of Kucha soldiers, a type of Sasanian chainmail and lamellar armour that can also be seen in the paintings of the Kizil Caves as noted in the Biography of Chinese General Lü Guang: "They were skillful with arrows and horses, and good with short and long spears. Their armour was like chain link; even if one shoots it, [the arrow] cannot go in."

Lü Guang soon retired and the empire of Fu Jian crumbled against the Eastern Jin, and he established a principality in Gansu, bringing Kumarajiva together with him.

=== 6th century ===
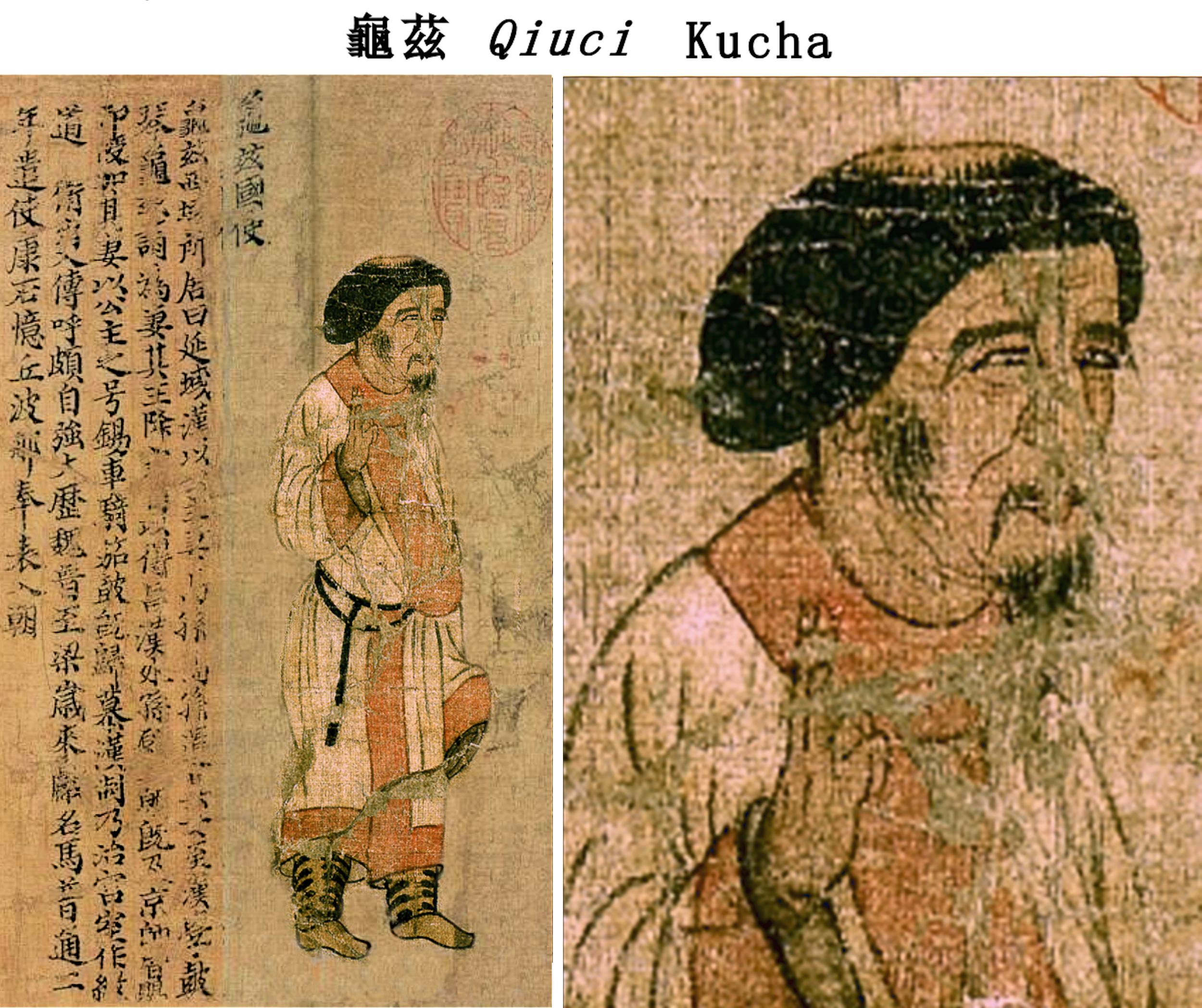
Kucha ambassador at the Chinese court of Emperor Yuan of Liang in his capital Jingzhou in 516–520 CE, with explanatory text. Portraits of Periodical Offering of Liang, 11th-century Song copy.

Kucha ambassadors are known to have visited the Chinese court of Emperor Yuan of Liang in his capital Jingzhou in 516–520 CE, at or around the same time as the Hepthalite embassies there. An ambassador from Kucha is illustrated in Portraits of Periodical Offering of Liang, painted in 526–539 CE, an 11th-century Song copy of which has survived.

The Chinese pilgrim Xuanzang visited Kucha and in the 630s described Kucha at some length, and the following are excerpts from his descriptions of Kucha:

The soil is suitable for rice and grain... it produces grapes, pomegranates and numerous species of plums, pears, peaches, and almonds... The ground is rich in minerals-gold, copper, iron, and lead and tin. The air is soft, and the manners of the people honest. The style of writing is Indian, with some differences. They excel other countries in their skill in playing on the lute and pipe. They clothe themselves with ornamental garments of silk and embroidery... There are about one hundred convents in this country, with five thousand and more disciples. These belong to the Little Vehicle of the school of the Sarvastivadas. Their doctrine and their rules of discipline are like those of India, and those who read them use the same originals... About 40 li to the north of this desert city there are two convents close together on the slope of a mountain... Outside the western gate of the chief city, on the right and left side of the road, there are erect figures of Buddha, about 90 feet high.

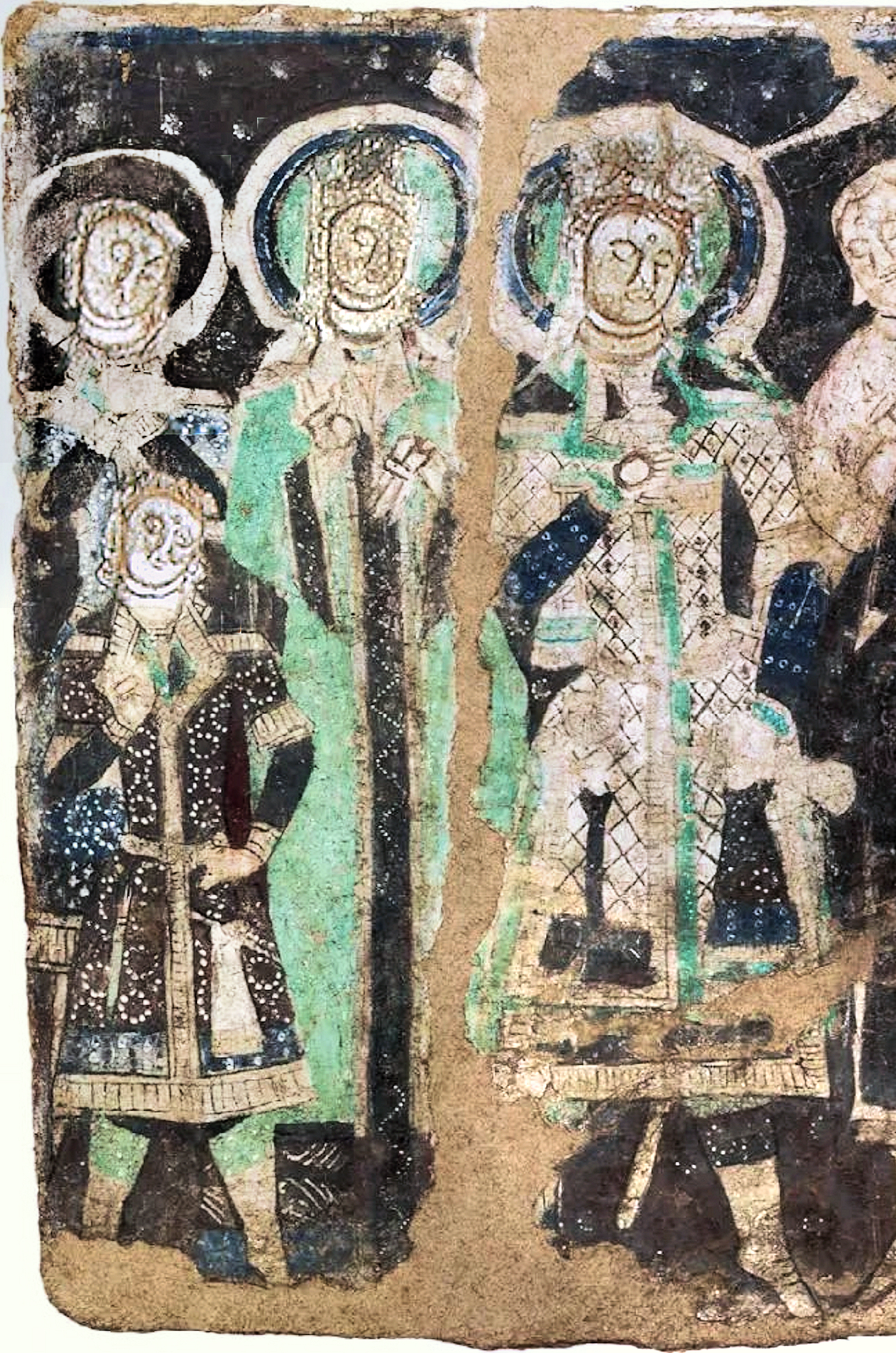
Royal family of the oasis city-state of Kucha (King, Queen and young Princes), Cave 17, Kizil Caves. Circa 500 CE, Hermitage Museum.

A specific style of music developed within the region and "Kuchean" music gained popularity as it spread along the trade lines of the Silk Road. Lively scenes of Kuchean music and dancing can be found in the Kizil Caves and are described in the writings of Xuanzang. "[T]he fair ladies and benefactresses of Kizil and Kumtura in their tight-waisted bodices and voluminous skirts recall—notwithstanding the Buddhic theme—that at all the halting places along the Silk Road, in all the rich caravan towns of the Tarim, Kucha was renowned as a city of pleasures, and that as far as China men talked of its musicians, its dancing girls, and its courtesans." Kuchean music was very popular in Tang China, particularly the lute, which became known in Chinese as the pipa. For example, within the collection of the Guimet Museum, two Tang female musician figures represent the two prevailing traditions: one plays a Kuchean pipa and the other plays a Chinese jiegu (an Indian-style drum). The music of Kucha, along with other early medieval music, was transmitted from China to Japan during the same period and is preserved there, somewhat transformed, as gagaku or Japanese court music.

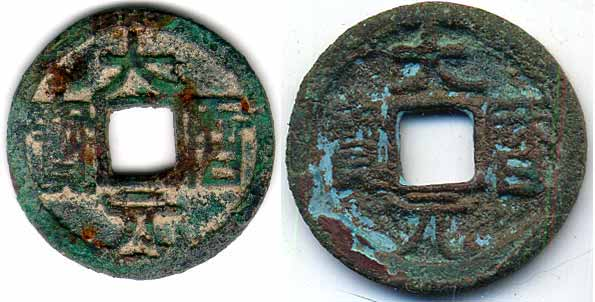
Dali coins founded in Kucha

=== 7th to 13th centuries ===
Following its conquest by the Tang dynasty in the early 7th century, during Emperor Taizong's campaign against the Western Regions, the city of Kucha was regarded by Han Chinese as one of the Four Garrisons of Anxi: the "Pacified West", or even its capital.

During a few decades of domination by the Tibetan Empire, in the late 7th century, Kucha was usually at least semi-independent.

In the 8th and 9th centuries, Uyghurs increasingly migrated into the area. After the destruction of the Uyghur Khaganate by Kyrgyz forces in 840, Kucha became an important center of the Uyghur kingdom of Qocho.

The extensive ruins of the ancient capital and the Subashi Temple (Chinese Qiuci), which was abandoned in the 13th century, lie 20 kilometres (12 mi) north of modern Kucha.

=== Modern Kucha ===
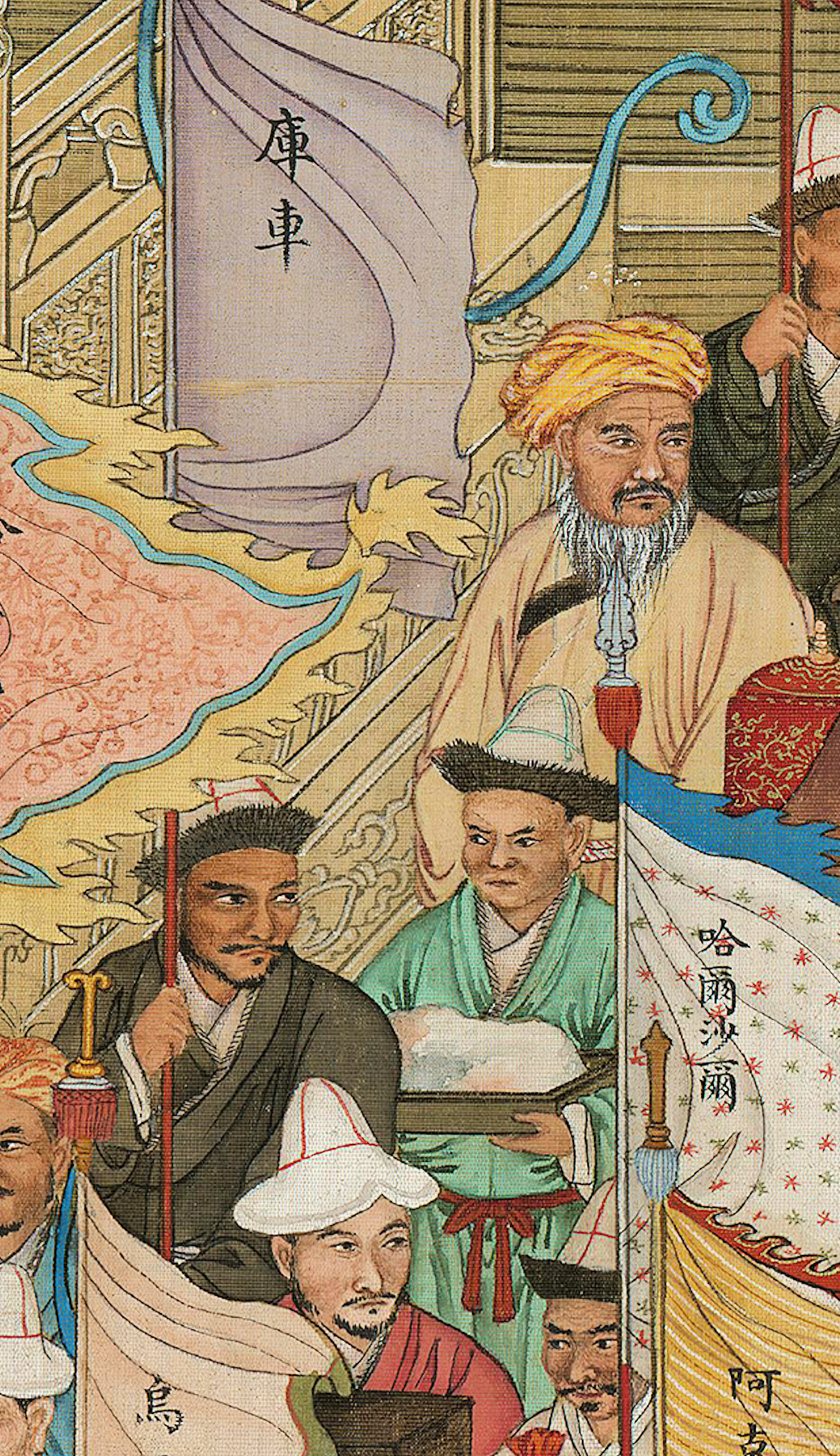
Kucha (庫車) delegates in 1761 in Beijing, China. 万国来朝图

Francis Younghusband, who passed through the oasis in 1887 on his journey from Beijing to India, described the district as "probably" having some 60,000 inhabitants. The modern Chinese town was about 700 square yards (590 m^{2}) with a 25 feet (7.6 m) high wall, with no bastions or protection to the gateways, but a ditch about 20 feet (6.1 m) deep around it. It was filled with houses and "a few bad shops". The "Turk houses" ran right up to the edge of the ditch and there were remains of an old city to the south-east of the Chinese one, but most of the shops and houses were outside of it. About 800 yards (730 m) north of the Chinese city were barracks for 500 soldiers out of a garrison he estimated to total about 1500 men, who were armed with old Enfield rifles "with the Tower mark".

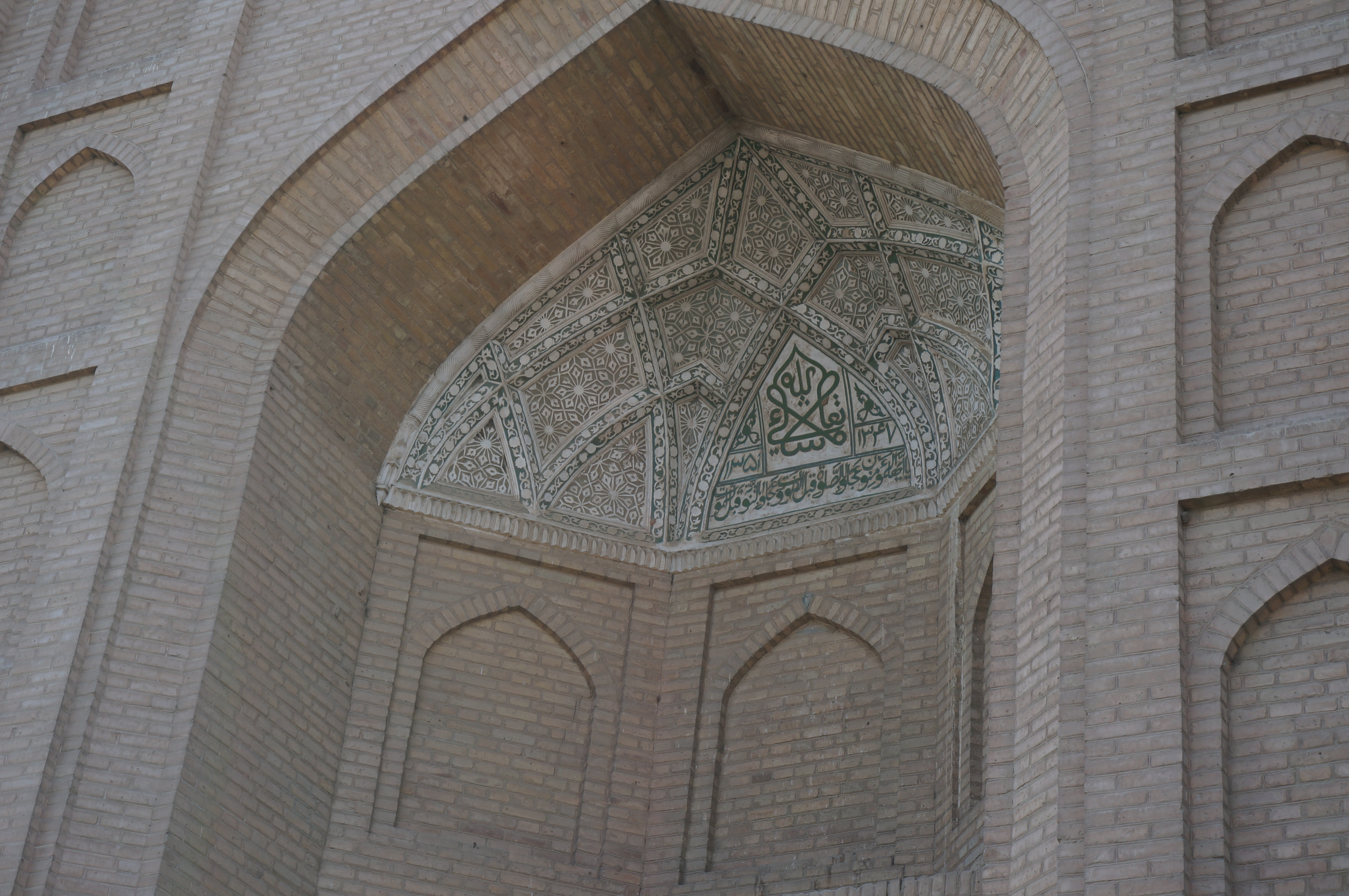
Detail of the Facade of the Kucha mosque

Kucha is now part of Kuqa, Xinjiang. It is divided into the new city, which includes the People's Square and transportation center, and the old city, where the Friday market and vestiges of the past city wall and cemetery are located. Along with agriculture, the city also manufactures cement, carpets, and other household necessities in its local factories.

==== Modern Scholarship on Kucha ====
Modern efforts to investigate the Kucha region's history have contributed to knowledge of China's rich cultural history. The Chinese government has taken steps towards studying the history of ancient cities such as Kucha to understand what role the city played during different areas, such as the time the Silk Road was active. Since it is understood that Kucha was an active oasis town along the Silk Road and that the town had political and cultural influence, the town is a place of frequent scholarship. Kucha was declared a UNESCO world heritage site in 2014, and with this declaration came increased protection of the area as well as funding towards historical investigations. The cave complexes in Kucha are a tourist destination, and thus interest in Buddhist influence and history of the region are subjects in modern scholarship.

The Kucha Research Academy was founded in 1985 and has led efforts to research, preserve, and educate on the Kucha region. Kucha is subject of investigations by various countries such as China, Japan, and Germany, among others who have led modern investigations into the region. Historical artifacts from the Kucha region are located at Kucha itself, but other objects, such as cave paintings, have since been removed and are located at museums in other countries. Artifacts, whether located in Kucha or elsewhere, have educated visitors on Kucha's place in China's history.

== Archaeological investigations of the region ==
There are several significant archaeological sites in the region which were investigated by the third (1905–1907, led by Albert Grünwedel) and fourth (1913–1914, led by Albert von Le Coq) German Turfan expeditions. Those in the immediate vicinity include the cave site of Achik-Ilek and Subashi. The archaeological investigations of the Kizil Caves provide documented evidence of what the caves looked like before they degraded over time. The Kizil Caves in the Kucha region contained Buddhist artwork and artifacts, some of which were excavated by explorers or kept in the caves. Over 30 caves have been discovered around the Kucha region which serve as tourist attractions today, but have been altered over time due to human activity and natural disasters.

The cave paintings extracted from the Kizil Caves were removed from walls and ceilings during previous expeditions. The caves which were discovered during these expeditions were filled with artwork which reflected religious motifs. In his archaeological excavation of the caves, Le Coq recorded his methods of wall art extraction in detail: a sharp knife was used to cut through the painting and into the cave wall as to allow for its removal to subsequently be placed in crates and shipped back to Europe. As the paintings were removed in pieces and shipped over long distances, the fragments were very fragile and required careful handling in order to be prepared for display.

There have been several archaeological investigations of the Kucha region since the German Turfan expedition in the early 20th century. Despite the Kizil Caves in Kucha being a tourist attraction, there have been steps towards the site's preservation and protection. Since UNESCO identified the Kizil Caves as a national heritage site in 2014, the Chinese government increased its efforts in protecting the region.

== Kucha and Buddhism ==
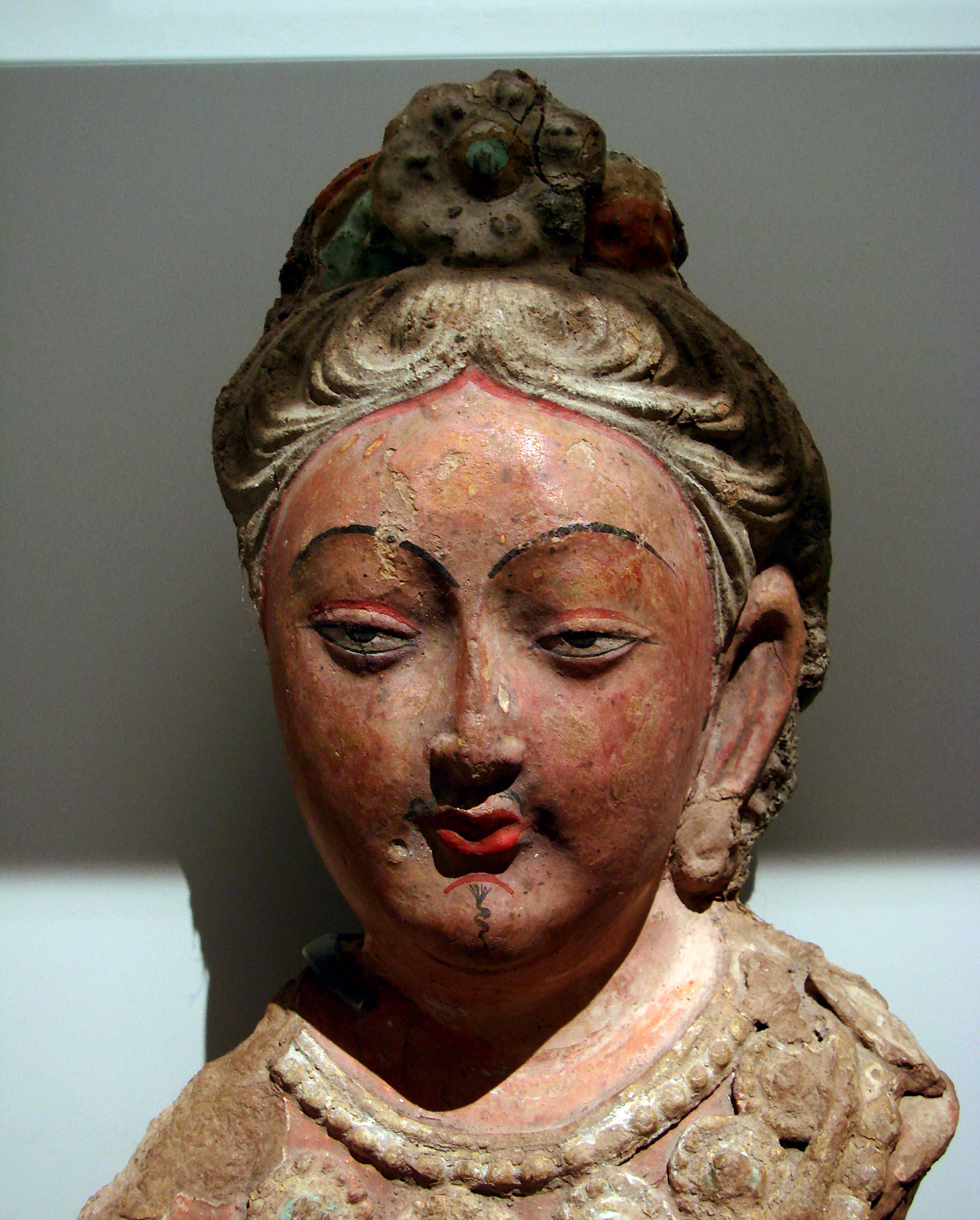
Bust of a bodhisattva from Kucha, 6th–7th century. Guimet Museum.

Kucha was an important Buddhist center from Antiquity until the late Middle Ages. Buddhism was introduced to Kucha before the end of the 1st century, however it was not until the 4th century that the kingdom became a major center of Buddhism, primarily the Sarvastivada, but eventually also Mahayana Buddhism during the Uighur period. In this respect it differed from Khotan, a Mahayana-dominated kingdom on the southern side of the desert. Kucha served as an important intermediary in the transmission of Buddhism from the Indian subcontinent to China. Buddhist traditions reached the oasis kingdom through Kashmir and Gandhara, where they developed into a flourishing monastic culture before spreading eastward. The kingdom became one of the principal centres for Buddhist learning, translation and artistic exchange along the northern Silk Road.Kucha was an important Buddhist centre on the northern Silk Road. It developed as a place of Buddhist learning, where monasteries, scholars and translators helped spread teachings and texts. Its location connected India and Central Asia, making Kucha an important centre for Buddhist scholarship and cultural exchange. According to the Book of Jin, during the third century there were nearly one thousand Buddhist stupas and temples in Kucha. At this time, Kuchanese monks began to travel to China. The fourth century saw yet further growth for Buddhism within the kingdom. The palace was said to resemble a Buddhist monastery, displaying carved stone Buddhas, and monasteries around the city were numerous.

Buddhism was the prominent faith in Kucha, and continued to be for centuries. After the Islamic conquest Buddhist structures, artwork, and other evidence of Buddhist worship had begun to vanish, being replaced with Islamic structures. The Kizil Caves, located in the Kucha region, have been excavated and the archaeological missions to the cave sites have subsequently revealed the city was once a Buddhist place of worship.

The structures known as the Kizil Caves and their subsequent artworks connect the ancient city of Kucha to surrounding areas with the historical spread of Buddhism. The practice of Buddhist faith in the city led to the creation of several Buddhist artworks and structures, which have been the subject of archaeological investigations since the early 20th century. The Kizil Caves were even labeled a world heritage site in 2014 by UNESCO, suggesting their importance in Chinese cultural history. These caves were influenced by Kucha's connection to the Sanskrit Buddhist practice and reflect this connection via its Buddhist artwork.

=== Monks ===
Monks in ancient Kucha were connected with other countries via language. Buddhist Monks from Kucha had communicated in Sanskrit, and thus had a connection to India through this language.

==== Po-Yen ====
From 256 to 260, a monk named Po-Yen or Boyan who was from the royal family traveled to the Chinese capital, Luoyang. In 258, he translated six Buddhist texts into Chinese at China's famous White Horse Temple, including the Longer Sukhāvatīvyūha Sūtra, an important sutra in Pure Land Buddhism.

==== Po-Śrīmitra ====
Po-Śrīmitra was another Kuchean monk who traveled to China (307 to 312) and translated three Buddhist texts.

==== Po-Yen ====
A second Kuchean Buddhist monk also known as Po-Yen or Boyan also went to Liangzhou (modern Wuwei, Gansu, China) and is said to have been well respected, although he is not known to have translated any texts.

==== Kumarajiva ====
Kumarajiva (344–413) is one of the most well-known monks from Kucha. His contributions to Buddhist scholarship largely come from his work as a translator of Kuchean Buddhist texts into Chinese. Kumarajiva was not the first nor the only person to have translated ancient texts, but his translations were significant because his work made hundreds of Buddhist texts available to Chinese readers. The Silk Road was in use during Kumarajiva's lifetime he utilized this path for the flow of ideas and religion into other regions, especially China. Kumarajiva learned from traveling Buddhist scholars and educators of other religions from an early age, setting the foundation for his later scholarship. Kucha was an oasis town where many immigrants and travelers passed through while traveling along the Silk Road, and since the town was a Buddhist center it left imprints of its culture on those who visited. Kumarajiva was 20 years old when he officially became a monk, adding to his credibility as a Buddhist teacher and scholar. Kucha was a town where many cultures and religions coexisted amongst each other, and this being where Kumarajiva grew up, influenced him as he traveled across the Silk Road.

Kumarajiva learned Buddhism and taught it to those he could translate and communicate with, which shifted from Hinayana to Mahayana Buddhism in his lifetime. His position in Kuchean history aided Buddhist practices and beliefs reach to different areas of China, even different variants of Buddhism. Kumarajiva was a profound educator of Mahayana Buddhism, and it was this practice which he would preach to those he encountered whilst traveling or translating. Practices and beliefs of Mahayana Buddhism in Kucha are evident in records of Kumarajiva's teachings as well as the Kizil Cave complexes in the area.

== Tocharian languages ==
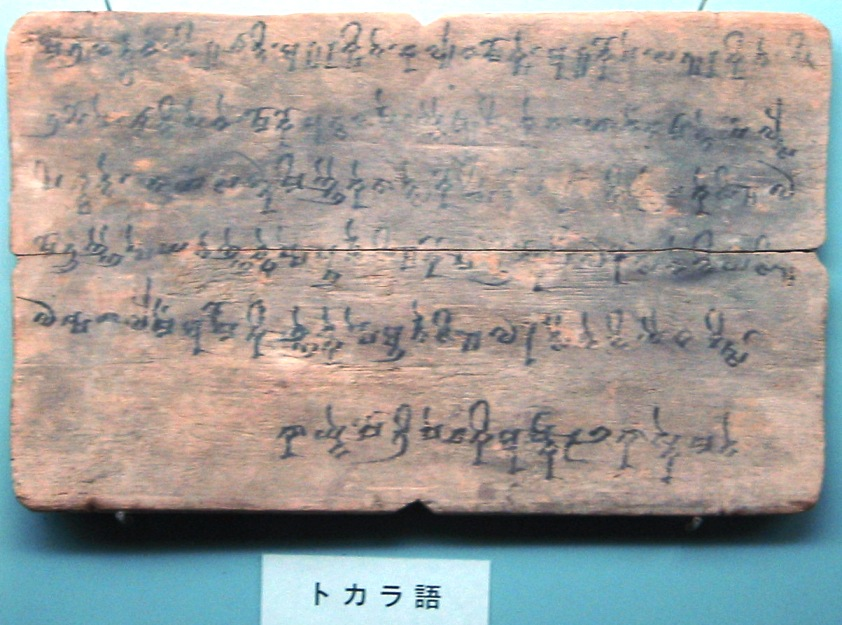
Wooden plate with inscription in a Tocharian language. Kucha, 5th–8th century. Tokyo National Museum.

The language of Kucha, as evidenced by surviving manuscripts and inscriptions, was Kuśiññe (Kushine) also known as Tocharian B or West Tocharian, an Indo-European language. Later, under the Uighur domination, the Kingdom of Kucha gradually became Turkic-speaking. Kuśiññe was completely forgotten until the early 20th century, when inscriptions and documents in two related (but mutually unintelligible) languages were discovered at various sites in the Tarim Basin. Conversely, Tocharian A, or Ārśi was native to the region of Turpan (known later as Turfan) and Agni (Qarašähär; Karashar), although the Kuśiññe language also seems to have been spoken there.

While written in a Central Asian Brahmi script used typically for Indo-Iranian languages, the Tocharian languages (as they became known by modern scholars) belong to the centum group of Indo-European languages, which are otherwise native to Southern and Western Europe. The precise dating of known Tocharian texts is contested, but they were written around the 6th to 8th centuries CE (although Tocharian speakers must have arrived in the region much earlier). Both languages became extinct before circa 1000 CE. Scholars are still trying to piece together a fuller picture of these languages, their origins, history and connections, etc.

== Neighbors ==
The kingdom bordered Aksu and Kashgar to the west and Karasahr and Turpan to the east. Across the Taklamakan Desert to the south was Khotan.

== Culture, sights and cityscape ==
=== Cityscape ===
Today the city is divided into an old town (gucheng) on the westbank of the river, a new town several kilometers on the west. Between these two towns was located the ancient city of Kucha.

Aurel Stein, in his work Innermost Asia, described Kucha as follows, p. 806, in the beginning of the 20th century:

The present town, situated dose to the western river bank and surrounded for the most part by weak walls of stamped clay, manifestly of modem construction, shows no old remains above ground as far as I could ascertain.But on the opposite side of the river, where lively suburban bāzārs stretching along the main roads towards the town, mingle with orchards, fields, and clusters ot cultivators’ farms, l was able to trace the remains of a larger and certainly much older circumvallation. Their position, almost due south of the Sū-bāchi shrines and somewhat nearer to them than that of the present town, suggests that they may well mark the site of the walls that enclosed the Kuchā city of Tang time

=== Ancient city (Tang dynasty) ===
==== Historical description ====
During his journey to Kucha in 630 CE, the renowned pilgrim Xuanzang provided a detailed description of the ancient city. He wrote:

Its capital city is about seventeen or eighteen li in circuit. […] There are two standing statues of the Buddha, more than ninety feet in height, one at each side of the road outside the west gate of the capital city. It is at this place in front of the statues that the great quinquennial congregations are held. […] At the northwest of the meeting place I crossed a river and reached Āścarya (‘Marvelous’) Monastery.

This description indicates that, at that time, the city was situated to the east of the river.

==== Archaeological discoveries ====
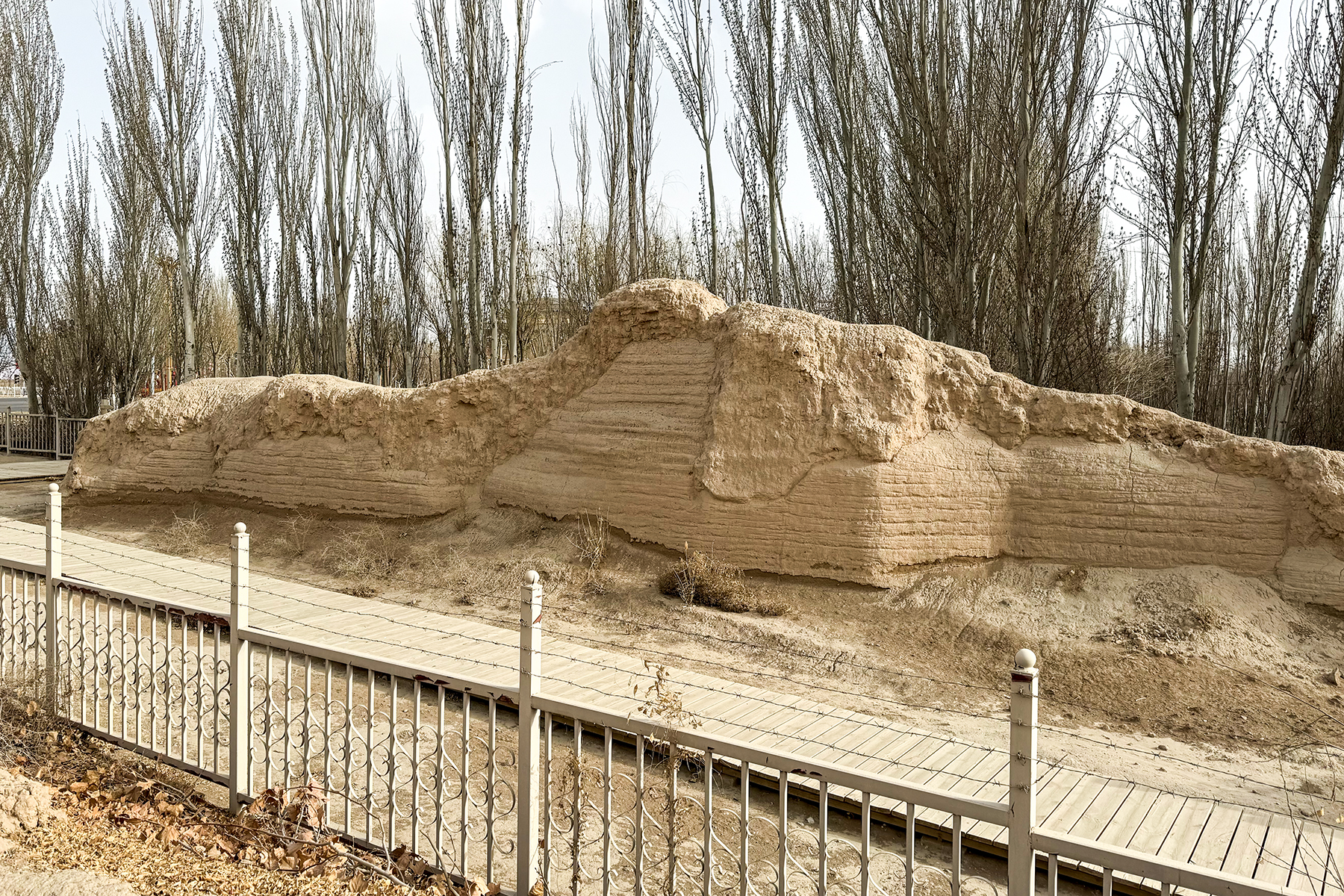
Ancient Wall of Kucha

In modern times, explorers reported the remains of an old city on the left (east) bank of the Kucha River. Aurel Stein, in his work Innermost Asia, traced the eastern wall of this ancient city for approximately 800 meters. He described the structure as a wall constructed of compacted earth blocks, approximately 18 meters thick and still standing 5 to 6 meters high. At regular intervals, the wall was reinforced with quadrangular bastions. Stein noted that the wall's top did not appear to have been crenellated. By the early 20th century, the northern and southern sections had mostly eroded, and the western wall had completely disappeared—likely washed away by the river.

Huang Wenbi provided more precise data during an expedition in 1957–1958. He estimated that the total length of the ancient city's walls was 5.5 kilometers. According to him, the eastern wall was 15 meters thick and 6.6 meters high, reinforced with quadrangular bastions spaced every 40 meters. However, its construction differed from that of the northern and southern walls. The eastern wall was built using large, coarse earthen blocks, while the northern and southern walls were made of compacted earth with a finer, ochre-colored structure. Their thickness varied, and unlike the eastern wall, they lacked quadrangular bastions. Huang Wenbi suggested that the northern and southern walls were older. According to Monique Maillard, this discrepancy might be attributed to different cultural influences: Chinese builders favored straight walls, while local traditions incorporated quadrangular bastions.

Stein identified this ancient city as the one described by the pilgrim Xuanzang, as its dimensions matched the recorded measurements. Huang Wenbi, relying on Chinese historical texts, reached the same conclusion.

Only a few monuments of the ancient city remain, documented by early explorers through photographs. The first, named the "Allal-Bagh Stūpa" by Pelliot, appears to have been a large stūpa with a ramp, similar to the Subashi Stūpa. Pelliot also photographed another stūpa, the "Sādhan Tourâ Stūpa," which seems to belong to the same architectural type.

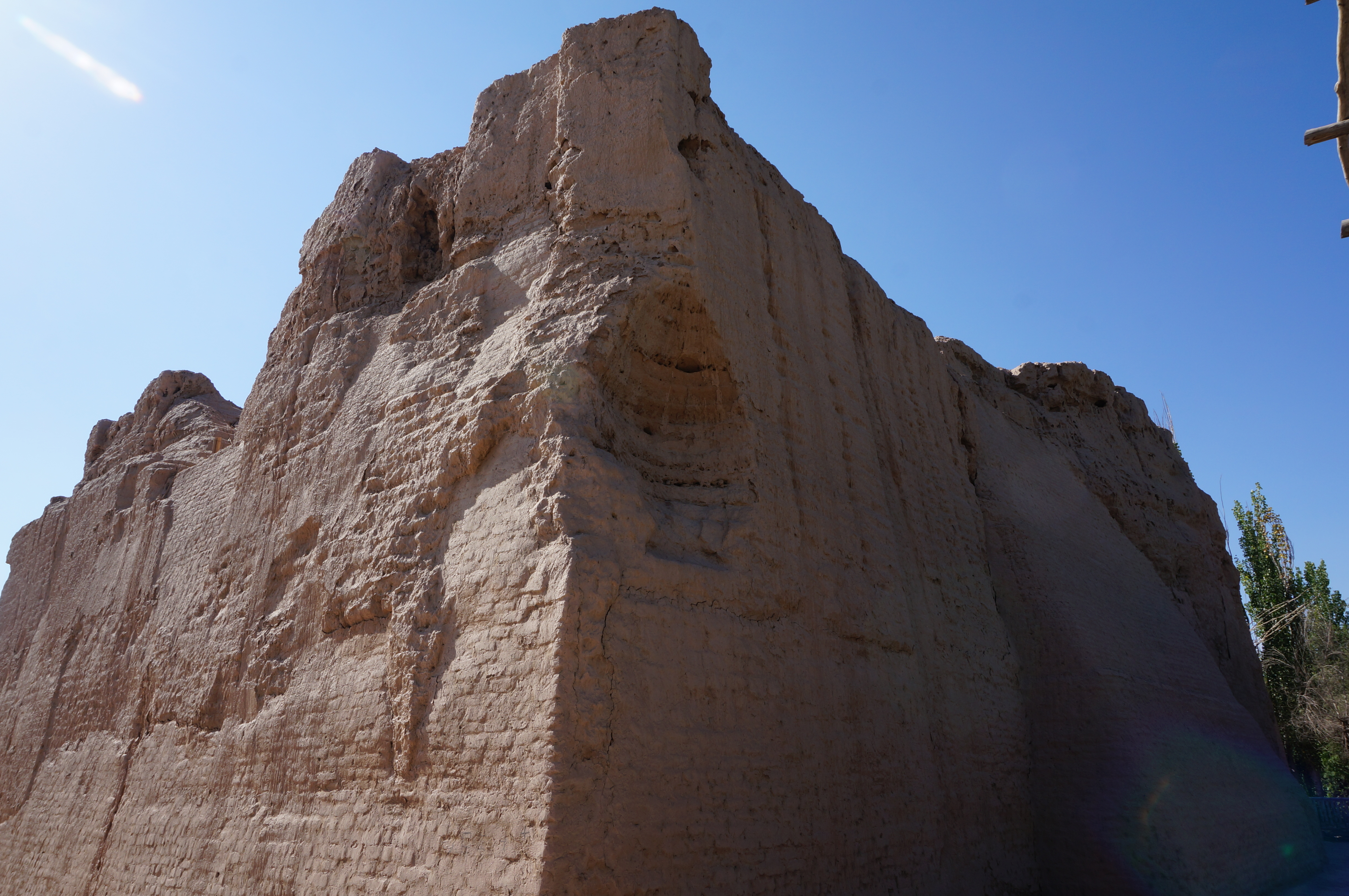
Pilang Tura (Pílàng dūn 皮浪墩) in Pílàng Village 皮浪村 Kucha Township

The most significant structure, referred to as "Pilan Ourda" by Pelliot and "Pilang Tura" by Stein, is a massive construction made of large earthen blocks. It was located in the southeastern corner of the ancient city's enclosure. According to both Huang Wenbi and Stein, it was a large quadrangular building measuring 21 by 25 meters. It was constructed with solid masonry of large rough-hewn blocks resting on a foundation of compacted earth. At the top, a broad platform showed traces of a structure containing two rooms, one of which housed a large platform, possibly intended for a statue.

The exact function of this building remains uncertain. While Stein did not determine its purpose, Huang Wenbi suggested it was a defensive structure.

==== 2016 excavations ====
In 2016, archaeologists uncovered a well‑constructed brick‑paved pathway made of blue bricks arranged in patterns with circular floral motifs at junctions. Parts of the city wall and a U‑shaped moat—measuring approximately 7.5 meters wide and 3.1 meters deep—were also revealed. Approximately 80 artifacts, including pottery, stone tools, building materials, and coins, were recovered.

==== 2017 excavations ====
Further excavations in 2017 at the Qiongtayin site (Chinese: 穷特音墩, 穷特音墩) within the city uncovered residential structures, a courtyard, multiple ash pits, hearths, and post holes, along with a high‑platform building. Ten late‑period tombs were also unearthed, with some structures disrupted by burial activities. Artifacts such as pottery fragments, copper and iron implements, coins (including both clipped‑edge “Wu Zhu” coins and local Kucha coins), and animal bones were found. The predominantly wheel‑made redware pottery featured decorative motifs like cloud patterns, lotus petals, foliage, and drapery designs, suggesting a primary occupation during the Tang Dynasty.

=== Sights and architectural heritage ===
==== Kucha Great Mosque ====
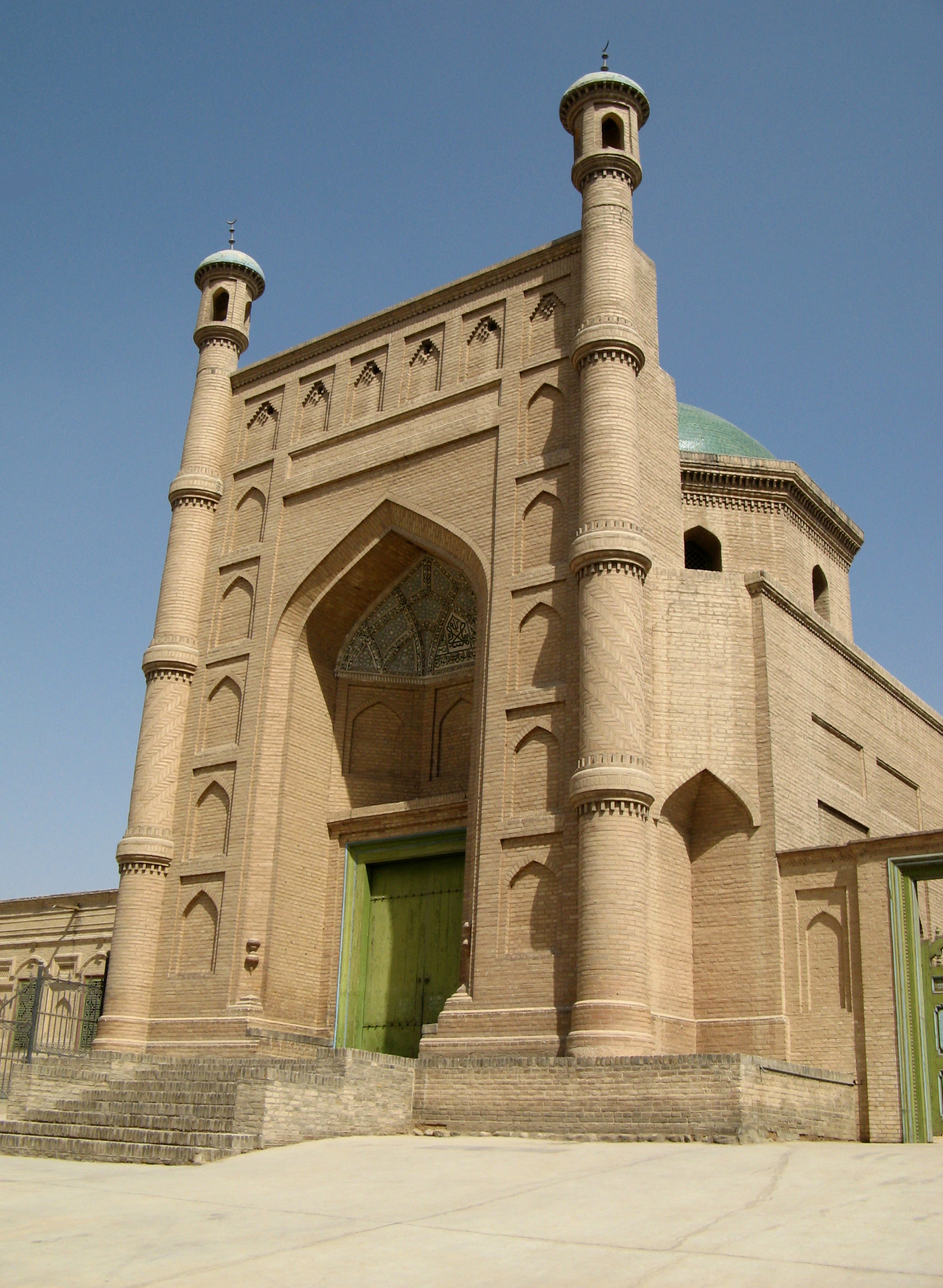
Side view of the prayer hall and minaret, showing the dome and arched windows

The Kucha Great Mosque (库车大寺) is located on a raised platform called Kegedun, to the northwest of the old city of Kucha. As of 2020, it is the second largest mosque in Xinjiang after the Aitigaer Mosque in Kashgar, and it contains the only well-preserved site of an Islamic court in Xinjiang that once operated under Islamic law. In the 16th century, Isḥāq Wālī, the founder of the Heishan Sect, preached in the region from Kashgar to Kucha. According to tradition, he established the mosque in 1561 (some sources suggest 1559). During the reign of the Kangxi Emperor in 1668, the mosque was expanded. Over the following centuries, it underwent several renovations. In the 14th year of the Republic of China (1925, though some sources say 1929), a fire damaged part of the mosque's wooden main hall. Later that year, local imam 艾里木阿吉 financed its reconstruction. The mosque was rebuilt in the fall and completed in 1932, reaching its current scale.

==== Kucha Royal Palace (库车王府) ====
Built in 1759 during the Qing Dynasty, the Kucha Royal Palace was established by Emperor Qianlong to honor local leaders for their loyalty. The palace showcases a blend of Central Plains and Islamic architectural styles. Although the original structure was destroyed in the early 20th century, it was reconstructed in 2004 based on historical records. Today, the palace complex includes the Palace Cultural Relics Museum, Qiuci Museum, Kucha Folk Exhibition Hall, and the Qing Dynasty City Wall, offering insights into the 190-year history of the twelve generations of Kucha princes.

=== Museums ===
==== Wèi and Jìn Tomb Museum ====
The Wèi and Jìn Tomb Museum (魏晋古墓遗址博物馆, Wèi Jìn gǔmù yízhǐ bówùguǎn) is built on the site of the nationally protected 库车友谊路墓群 (Kùchē Yǒuyì Lù Mùqún, "Kucha Youyi Road Tomb Group"). Its display area, located 7 to 9 meters underground, exhibits 15 brick tombs that have been fully excavated, preserving the original layout of tomb doors, corridors, burial chambers, and antechambers. This tomb group was first discovered in 2007 during construction work on Youyi Road in Kucha. Following multiple excavations, nearly 2,000 tombs have been cleared and over 2,000 artifacts have been unearthed.Major finds include ceramics, bone implements, coins (such as the "撒五铢钱" [wǔ zhū qián, "five-zhū coins"]), and various metal objects, all of which are consistent with the style of Central Plains Han brick tombs. Some tombs also feature characteristics of Central Plains funerary customs, such as the practice of placing coins in the mouth or hand of the deceased. Archaeologists generally date these tombs to the Jin Sixteen Kingdoms Period (晋十六国时期, Jìn Shíliùguó shíqī), roughly spanning the 3rd to 5th century AD.

=== Kizil Caves ===
The Kizil Caves lie about 70 kilometres (43 mi) northwest of Kucha and were included within the rich fourth-century kingdom of Kucha. The caves claim origins from the royal family of ancient Kucha, specifically a local legend involving Princess Zaoerhan, the daughter of the King of Kucha. While out hunting, the princess met and fell in love with a local mason. When the mason approached the king to ask for permission to marry the princess, the king was appalled and vehemently against the union. He told the young man he would not grant permission unless the mason carved 1000 caves into the local hills. Determined, the mason went to the hills and began carving in order to prove himself to the king. After three years and carving 999 caves, he died from the exhaustion of the work. The distraught princess found his body, and grieved herself to death, and now, her tears are said to be current waterfalls that cascade down some of the cave's rock faces.

== Coinage ==
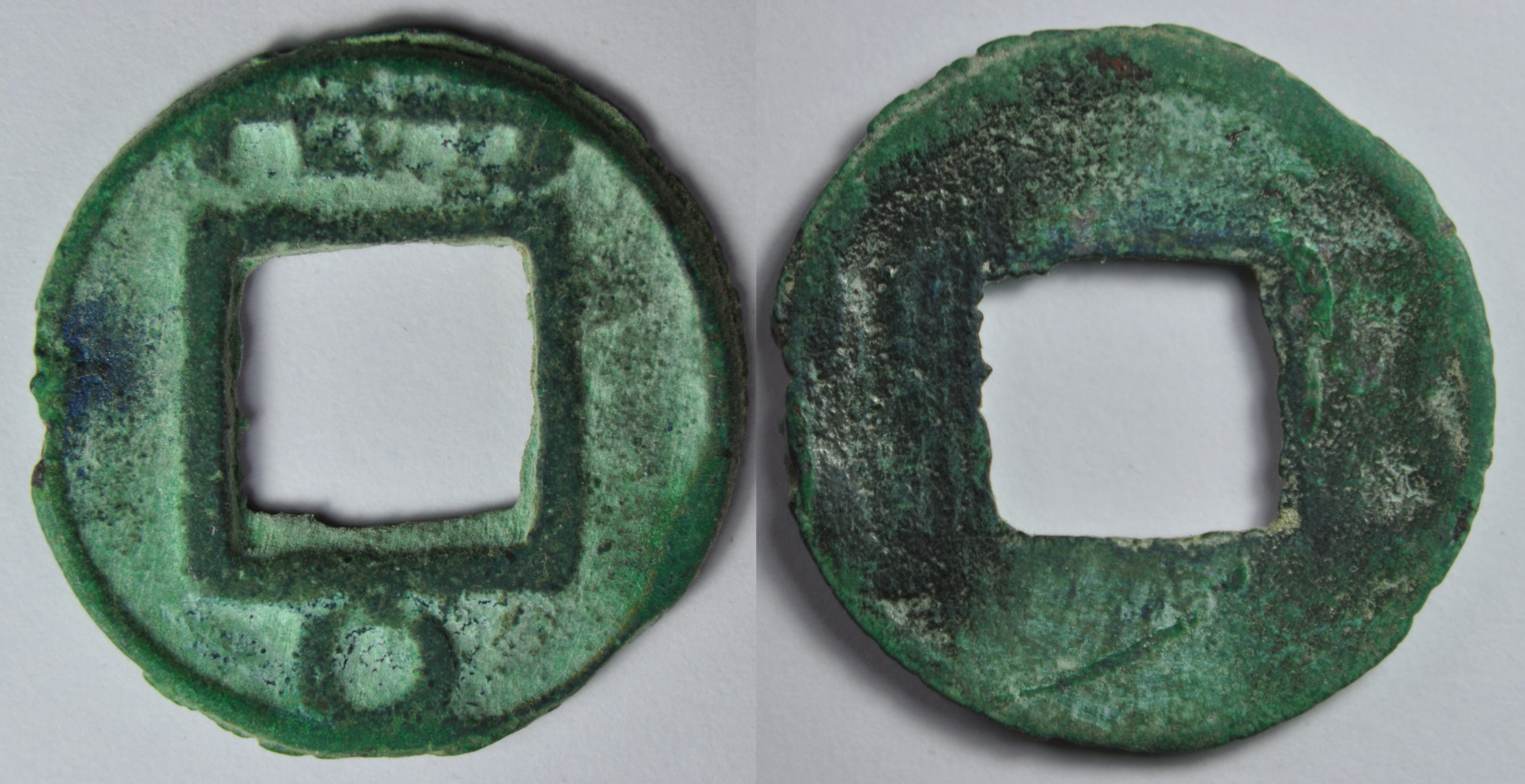
A "Han Qiu bilingual Wu Zhu coin" (漢龜二體五銖錢) produced by the Kingdom of Kucha with both a Chinese and what is presumed to be a Kuśiññe inscription.

From around the third or fourth century Kucha began the manufacture of Wu Zhu (五銖) cash coins inspired by the diminutive and devalued Wu Zhu's of the post-Han dynasty era in Chinese history. It is very likely that the cash coins produced in Kucha predate the Kaiyuan Tongbao (開元通寳) and that the native production of coins stopped sometime after the year 621 when the Wu Zhu cash coins were discontinued in China proper. The coinage of Kucha includes the "Han Qiu bilingual Wu Zhu coin" (漢龜二體五銖錢, hàn qiū èr tǐ wǔ zhū qián) which has a yet undeciphered text belonging to a language spoken in Kucha.

== Rulers ==
(Names are in modern Mandarin pronunciations based on ancient Chinese records)

- Hong (弘) 16
- Cheng De (丞德) 36
- Ze Luo (則羅) 46
- Shen Du (身毒) 50
- Jiang Bin (絳賓) 72
- Jian (建) 73
- You Liduo (尤利多) 76
- Bai Ba (白霸) 91
- Bai Ying (白英) 110–127

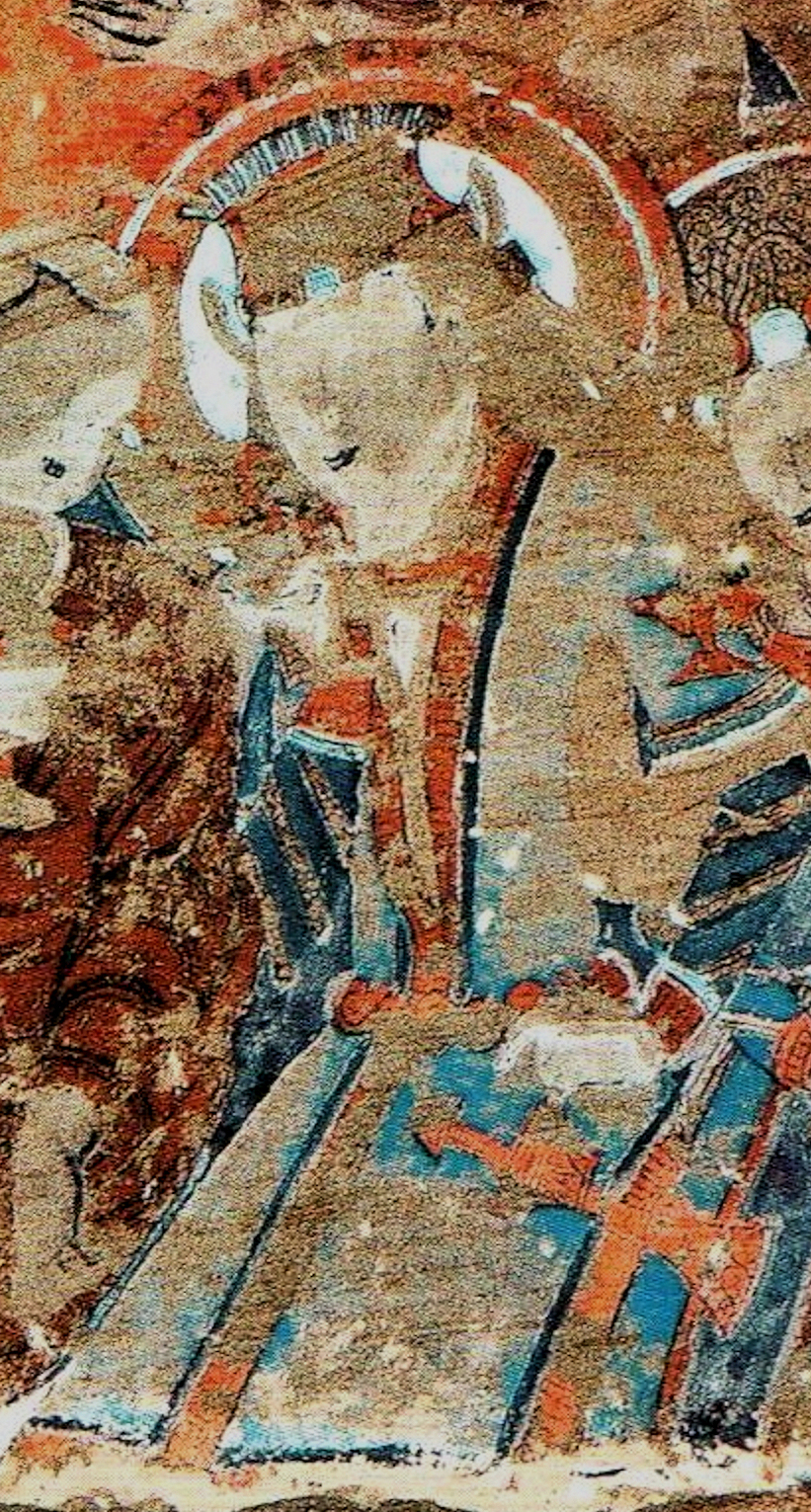
King Suvarnapushpa of Kucha, from Cave 69, Kizil Caves.

- Bai Shan (白山) 280
- Long Hui (龍會) 326
- Bai Chun (白純) 349
- Bai Zhen (白震) 382
- Niruimo Zhunashen (尼瑞摩珠那勝) 521
- Bai Sunidie (白蘇尼咥) 562
- Anandavarman ?
- Tottika (circa 550–600)
- Suvarnapushpa (白蘇伐勃駃 Bái Sūfábókuài) 600–625
- Suvarnadeva (白蘇伐疊 Bai Sufadie) 625-645
- Haripuspa (白訶黎布失畢, Bai Helibushibi) 647
- Bai Yehu (白葉護) 648
- Bai Helibushibi (白訶黎布失畢) 650
- Bai Suji (白素稽) 659
- Yan Tiandie (延田跌) 678
- Bai Mobi (白莫苾) 708
- Bai Xiaojie (白孝節) 719
- Bai Huan (白環) 731–789? / Tang general – Guo Xin 789

== See also ==
- Ci poetry
- Kushan Empire
- Mirza Muhammad Haidar Dughlat
- Qamar-ud-din Khan Dughlat
- Silk Road numismatics
- Silk Road transmission of Buddhism
- Subashi (lost city)
